= NWE No. 21 =

German metre-gauge 2-6-2T locomotive

NWE No. 21 DR Class 99.600
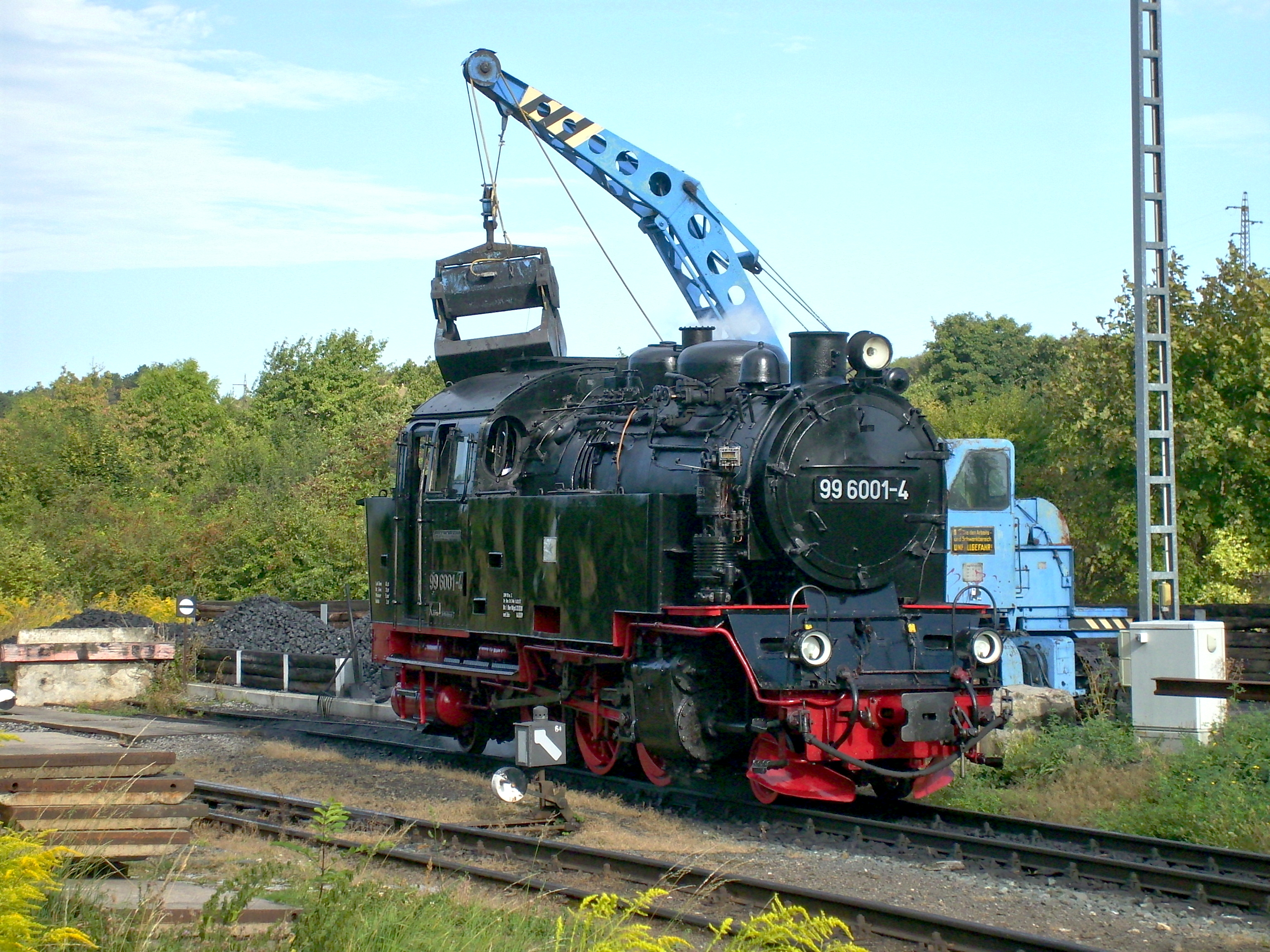
Type and origin
- Builder: Krupp Essen
- Build date: 1939
- Total produced: 1
Specifications
  - German: K 35.10
- Gauge: 1,000 mm (3 ft 3 3/8 in) metre gauge
- Driver dia.: 1,000 mm (3 ft 3 3/8 in)
- Carrying wheel diameter: 600 mm (1 ft 11 5/8 in)
- Minimum curve: 40 m (131.23 ft)
- Wheelbase
  - Overall: 6,060 mm (19 ft 10 1/2 in)
- Length
  - Over beams: 8,875 mm (29 ft 1 3/8 in)
- Width: 2,600 mm (8 ft 6 3/8 in)
- Height: 3,650 mm (11 ft 11 3/4 in)
- Adhesive weight: 30 t (30 long tons; 33 short tons)
- Empty weight: 37.84 t (37.24 long tons; 41.71 short tons)
- Service weight: 47.58 t (46.83 long tons; 52.45 short tons)
- Fuel capacity: 2 t (1.97 long tons; 2.20 short tons)
- Water cap.: 5 m^{3} (1,100 imp gal; 1,300 US gal)
- Boiler
- No. of heating tubes: 108
- No. of smoke tubes: 32
- Boiler pressure: 14 kp/cm^{2} (1.37 MPa; 199 psi)
- Heating surface
  - Firebox: 1.56 m^{2} (16.8 sq ft)
  - Radiative: 7.36 m^{2} (79.2 sq ft)
  - Evaporative: 72.00 m^{2} (775.0 sq ft)
- Superheater
  - Heating area: 25.2 m^{2} (271 sq ft)
- Cylinders: 2
- Cylinder size: 420 mm (16 9/16 in)
- Piston stroke: 500 mm (19 11/16 in)
- Valve gear: Heusinger
- Parking brake: counterweight handbrake
- Couplers: Equalising lever coupler
Performance figures
- Maximum speed: 50 km/h (31 mph)→
- Indicated power: 400 kW (544 PS; 536 hp)
- Tractive effort
  - Starting: 7.4 Mp (73 kN; 7.3 LT_{f}; 8.2 ST_{f}) / 72.5 kN (16,300 lb_{f})
Career
- Numbers: NWE No. 21^{II} DR 99 6001

The NWE No. 21^{II}, later DR 99 6001 is a narrow gauge steam locomotive that was built in 1939 for a track gauge of one metre and is still on duty with the Harz Narrow Gauge Railways (HSB) today.

== History ==
The locomotive was the only unit to be built of a planned series of standard superheated steam locomotives with the axle arrangements 1'C1', 1'D1' and 1'E1', that the Nordhausen-Wernigerode Railway Company (NWE), the Gernrode-Harzgerode Railway Company and the South Harz Railway Company had ordered from Friedrich Krupp AG for replacing their older, less economic saturated steam engines. In standardising their designs, it was envisaged that as many parts of the locomotives as possible would be used across the whole range in the interests of economic production, simplified spare part stock holdings and easier maintenance and servicing. But because the development order was not given by the Deutsche Reichsbahn and because different construction conventions were followed in some cases, these were not seen as Einheitsloks, the standard locomotives produced by the DR between the wars. As a result of the outbreak of World War II, however, only the prototyped of the 1'C1' version was built in 1939 by Krupp; orders for the other engines were cancelled.

The prototype locomotive was accepted into service by the NWE as No. 21 (the second to carry that number) and, following the takeover of the NWE by the East German Deutsche Reichsbahn in 1949, was renumbered to 99 6001. In 1970 the loco was given the computer number 99 6001-4.

In 1956 the engine was transferred, initially temporarily, from the Harz Railway to the Selke Valley Railway. In 1961 this became permanent. After the re-joining of the two lines in 1983/1984 it was once again used for duties on the Harz Railway, for example to head the first scheduled passenger train between Gernrode and Hasselfelde via Stiege on 3 June 1984.

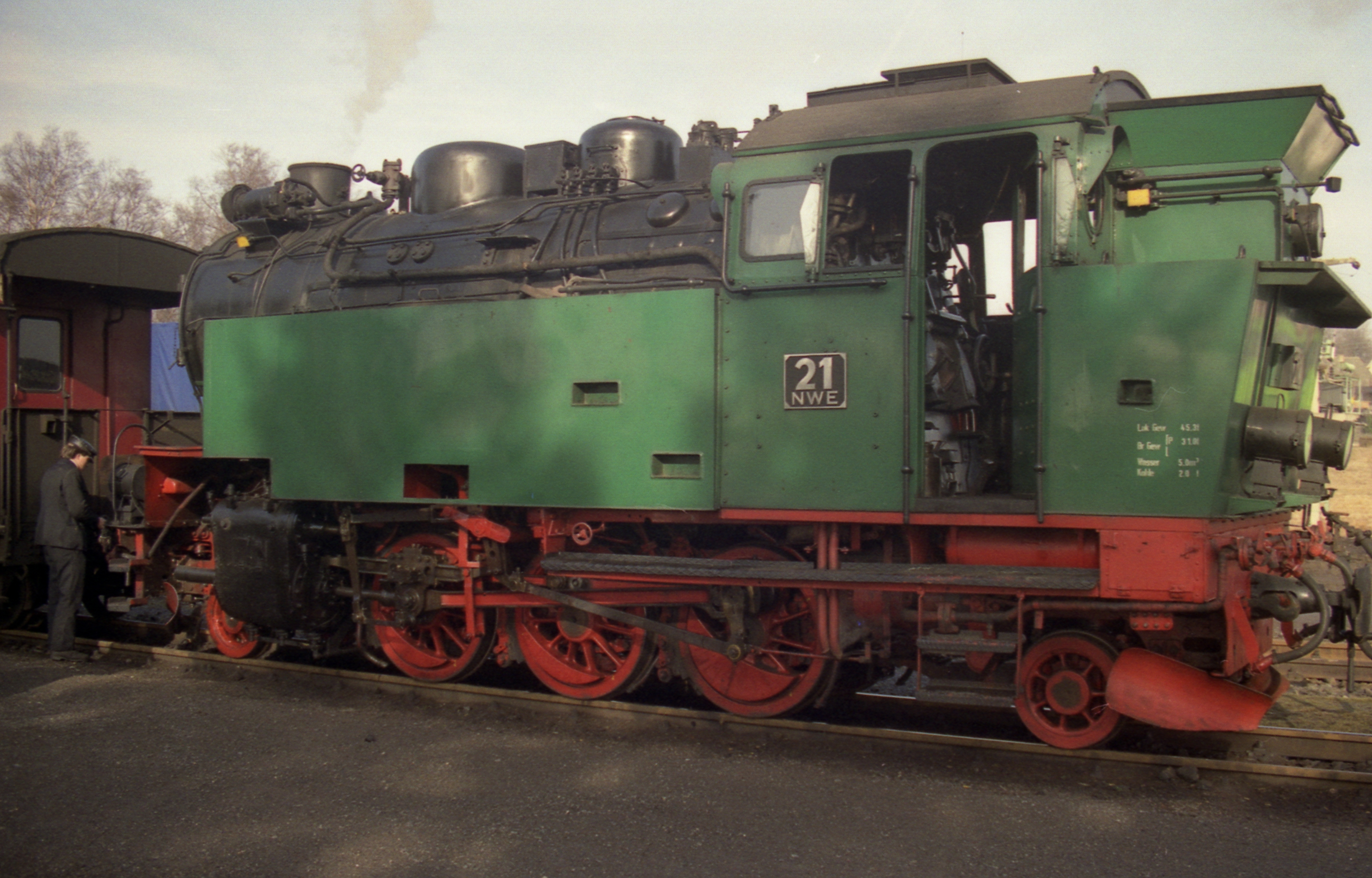
No. 99 6001 in green, nickname Laubfrosch ("tree frog")

Between 1991 and 1994 it did brief service in green livery as no. 21 in charge of the heritage train (Traditionszug), a special made up of historic coaches, which the Mallet locomotives to that point could not haul as their brakes were not compatible with the new compressed-air brakes of the train. In addition it carried out duties from its home station of Gernrode.

== Technical features ==
In designing and building the NWE 21^{II} the firm of Krupp made extensive use of welding, even for the boiler, in contrast with the contemporary design approach of the Reichsbahn Einheitslokomotiven.

The three driven wheelsets are fixed firmly in a bar frame with a 70 mm side thickness (Wangenstärke). The two front and rear carrying axles are able to swing out radially and are housed in a Bissell truck.

The boiler is fed by two feedwater pumps.

The two outside cylinders, which are slightly tilted to cope with the constraints of the rail gauge, are driven by Heusinger valve gear with Kuhn slides. The factory-fitted Schulz piston valves were late replaced by Trofimoff piston valves. These gave better running performance when the locomotive was free-running (Leerlauf) and the regulator was closed, because they practically relieve the cylinder of its job as an air pump when the steam pressure is released.

Together with the locomotives of Class 99.32, which were also permitted to run at up to 50 km/h (31 mph), the engine was one of the five narrow gauge locomotives in Germany with the highest top speed.
