= HK 94–100 =

Heeresfeldbahn HK 94–100
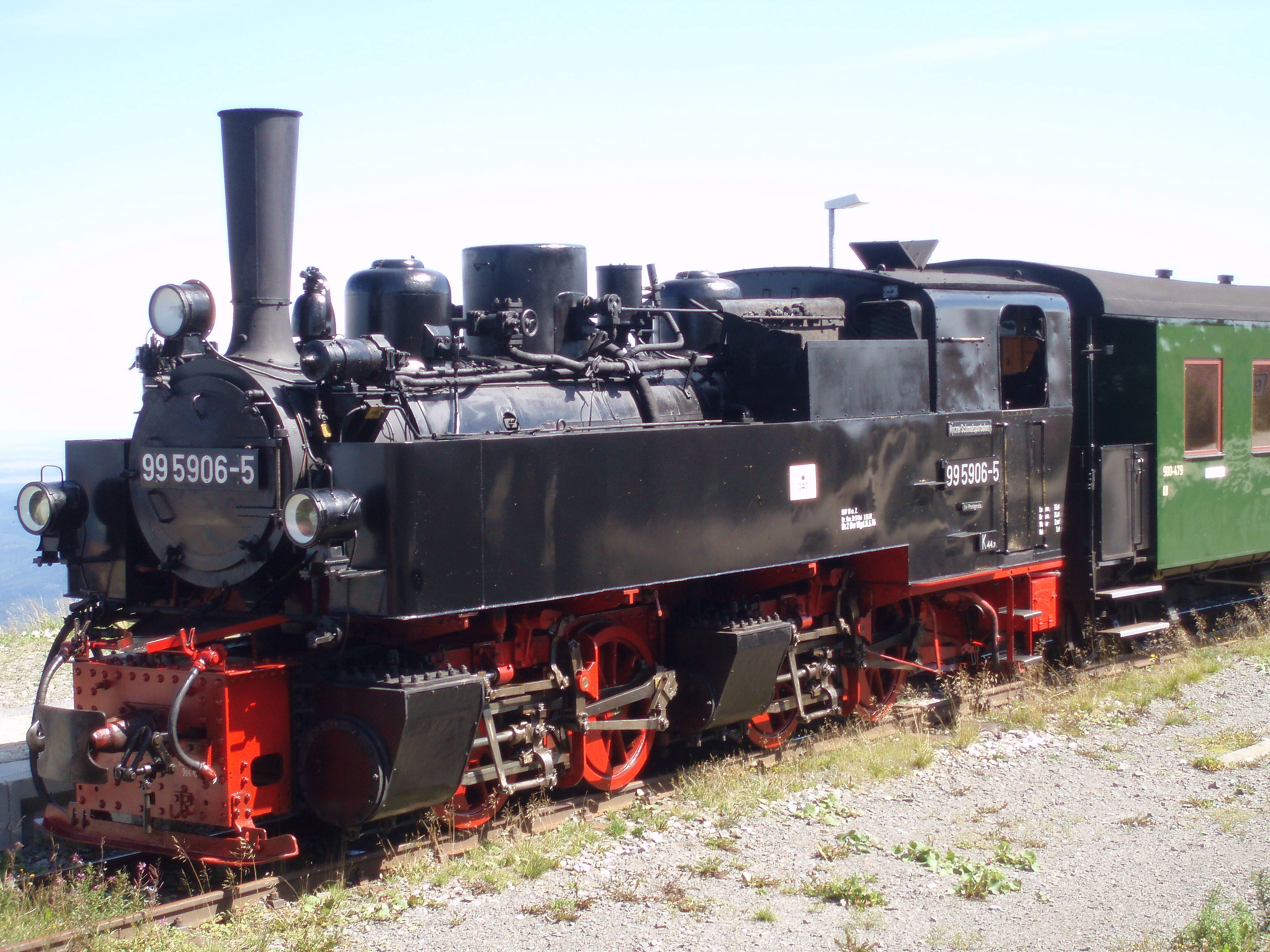
Type and origin
- Builder: Karlsruhe
- Build date: 1918
- Total produced: 7
Specifications
- Configuration
  - Whyte: 0-4-4-0T
  - German: K 44.9
- Gauge: 1,000 mm (3 ft 3 3/8 in) metre gauge
- Driver dia.: 1,000 mm (39.37 in)
- Wheelbase
  - Bogie: 1,400 mm (4 ft 7 1/8 in)
  - Overall: 4,670 mm (15 ft 3 7/8 in)
- Length
  - Over beams: 9,400 mm (30 ft 10 1/8 in)
- Width: 2,700 mm (8 ft 10 1/4 in)
- Height: 3,800 mm (12 ft 5 5/8 in)
- Axle load: 8.5 t (8.4 long tons; 9.4 short tons)
- Adhesive weight: 36 t (35 long tons; 40 short tons)
- Empty weight: 28.5 t (28.0 long tons; 31.4 short tons)
- Service weight: 36 t (35 long tons; 40 short tons)
- Fuel capacity: 1.1 t (1.1 long tons; 1.2 short tons) coal
- Water cap.: 3.77 m^{3} (133 cu ft)
- Boiler
- No. of heating tubes: 133
- Boiler pressure: 12 bar (1.2 MPa; 170 psi)
- Heating surface
  - Firebox: 1.36 m^{2} (14.6 sq ft)
  - Radiative: 5.57 m^{2} (60.0 sq ft)
  - Evaporative: 67.87 m^{2} (730.5 sq ft)
- Cylinders: 4
- High-pressure cylinder: 280 mm (11.02 in)
- Low-pressure cylinder: 425 mm (16.73 in)
- Piston stroke: 500 mm (19.69 in)
- Valve gear: Heusinger
- Parking brake: counterweight handbrake
- Couplers: Equalising lever coupler
Performance figures
- Maximum speed: 30 km/h (19 mph)
- Indicated power: 270 PS (266 hp; 199 kW)
- Tractive effort
  - Starting: 47.76 kN (10,740 lbf)
Career
- Numbers: HK 94–100; EKB 7sm, HVB 27, SEG/MEG 105, NWE 41^{II}, RLE 10^{II}–12^{II}, Albtalbahn 6^{II} DR 99 5906
- Retired: see text

The HK 94–100 is a series of four-axled, German Mallet locomotives with a 1,000 mm (3 ft 3 3/8 in) track gauge.

== History ==
In 1918, the Maschinenbau-Gesellschaft Karlsruhe built seven Mallet locomotives for service on railways operated by the German Army, because the existing locomotives they had commandeered were no longer capable enough. To save time older designs were used. The locomotives were accepted into service by the Army Testing Commission For Field Railways (Heeresprüfkommission für Feldbahnen) or HK, and designated as HK 94 to 100. They were used on the Army's military railways known as Heeresfeldbahnen. The locomotives did not continue in military service, however, due to the end of the war, and were handed over to various private railways, some as substitutes for locomotives that had been commandeered for wartime service. Three locomotives went to the Ruhr-Lippe Railways, and one each to the Euskirchen District Railways, the Haspe-Voerde-Breckerfeld Light Railway, the Nordhausen-Wernigerode Railway Company (NWE) and the Alb Valley Railway. Apart from two, they were all retired by the late 1950s/early 1960s.

In 1928, the loco from Haspe was sold to the South German Railway Company for the Zell im Wiesental–Todtnau railway after the original line had been electrified. From there it went in 1968 to the Blonay-Chamby Museum Railway in Switzerland, where, in 2008, in went into service under its old number, 105.

To supplement its Mallet locomotives (NWE Nos. 11 to 22), in 1920 the NWE bought NWE 41^{II} (there was already a no. NWE 41). This was given number 99 5906 by the East German Deutsche Reichsbahn. In 1955 it was also given to the Selke Valley Railway along with the company's other Mallet locomotives.

The locomotive is externally very similar to the other Mallet engines, only the driver's cab is noticeably different, and all axles are mounted in inside frames (the older engines have an outside frame for the rear two axles). The loco is in working order and is generally used by the Harz Narrow Gauge Railways on the Selke Valley Railway in charge of scheduled trains.

== Design ==
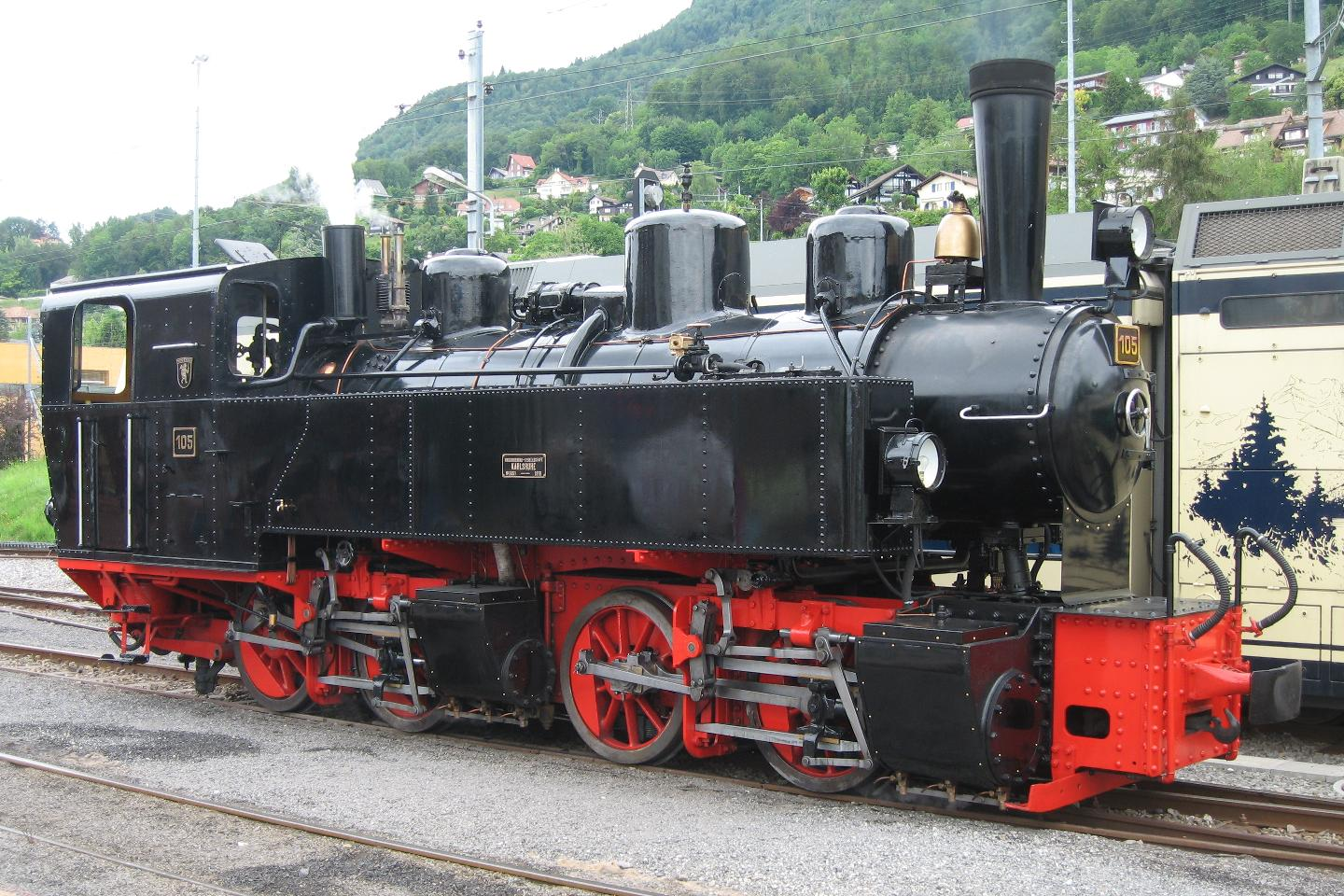
SEG G 2x2/2 105 at Blonay

The rear set of drivers with their high-pressure cylinders is fixed in the plate frame of the loco. The front set of drivers with their low-pressure cylinders are linked to the rear sets with king pins, the rivetted boiler lies on it with its slide plates (Gleitplatten) Leaf springs at the sides hold the driving gear in a central position. Both driving sets have an inside frame.

The steam is fed to the rear cylinders first and from there it passes along flexible pipes to the front cylinders. All cylinders have flat slide valves and outside Heusinger valve gear with lifting links and Kuhn slides.

The locos have a counterweight handbrake and a steam brake as an auxiliary. Depending on the railway, vacuum or compressed air brakes were later fitted as the train brake.

On the boiler are two sand domes, one for each driving set.
