= NWE Nos. 6 and 7 =

NWE Nos. 6–7 Class 99.610
Type and origin
- Builder: Henschel
- Build date: 1914
- Total produced: 2
Specifications
- Configuration
  - UIC: C h2t, C n2t *
  - German: K 33.11
- Gauge: 1,000 mm (3 ft 3 3/8 in) metre gauge
- Driver dia.: 800 mm (31.50 in)
- Wheelbase
  - Overall: 2,500 mm (8 ft 2 3/8 in)
- Length
  - Over beams: 7,734 mm (25 ft 4 1/2 in)
- Width: 2,500 mm (8 ft 2 3/8 in)
- Height: 3,650 mm (11 ft 11 3/4 in)
- Adhesive weight: 32 t (31 long tons; 35 short tons)
- Empty weight: 26 t (26 long tons; 29 short tons)
- Service weight: 32 t (31 long tons; 35 short tons)
- Fuel capacity: 1.1 t (1.1 long tons; 1.2 short tons) coal
- Water cap.: 40 m^{3} (1,400 cu ft)
- Boiler
- No. of heating tubes: 88; 173 *
- No. of smoke tubes: 18; 0 *
- Boiler pressure: 14 bar (1.4 MPa; 200 psi)
- Heating surface
  - Firebox: 1.4 m^{2} (15 sq ft); 1.5 m^{2} (16 sq ft) *
  - Radiative: 4.76 m^{2} (51.2 sq ft); 5.06 m^{2} (54.5 sq ft) *
  - Evaporative: 51.36 m^{2} (552.8 sq ft); 69.65 m^{2} (749.7 sq ft)
- Superheater
  - Heating area: 18.30 m^{2} (197.0 sq ft); 0 *
- Cylinders: 2
- Cylinder size: 430 mm (16.93 in), 400 mm (15.75 in)
- Valve gear: Heusinger with Kuhn slide
- Train brakes: Knorr m. Z.
- Parking brake: counterweight handbrake (Wurfhebel-Handbremse)
- Couplers: Equalising lever coupler
Performance figures
- Maximum speed: 30 km/h (19 mph)
- Indicated power: 280 kW (381 PS; 375 hp); 220 kW (299 PS; 295 hp) *
- Tractive effort
  - Starting: 76.0 kN (7.75 Mp; 17,100 lbf), 65.9 kN (6.72 Mp; 14,800 lbf) *
Career
- Numbers: NWE Nos. 6–7; 99 6101–6102
- * No. 7 / 99 6102

NWE Nos. 6 and 7, later Class 99.610, are narrow gauge tank locomotives with a C axle arrangement that belonged to the Nordhausen-Wernigerode Railway.

The two engines had been supplied to the Army Technical Research Institute (Heerestechnische Prüfungsanstalt) but were transferred in 1917 (superheated steam engine) and 1921 (saturated steam engine) to the Nordhausen-Wernigerode Railway as NWE 6 and NWE 7.

NWE 7 had previously worked as Locomotive No. 15 with the Nassau Light Railway.

Until the 1980s, both engines were used around Wernigerode by the Deutsche Reichsbahn, their last duties being in Rollbock service. The DR gave them new numbers following their nationalisation. Although they had been taken out of service, the Harz Narrow Gauge Railways took both engines over.

- Locomotive 99 6101, formerly NWE 6, now in the care of the Harz Narrow Gauge Railway Society (Interessengemeinschaft Harzer Schmalspurbahnen).
- Locomotive 99 6102, formerly NWE 7, now in the care of the Selke Valley Railway Society (Freundeskreis Selketalbahn).

Only 99 6101 is currently in working order.

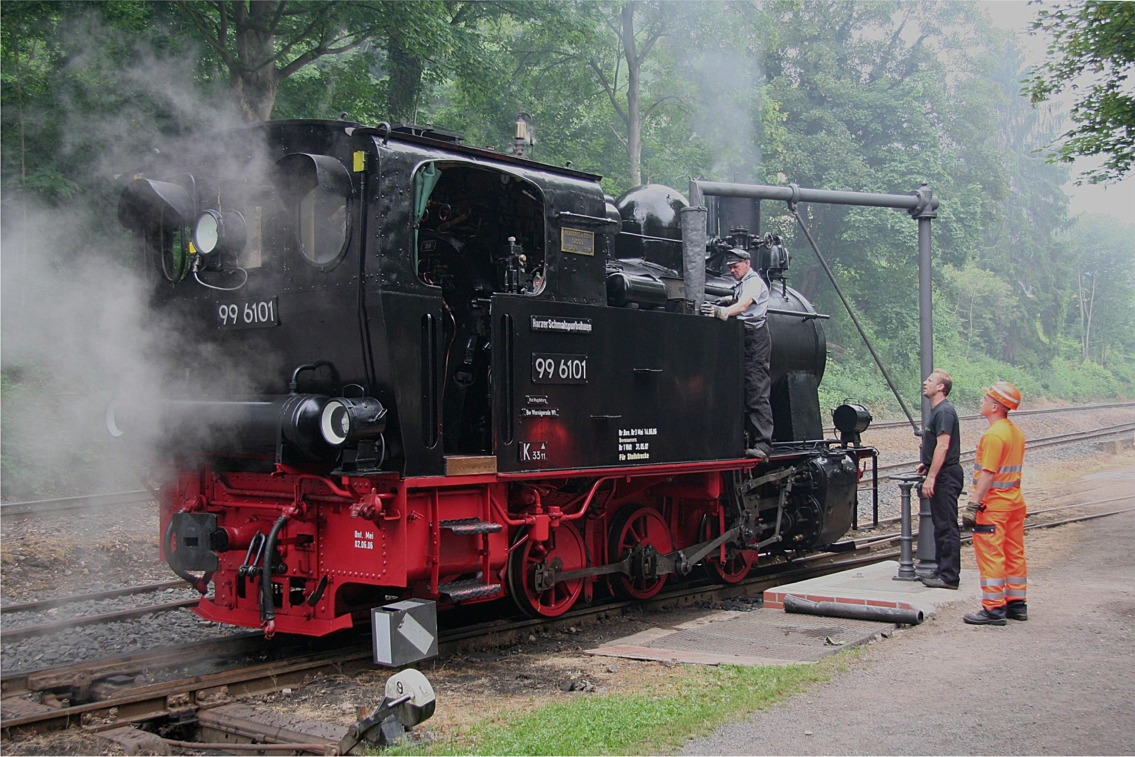
99 6101 takes on water

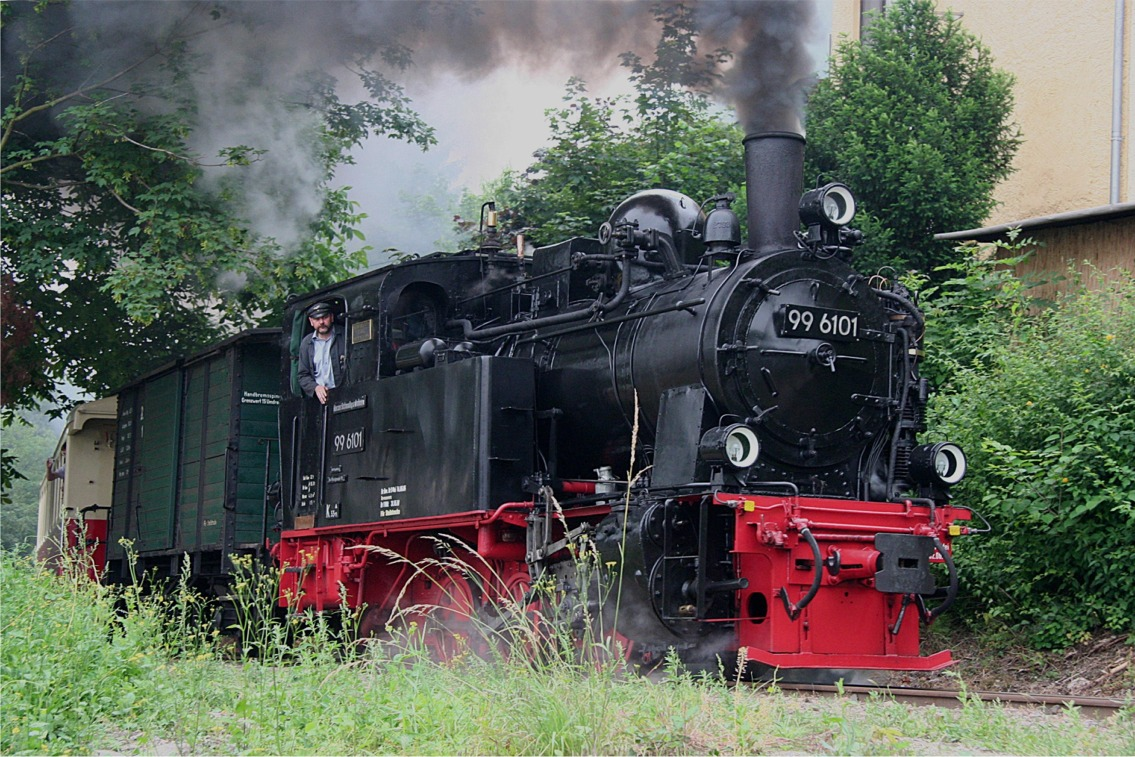
99 6101 heading a heritage train

== Literature ==
- Horst J. Obermayer: Taschenbuch Deutsche Schmalspur-Dampflokomotiven. Franckh, Stuttgart 1971, ISBN 3-440-03818-1
- Hans Röper, Helmut Becker, Werner Dill, Gerhard Zieglgänsberger: Die Harzquer- und Brockenbahn. 3., erweiterte Auflage, Transpress Verlagsgesellschaft, Berlin 1992 ISBN 3-344-70747-7
