= NWE Nos. 11 to 22 =

NWE Nos. 11–22 Class 99.590
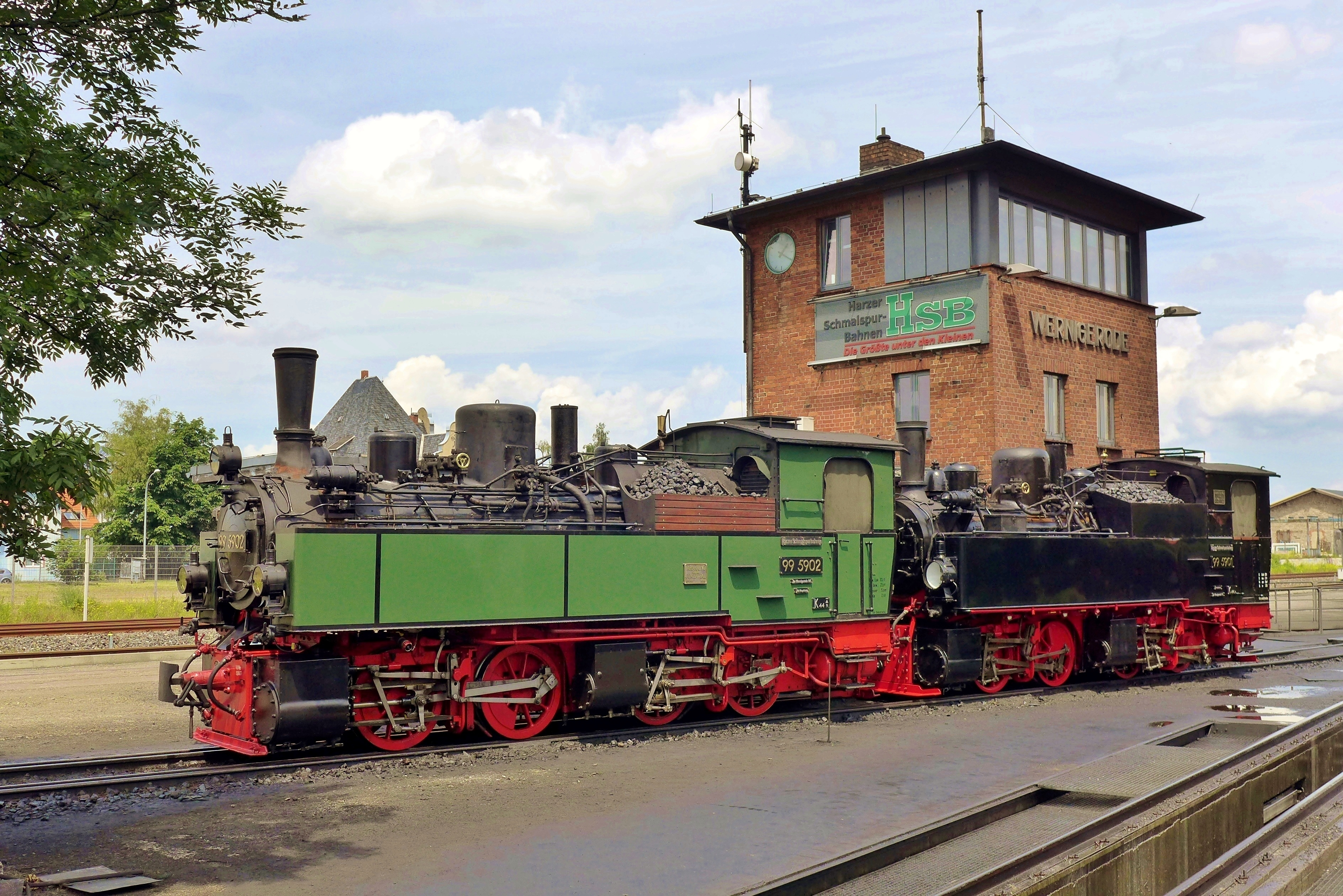
- 99 5902 (left) and 99 5901 (right) at Wernigerode, 2014
Type and origin
- Builder: Arnold Jung and Meckl. Masch.- u. Waggonbau AG Güstrow (MWG)
- Build date: 1897–1901
- Total produced: 12
Specifications
  - German: K 44.9
- Gauge: 1,000 mm (3 ft 3 3/8 in) metre gauge
- Driver dia.: 1,000 mm (39.37 in)
- Wheelbase
  - Bogie: 1,400 mm (55 in)
  - Overall: 4,600 mm (15 ft 1 1/8 in)
- Length
  - Over beams: 8,875 mm (29 ft 1 3/8 in)
- Width: 2,600 mm (8 ft 6 3/8 in)
- Height: 3,900 mm (12 ft 9 1/2 in)
- Axle load: 8.5 t (8.4 long tons; 9.4 short tons)
- Adhesive weight: 34 t (33 long tons; 37 short tons)
- Empty weight: 28 t (28 long tons; 31 short tons)
- Service weight: 34 t (33 long tons; 37 short tons)
- Fuel capacity: 1.5 t (1.5 long tons; 1.7 short tons) coal
- Water cap.: 5 m^{3} (180 cu ft)
- Boiler
- No. of heating tubes: 133
- Boiler pressure: 14 bar (1.4 MPa; 200 psi)
- Heating surface
  - Firebox: 1.39 m^{2} (15.0 sq ft)
  - Radiative: 5.24 m^{2} (56.4 sq ft)
  - Evaporative: 61.34 m^{2} (660.3 sq ft)
- Cylinders: 4
- High-pressure cylinder: 285 mm (11.22 in)
- Low-pressure cylinder: 425 mm (16.73 in)
- Piston stroke: 500 mm (19.69 in)
- Cylinder pressure: high pressure 14 bar (1.4 MPa; 200 psi), low pressure 5 bar (500 kPa; 73 psi), with starting valve (Anfahrventil) max 7 bar (700 kPa; 100 psi)
- Valve gear: Heusinger
- Parking brake: Counterweight handbrake
- Couplers: Equalising lever coupler
Performance figures
- Maximum speed: 30 km/h (19 mph)
- Indicated power: 255 PS (188 kW; 252 hp)
- Tractive effort
  - Starting: 55.79 kN (12,540 lbf)
Career
- Numbers: NWE Nos. 11–22; 99 5901–5905
- Retired: see text

The Nordhausen-Wernigerode Railway Company incorporated twelve Mallet locomotives into its fleet as Numbers 11 to 22. In 1950 the remaining locomotives were renumbered as Class 99.590 by the Deutsche Reichsbahn.

== History ==
In 1897, shortly after the railway company's foundation, the first of a new batch of locomotives was built for the NWE by Arnold Jung in Jungenthal. It was a Mallet engine, numbered NWE 11, with the front two axles in an inside frame and the rear two axles in an outside frame. The fleet quickly grew to 12 locos of which nine were made by Jung from 1897 to 1901 and three by the Mecklenburgische Maschinen- und Waggonbau AG in Güstrow in 1897 . The locomotives were very reliable, but six had to be handed over to the military railways during the World War I (including all three engines built in Güstrow) for use in France, and they never returned from their wartime duties. The remaining six engines received new, larger boilers with a higher performance. In 1927, locomotive NWE 12^{II} suffered a derailment in Thumkuhlenthal upon which it fell off the high embankment. The engine, one passenger coach and the luggage van were so badly damaged that they had to be dismantled on the spot.

In the mid-1950s, the first three newly designed locomotives (Neubauloks) of DR Class 99.23–24 came to the Harz Railway. As a result, the remaining five Mallets were no longer needed on the Nordhausen–Wernigerode line and were transferred to the Selke Valley Railway which suffered from a shortage of motive power. Two were scrapped - 99 5905 in 1975 due to damaged cylinders and an expired boiler certificate and 99 5904 in 1990 reportedly due to a damaged axle - but the remaining three are still in the fleet. 99 5901 suffered an accident in 1977, but could be repaired. After all passenger trains on the Harz narrow gauge lines were fitted with compressed air brakes, the HSB mallets could not be used for passenger duties any more and were stabled. Therefore, while 99 5903 passed inspection in 1991, it could only be used as a helper engine when the Brocken line was reopened. Only in 1992, suitable compressed air braking equipment was found for two engines. 99 5903 was converted first, followed by 99 5901 in 1993. These engines were repainted in their historic green livery with yellow ornamentation.

In addition, they were given their old numbers again: NWE 11 and NWE 13^{II}. 99 5901 was repainted in black in 1998, and received a new, more powerful boiler in 2002. No. 99 5902 was converted to compressed air brakes in 2000. It has now the number NWE 12^{III} and runs in green livery. After its operational certificates expired, maintenance on no. 99 5903 has been deferred.

Harz Narrow Gauge Railways currently operate the following engines of this type:

- 99 5901: not operational,
- 99 5902: not operational,
- 99 5903: certificates expired, stabled in Wernigerode Westentor station.

A similar locomotive is no. 99 5906, but with the rear axles mounted in an inside frame.

== Literature ==
- Obermayer, Horst J. (1971). Taschenbuch Deutsche Schmalspur-Dampflokomotiven. Stuttgart: Franckh. ISBN 3-440-03818-1.
- Röper, Hans; Becker, Helmut; Dill, Werner; Zieglgänsberger, Gerhard (1992). Die Harzquer- und Brockenbahn (3rd expanded ed.). Berlin: Transpress Verlagsgesellschaft. ISBN 3-344-70747-7.
