= DRG Class 99.22 =

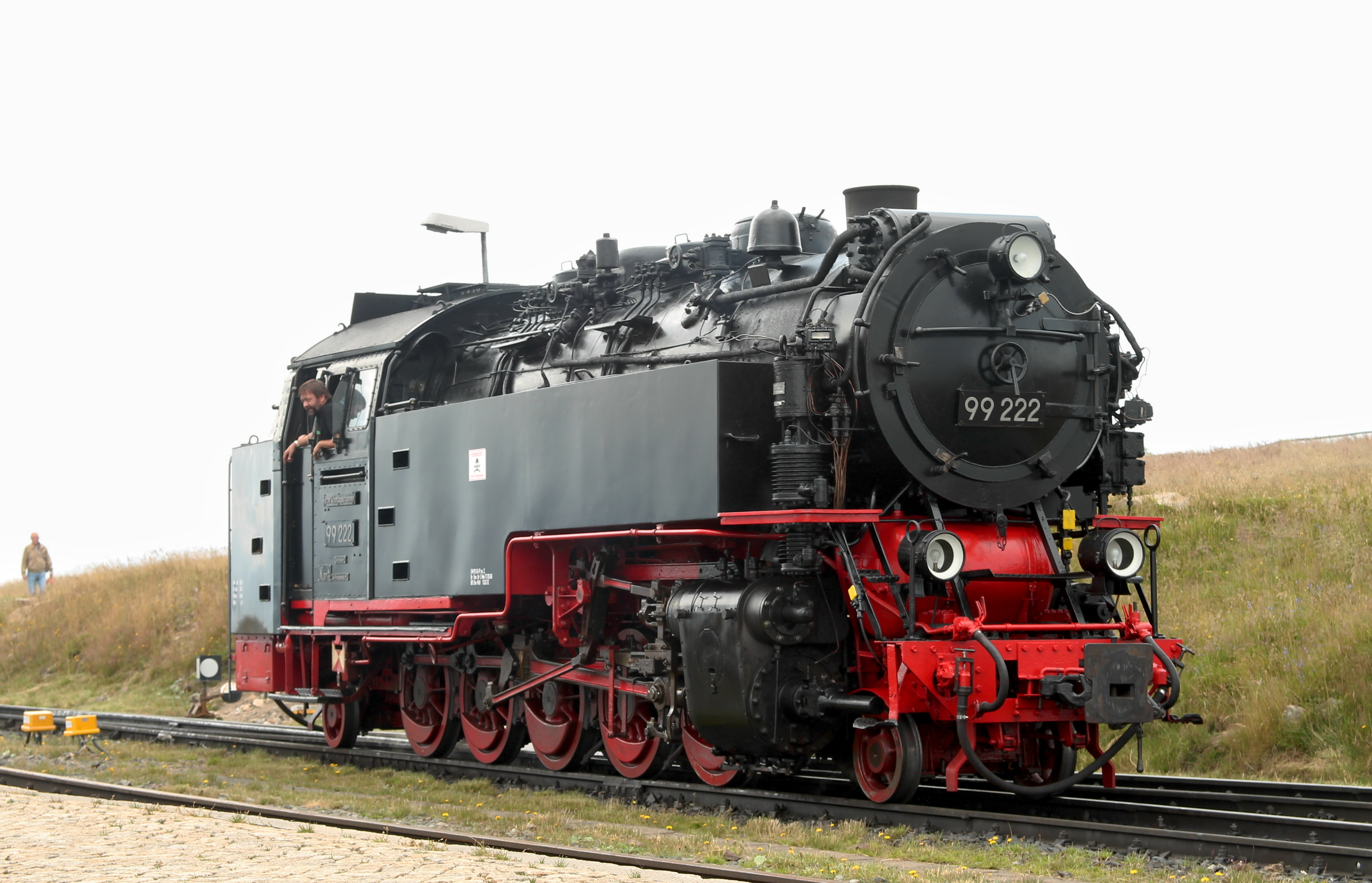
- 99 222 at Brocken, August 2012
Type and origin
- Power type: Steam
- Builder: Berliner Maschinenbau
- Serial number: 9920–9922
- Build date: 1931
- Total produced: 3
Specifications
- Configuration
  - Whyte: 2-10-2T
  - UIC: 1′E1′ h2t
  - German: K 57.10
- Gauge: 1,000 mm (3 ft 3 3/8 in)
- Leading dia.: 550 mm (1 ft 9 5/8 in)
- Driver dia.: 1,000 mm (3 ft 3 3/8 in)
- Trailing dia.: 550 mm (1 ft 9 5/8 in)
- Wheelbase
  - Axle spacing (Asymmetrical): 1,950 mm (6 ft 4 3/4 in) +; 1,200 mm (3 ft 11 1/4 in) +; 1,200 mm (3 ft 11 1/4 in) +; 1,200 mm (3 ft 11 1/4 in) +; 1,200 mm (3 ft 11 1/4 in) +; 1,950 mm (6 ft 4 3/4 in) =
  - Engine: 8,700 mm (28 ft 6 1/2 in)
- Length
  - Over couplers: 11,636 mm (38 ft 2 1/8 in)
- Width: 2,550 mm (8 ft 4 3/8 in)
- Height: 3,650 mm (11 ft 11 11/16 in)
- Axle load: 10.1 t (9.9 long tons; 11.1 short tons)
- Adhesive weight: 50.5 t (49.7 long tons; 55.7 short tons)
- Empty weight: 50.2 t (49.4 long tons; 55.3 short tons)
- Service weight: 65.8 t (64.8 long tons; 72.5 short tons)
- Fuel type: Coal
- Fuel capacity: 3.0 t (3.0 long tons; 3.3 short tons)
- Water cap.: 8.0 m^{3} (1,760 imp gal; 2,110 US gal)
- Firebox
  - Grate area: 1.78 m^{2} (19.2 sq ft)
- Boiler
  - Pitch: 2,550 mm (8 ft 4 3/8 in)
  - Tube plates: 3,500 mm (11 ft 5 3/4 in)
  - Small tubes: 44.5 mm (1 3/4 in), 114 off
  - Large tubes: 118 mm (4 5/8 in), 32 off
- Boiler pressure: 14 bar (14.3 kgf/cm^{2}; 203 psi)
- Heating surface
  - Firebox: 7.7 m^{2} (83 sq ft)
  - Tubes: 49.5 m^{2} (533 sq ft)
  - Flues: 38.7 m^{2} (417 sq ft)
  - Total surface: 95.9 m^{2} (1,032 sq ft)
- Superheater
  - Heating area: 33.0 m^{2} (355 sq ft)
- Cylinders: Two, outside
- Cylinder size: 500 mm × 500 mm (19 11/16 in × 19 11/16 in)
- Valve gear: Heusinger (Walschaerts)
- Train brakes: originally K-P m.Z. and Schleifer driver's brake valve. Hardy vacuum brake with auxiliary brake. †; KE-P m.Z. ‡
- Parking brake: Counterweight brake
- Couplers: Janney centre buffer couplings
Performance figures
- Maximum speed: 40 km/h (25 mph) in regular service (83 km/h (52 mph) maximum recorded)
- Indicated power: 650–750 PS (478–552 kW; 641–740 hp)
- Tractive effort: 102.97 kN (23,150 lbf)
Career
- Operators: Deutsche Reichsbahn; → Deutsche Reichsbahn (GDR) (1)
- Numbers: DRG: 99 221 – 99 223; DR from 1970: 99 7222-5

The three engines of DRG Class 99.22 were standard, narrow gauge locomotives (Einheitsloks) in service with the German Reichsbahn. They had operating numbers 99 221 to 99 223.

They were built and deployed for the railway line from Eisfeld to Schönbrunn. In 1944, during the course of the Second World War, locomotives 99 221 and 99 223 went to the Thamshavnbanen copper ore line in Norway. After the end of the war they stayed there and were later scrapped. Locomotive 99 222 remained on duty until 1966 on its original route, but when it became clear that the end was nigh, it transferred to the Harz and is in service today on the network of the Harz Narrow Gauge Railways (Harzer Schmalspurbahnen or HSB) between Nordhausen, Quedlinburg and Wernigerode.

The Class 99.22 is the most powerful of the German narrow gauge steam locomotives and had Bissel axles. In addition the coal tank tapered toward the back. One feature was the Janney automatic centre buffer coupling. After its transfer to the Harzquerbahn, 99 222 was converted to the normal compensating coupling with central buffer. This conversion can be clearly recognised by the cutouts in the buffer beam.

The locomotives had a Walschaerts valve gear driving the third axle.

On the introduction of the DR's new EDP numbering scheme in 1970 the engine was given operating number 99 7222, which she carries to this day because the HSB has retained the DR numbering from 1970.

The new DR Class 99.23-24 locomotives were built on the basis of the Einheitsloks. Differences in the new engines are the feedwater heater and the bar frame.

- 99 221 last duties: Thamshavnbanen (Norway) - scrapped in 1953
- 99 222 in service with the HSB
- 99 223 last duties: Thamshavnbanen (Norway) - scrapped in 1947

== See also ==
- List of DRG locomotives and railbuses
