= Center buffer coupling =

A Center buffer coupling may refer to:

- A Centre Buffer Coupler
- A centre buffer coupling
- A balance lever coupling
- A center-buffer coupler
- An ABC coupler
