= Nordhausen-Wernigerode Railway Company =

Railway company in Germany

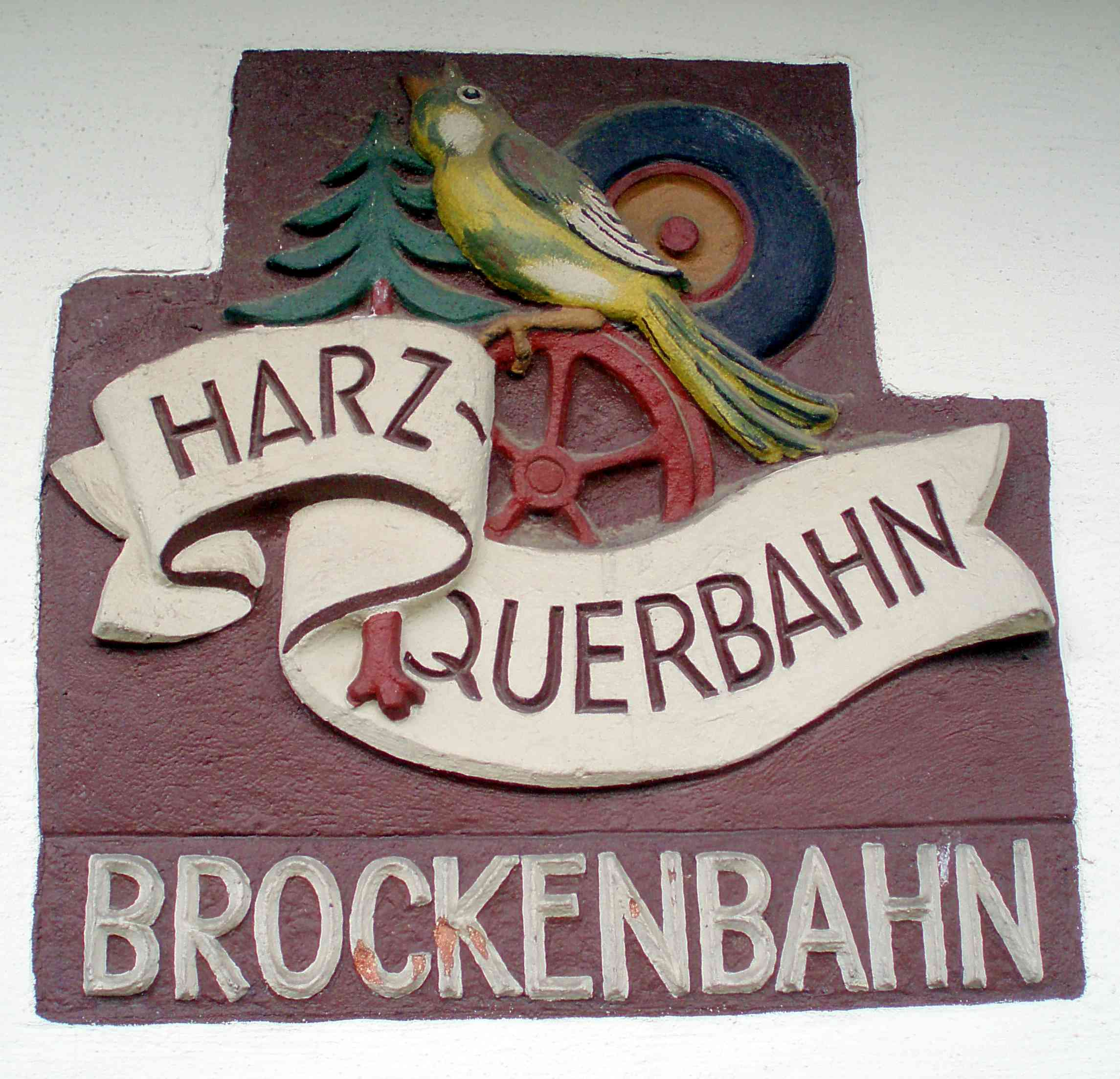
Emblem of the Harzquerbahn

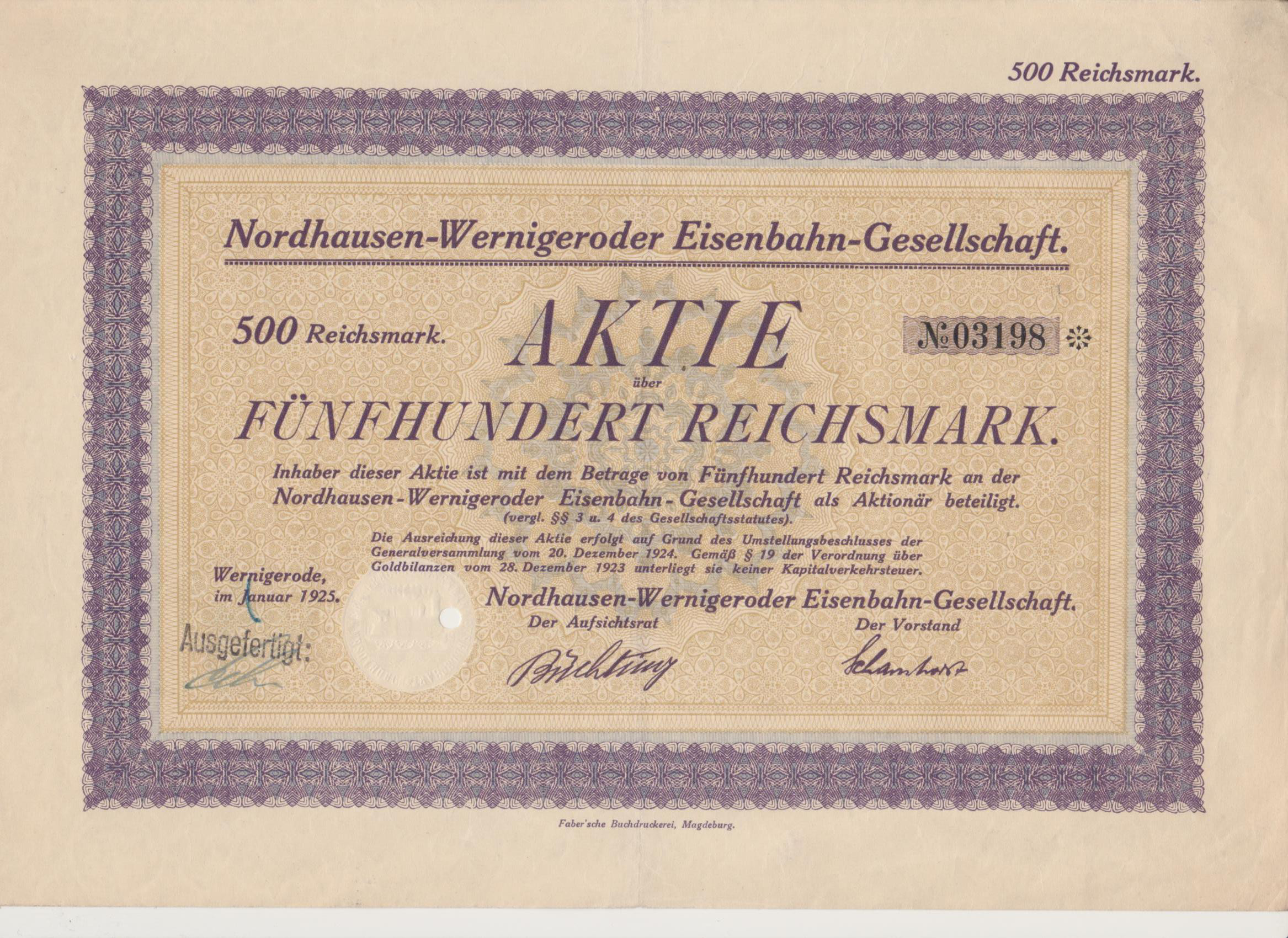
Share of the Nordhausen-Wernigeroder Eisenbahn-Gesellschaft, issued January 1925

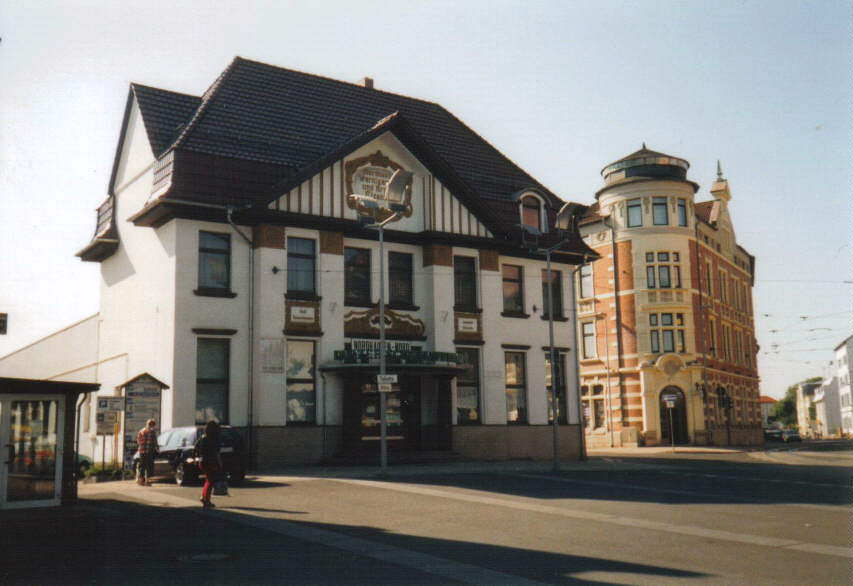
Nordhausen Nord station

The Nordhausen-Wernigerode Railway Company (Nordhausen-Wernigeroder Eisenbahn-Gesellschaft) or NWE was the second railway company to be founded in the Harz mountains in Germany, after the Gernrode-Harzgerode Railway Company (Gernroder-Harzgeroder Eisenbahn). On 15 June 1896 the NWE was formed by the Vereinigten Eisenbahnbau- und Betriebs-Gesellschaft in Berlin, who also ran its operations. As early as 1896 the first section of this narrow gauge Harz Railway ('Harzquerbahn') was opened, followed in 1898 by the Brocken Railway (Brockenbahn), which was also narrow gauge. On 1 April 1908, the NWE took over operations from the Vereinigten Eisenbahnbau- und Betriebsgesellschaft.

The junction with the Gernroder-Harzgerode railway (the Selke Valley Railway or Selketalbahn) was in Eisfelder Talmühle and that with the South Harz Railway (Südharzeisenbahn) was in Sorge. At Nordhausen and Wernigerode stations there were junctions with the standard gauge trains of the Prussian state railways, later the Deutsche Reichsbahn. At Drei-Annen-Hohne was a connexion with the Halberstadt-Blankenburg railway.

Around 1925 the NWE had about 250 employees and about 100 seasonal workers. From 1926 the NWE also ran bus routes (known as the Harzer Roller or 'Harz rollers'). Its workshop and management was located in Wernigerode.

The NWE was expropriated by a 'people's decision' and went into the Saxony-Anhalt state railways in 1948. The two routes were run by the DR from 1949. Since 1993 the Harz Narrow Gauge Railways (Harzer Schmalspurbahnen) has been the owner and operator of the Harz Railway, Brocken Railway and Selke Valley Railway.

== Motive power ==
Designation	DR (GDR) number	Preserved	Built	Remarks
NWE Nos. 1 to 3	99 5804 and 5803	-	1897	
NWE Nos. 6 and 7	99 6101 and 6102	Yes	1914	superheated/saturated steam loco
NWE Nos. 11 to 22	99 5901 to 5905	99 5901–5903	1897–1901	Mallet locomotive
NWE No. 21^{II}	99 6001	Yes	1939	Standard locomotive (prototype)
NWE Nos. 31 and 32	-		1909	Sold in 1921
NWE Nos. 41 and 42	-		1913	Sold in 1917
NWE No. 41^{II}	99 5906	Yes	1918	Mallet locomotive
NWE Nos. 51 and 52	99 6011 and 6012	-	1922/23	
NWE No. 61	-		1899	†1934
NWE No. 61^{II}	98 6213	-	1908	Standard gauge loco, for factory lines in Nordhausen
NWE T 1 to 3	VT 137 561, 565, 566	T 3 = 187 025	1939	Driving railcar

Only on paper were the two Reichsbahn engines 99 5631 and 5632 given the designation NWE Nos. 71 and 72.

== See also ==
- Harz Narrow Gauge Railways
