= Selke Valley Railway =

Railway line in Germany

Coordinates: 51.6256°N 11.0318°E

Quedlinburg–Hasselfelde railway
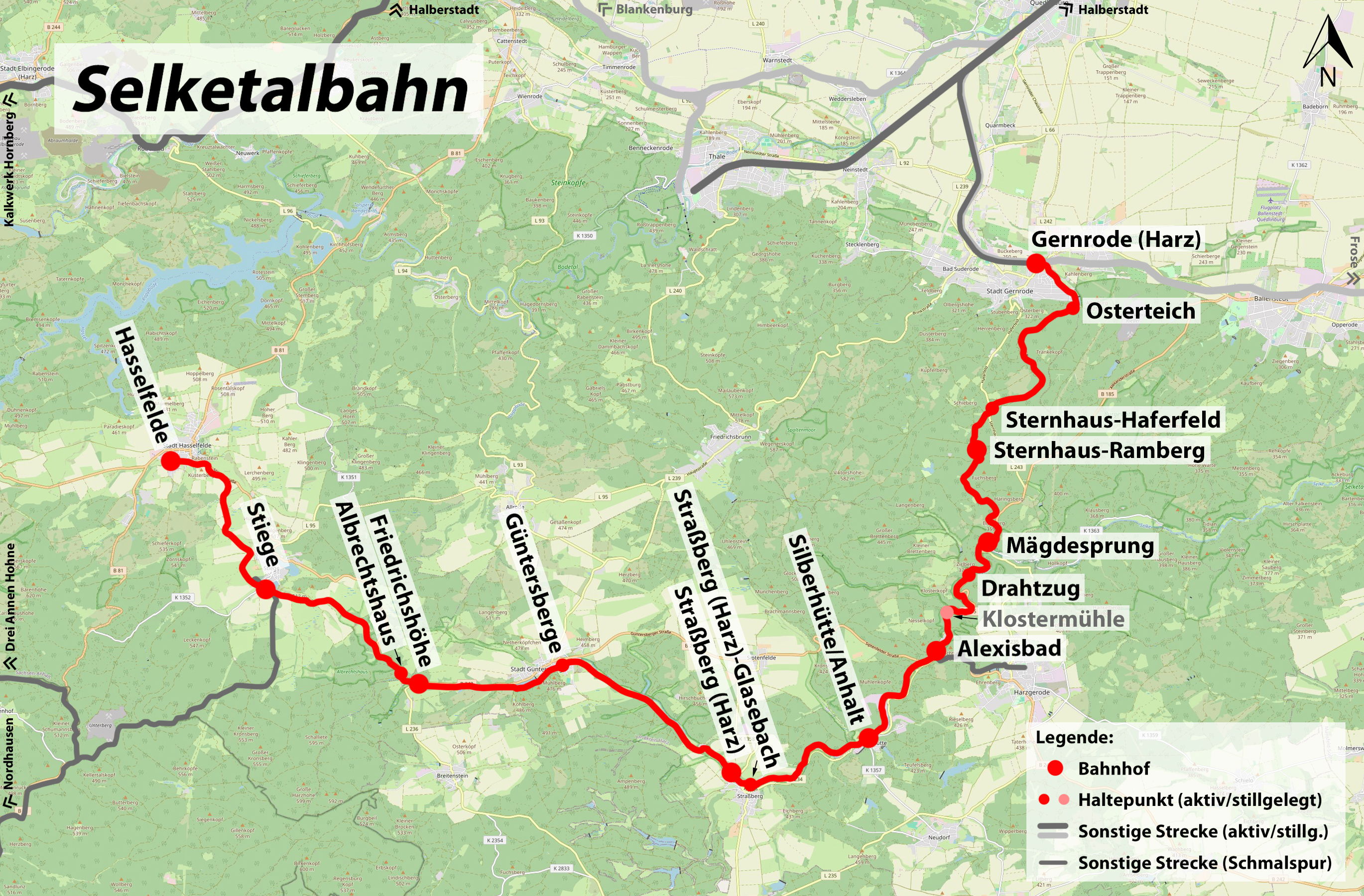

Overview
- Line number: 333
- Locale: Saxony-Anhalt, Germany

Service
- Route number: 9703

Technical
- Line length: 43.3 km (26.9 mi)
- Track gauge: 1,000 mm (3 ft 3 3/8 in) metre gauge
- Minimum radius: 60 m (197 ft)
- Operating speed: 50 km/h (31.1 mph) (maximum)
- Maximum incline: 4.02%

The Selke Valley Railway (Selketalbahn), Gernrode-Harzgerode Railway (Gernroder-Harzgeroder Eisenbahn) and the Anhalt Harz Railway (Anhaltische Harzbahn) were different names for the metre gauge railway in the Lower Harz, Germany, originally owned by the Gernrode-Harzgerode Railway Company (Gernrode-Harzgeroder Eisenbahn-Gesellschaft, GHE).

It is now only known as the Selke Valley Railway. This has included the Quedlinburg–Gernrode line since 2006. It continues through Alexisbad to Hasselfelde and includes the Alexisbad–Harzgerode branch and the Stiege–Eisfelder Talmühle connecting line. All of them are now owned by the Harz Narrow Gauge Railways (Harzer Schmalspurbahnen). The line follows the Selke river between Mägdesprung and Albrechtshaus.

== History ==
=== Opening and early years ===
The Gernrode–Mägdesprung railway was opened by the Gernrode-Harzgerode Railway Company (Gernrode-Harzgeroder Eisenbahn-Gesellschaft, GHE) after a construction period of 316 days on 7 August 1887. The Selke Valley Railway is the oldest narrow gauge railway in the Harz Mountains. Because of the terrain conditions and for cost reasons, Localbahn-Bau und Betriebs-Gesellschaft Wilhelm Hostmann & Co. from Hanover was awarded the contract to build the 1000 mm gauge railway. Services were initially hauled by three powerful steam locomotives called Gernerode, Harzgerode and Selke. The line was extended in stages to Hasselfelde by 1892. After the opening of the Stiege–Eisfelder Talmühle railway by the Nordhausen-Wernigerode Railway Company (Nordhausen-Wernigeroder Eisenbahn-Gesellschaft, NWE) on 15 July 1905, a connection existed to the Harz Railway (Harzquerbahn). Because of the increased demand for both passenger and freight traffic, three more steam locomotives had been put into service by the turn of the century, the Güntersberge, the Alexisbad and the Hasselfelde.

=== Developments after the Second World War ===
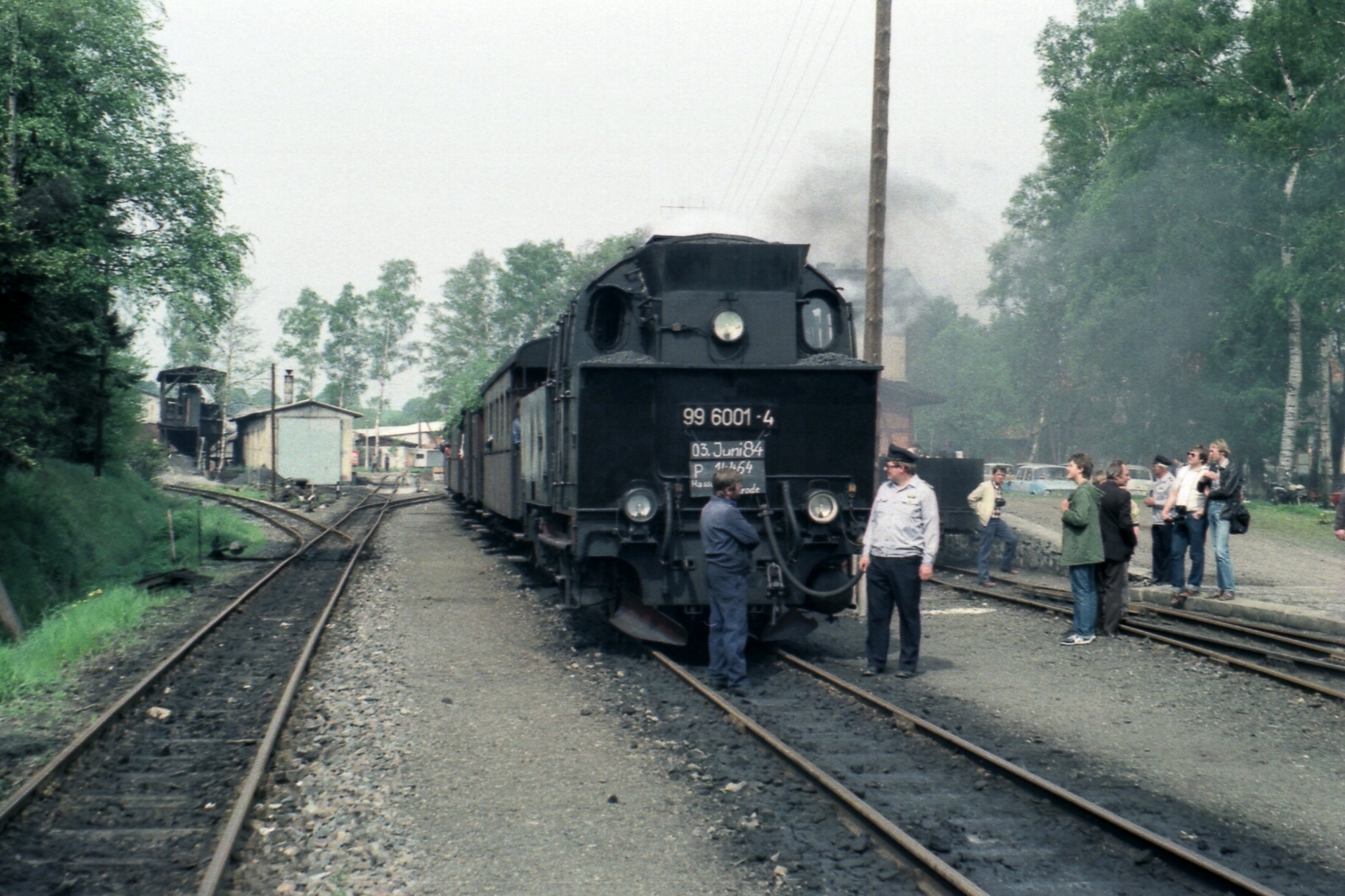
Locomotive 99 6001 in Hasselfelde before running from Stieg to Straßberg on 3 June 1984

Alexisbad–Harzgerode railway

Overview
- Line number: 333

Service
- Route number: 9704

Technical
- Line length: 2.9 km (1.8 mi)
- Track gauge: 1,000 mm (3 ft 3 3/8 in) metre gauge
- Operating speed: 20 km/h (12.4 mph) (maximum)

Stiege–Eisfelder Talmühle railway

Overview
- Line number: 333

Service
- Route number: 9702

Technical
- Line length: 8.6 km (5.3 mi)
- Track gauge: 1,000 mm (3 ft 3 3/8 in) metre gauge
- Operating speed: 25 km/h (15.5 mph) (maximum)

In the spring of 1946, the Eisfelder Talmühle–Hasselfelde and Herzogschacht–Lindenberg sections of the Selke Valley Railway were dismantled and almost all the rolling stock and track material was sent as reparations to the former Soviet Union. The operational management between Efelder Talmühle and Hasselfelde was transferred to the NWE from 15 April 1946.

Because of its importance for the transport of fluorite, reconstruction began in the autumn of 1946 between Gernrode and Lindenberg (now Straßberg), which dragged on because of lack of material until 1950. The Lindenberg–Stiege section was not initially rebuilt. The GHE was nationalised in 1946 and it was absorbed by Deutsche Reichsbahn (DR) on 1 April 1949.

In 1983, the reconstruction of the Straßberg–Stiege section was approved, especially to ensure the supply of lignite from Nordhausen to the new cogeneration plant of Silberhütte. Scheduled passenger services between Hasselfelde and Gernrode were resumed on 3 June 1984. Since then, the three Harz narrow gauge lines (Selke Valley Railway, Harz Railway and Brocken Railway—Brockenbahn) have again been connected as one network, now 140 kilometres-long. On 1 February 1993, the Harz Narrow Gauge Railways (Harzer Schmalspurbahnen GmbH, HSB) took over the Harz Railway, the Brocken Railway and the Selke Valley Railway from DR.

=== The extension to Quedlinburg ===
Rail traffic on the standard gauge Quedlinburg–Gernrode–Ballenstedt–Frose railway ended in Gernrode after a signal box fire in Ballenstedt. Deutsche Bahn saw itself as no longer able to operate the line economically and the Gernrode–Frose section was closed. The Harz Narrow Gauge Railways took over the Quedlinburg–Gernrode section and began the conversion of the around 8.5 kilometres-long section of the Selke Valley Railway to Quedlinburg to metre gauge on 18 April 2005. The railway supervisory authority of Saxony-Anhalt approved operations over the line on 17 February 2006 and it was opened on 4 March with festivities and special trains. Since various remaining works had to be carried out, only a few special trains operated until the start of scheduled passenger traffic on 26 June 2006. The 2017 timetable shows six pairs of trains a day between Gernrode and Quedlinburg, two of which are hauled by locomotives.

== Route ==
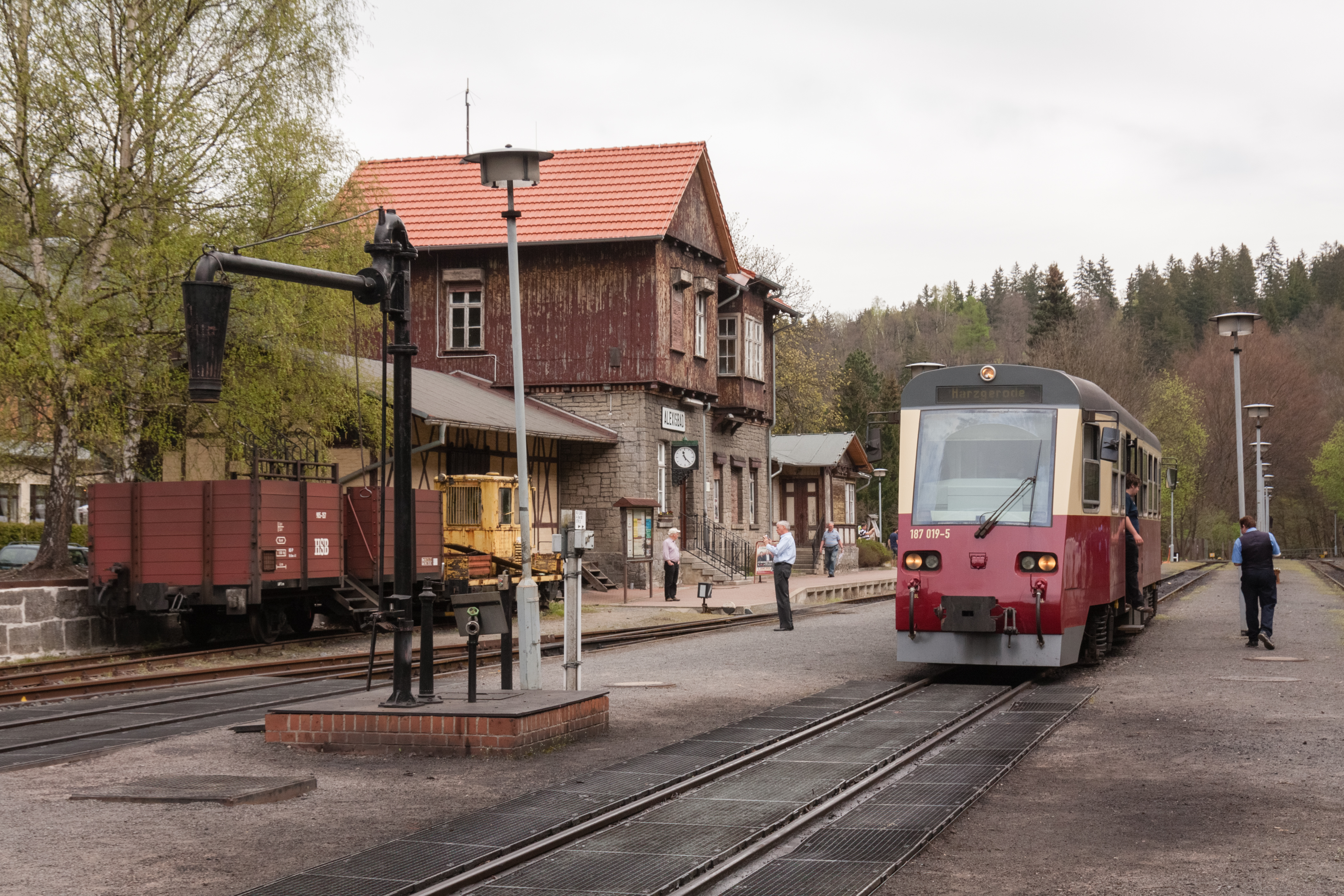
Alexisbad station with new railcar

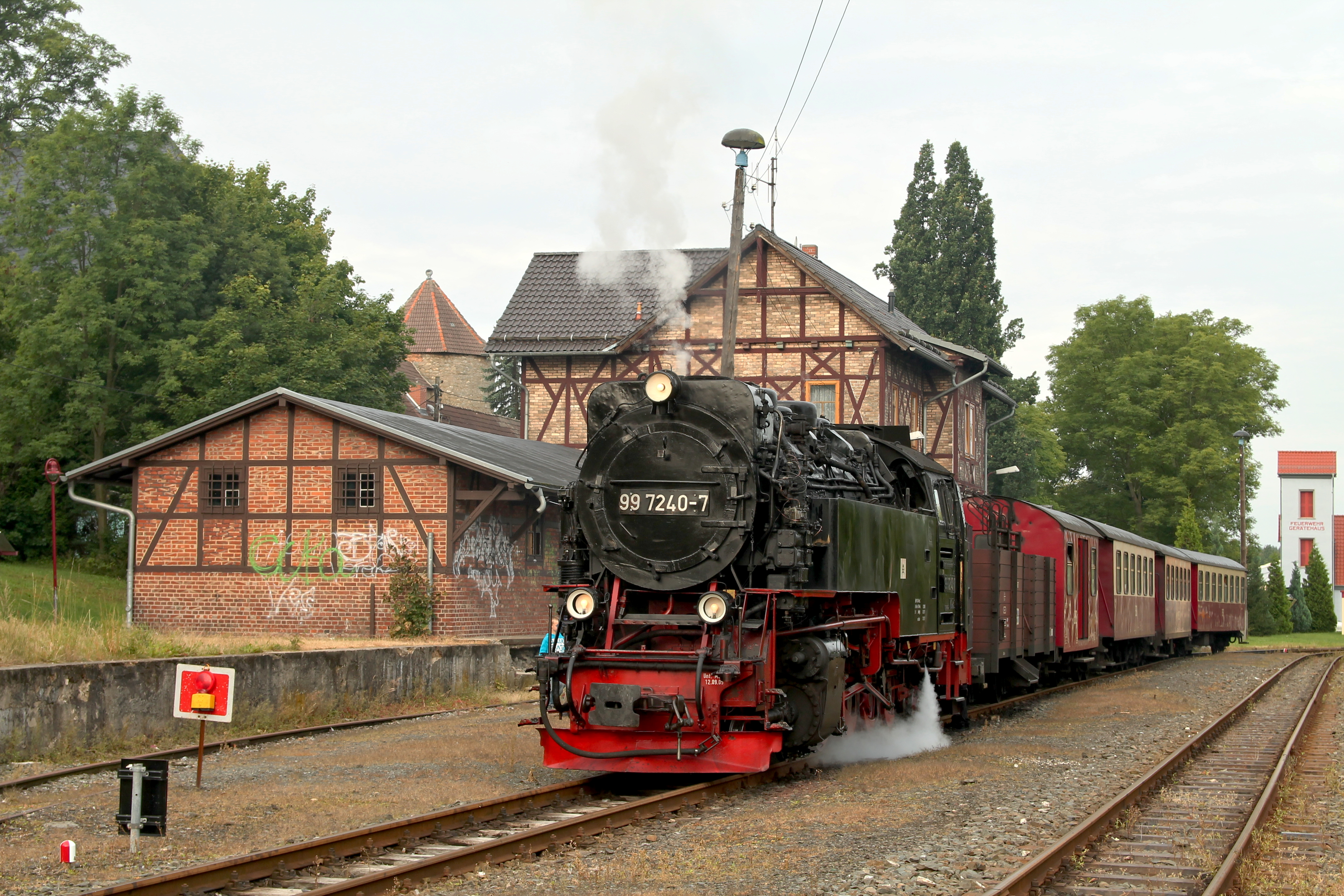
Steam train in Harzgerode station

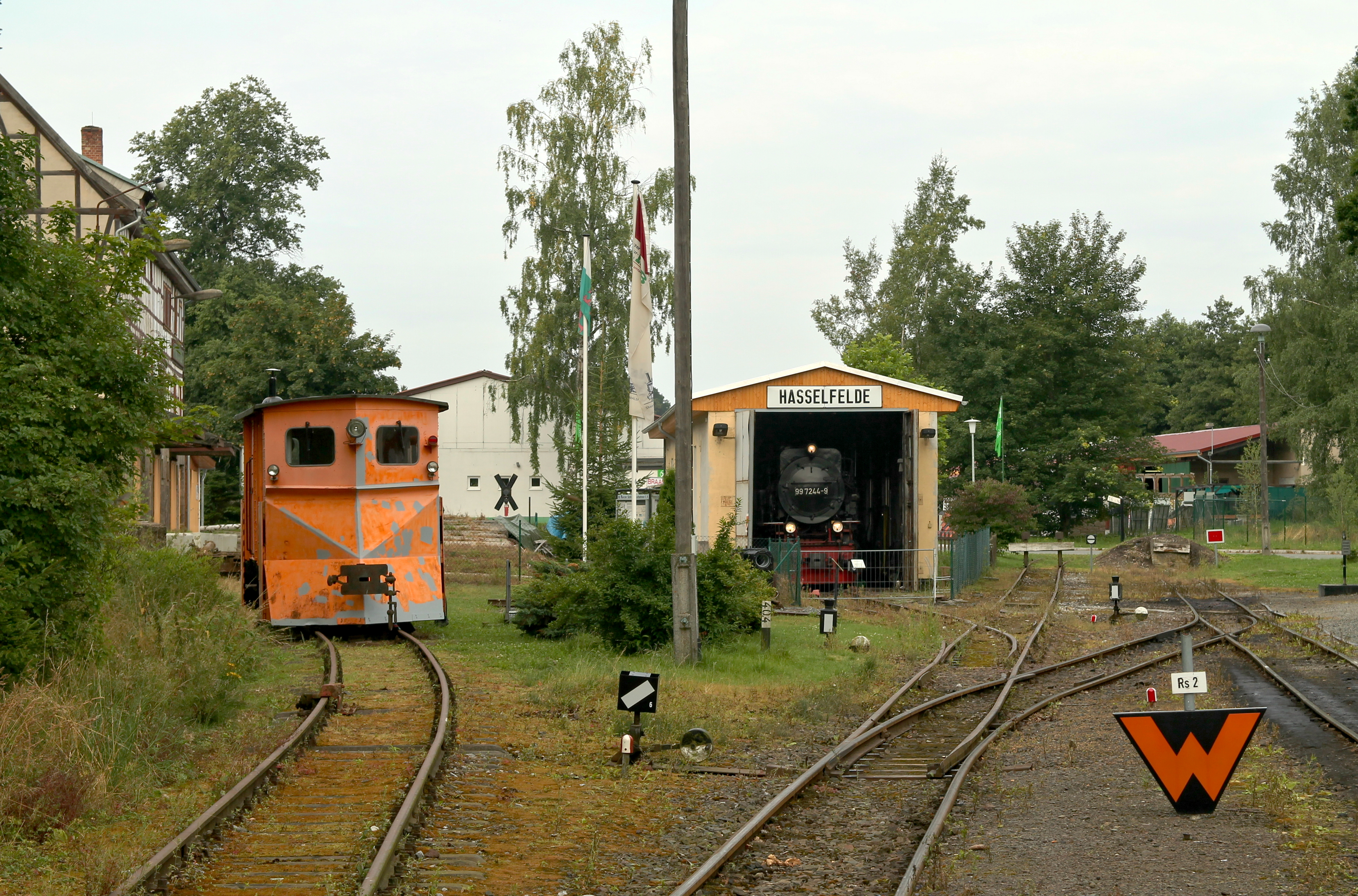
Historical Hasselfelde locomotive shed with old rolling stock

From Quedlinburg, the Selke Valley Railway runs for a few kilometres parallel with the standard gauge line to Thale until the newly-laid narrow gauge track turns to the south. This is followed by the stations of Quedlinburg-Quarmbeck and Bad Suderode (both reopened in 2006), before Gernrode station is reached. Now the old route of the Magdeburg–Halberstadt Railway Company branched off towards Frose and the line continues along the original Selke Valley Railway. The line runs past the halt (Haltepunkt) of Osterteich, next to the artificial pond of the same name, and through the Ostergrund. Past the Heiliger Teich ("holy pond", an artificial pond, which was built on the site of a pond that was believed in the Middle Ages to have health-giving properties) the line climbs through Sternhaus-Haferfeld station and continues to Sternhaus-Ramberg station. Like the previous one, this is located in the middle of a forest. After Sternhaus-Ramberg station, the line descends into the valley of the Selke. This section is the steepest in the entire network of Harz narrow gauge railways. The narrow valley of the Selke is reached by Mägdesprung station. The line now follows the course of the river to Alexisbad. The numerous rock cuttings that the railway must pass through demonstrate the difficulty of engineering the line. After passing the small halt of Drahtzug, the line reaches the village of Alexisbad. Alexisbad station, which is also the starting point of the branch to Harzgerode, lies at the end of the small town. Subsequently, the branch line climbs out of the narrow valley of the Selke onto the plateau of Harzgerode. The first section of the Selke Valley Railway ended at Harzgerode station.

From Alexisbad station, which is known for its simultaneous departures of two steam locomotives, the second line of the Selke Valley Railway continues through the Selke Valley towards Stiege, firstly to Silberhütte. Passing small factories, the line continues its journey via Straßberg, which has a halt as well as its main station, and continues to Güntersberge. After Güntersberge, the railway continues to climb, passing through Friedrichshöhe and Albrechtshaus stations to Stiege station. Since 1905, the connection to the Harz Railway has branched off here. This short line, the second section of the GHE, ends in Hasselfelde, also on a high plateau.

The connecting line to the Harz Railway runs from Stiege station up to the highest point at 523 metres above sea level near the halt of Birkenmoor and then downhill through the Bere valley. In the Bere valley, which is surrounded by high ranges, the railway crosses two side valleys on two large bridges, before reaching the Harz Railway and Eisfelder Talmühle station.

== Rail operations ==
=== Passenger services ===
The route is used daily by steam trains and railcars. According to the summer and winter timetable, there are five daily services in both directions over the whole route, some with changes in Alexisbad and Stiege, as well as on the side branches to Harzgerode and Hasselfelde (2016/2017 timetable). Other trains run between Quedlinburg or Gernrode and Alexisbad. The number of pairs of trains operated by steam trains or diesel railcars is approximately the same in the summer timetable, with railcars predominating in the winter half-year. Although the Selke Valley Railway has some importance for regional traffic on the Quedlinburg–Gernrode section, the passengers on the other sections of the line are mostly tourists, people on excursions and hikers.

Since April 2010, steam trains have also run regularly on the connecting line (Stiege–Eisfelder Talmühle); before 1996 it was exclusively served by diesel multiple units. Depending on the timetable, there may be simultaneous departures from Eisfelder Talmühle, Stiege and Alexisbad.

=== Freight ===
Today, scheduled freight trains operate on the Selke Valley Railway only on the short section from the Hartsteinwerk Unterberg to Eisfelder Talmühle station: the Hartsteinwerk Unterberg regularly transports standard gauge gravel wagons on Rollbocks to the transfer yard in Nordhausen (Harz Railway). There are two converted diesel locomotives of class 199.8 available and equipment for transporting standard gauge freight cars.

=== Rolling stock ===
In Gernrode and Nordhausen Nord are the locomotive depots for the Selke Valley Railway. The diesel railcars of the Selke Valley Railway are based in Nordhausen Nord. Both locomotives and motor coaches are serviced and the steam locomotives are fueled and cleaned.

The rolling stock of the Selke Valley Railway, like all HSB rolling stock, are maintained in Wernigerode-Westerntor. This is the location of the HSB's central rolling stock depot, where all examinations and repair work are performed on all rolling stock. For the main examinations, however, the locomotives are taken to special maintenance facilities.

== Peculiarities ==
Compared to the Harz Railway and the Brocken Railway, the Selke Valley Railway has some special features:

- The stretch out of the northern edge of the Harz is a very varied landscape up to the high levels of the middle Harz mountains.
- While on the Wernigerode–Brocken railway in normal traffic steam locomotives of DR classes 99.23–24 are used in particular, one-of-a-kind steam engines are used on the Selke Valley Railway (99 6101 and 6102, 99 6001 and 99 5906).
- The Selke Valley Railway traverses a slope of 1:25 (4%), which is the steepest track used in the Harz mountains. The Brocken Railway traverses more elevation but does so at a shallower gradient of 1:30 (3.333%).
- Stiege Station has the smallest terminal loop of any public railway. This is a balloon loop which was constructed specifically to allow heavy trains to the power station at Silberhutte from Nordhausen to continue in the direction of Silberhutte without reversing.
