= Gernrode-Harzgerode Railway Company =

German transport company

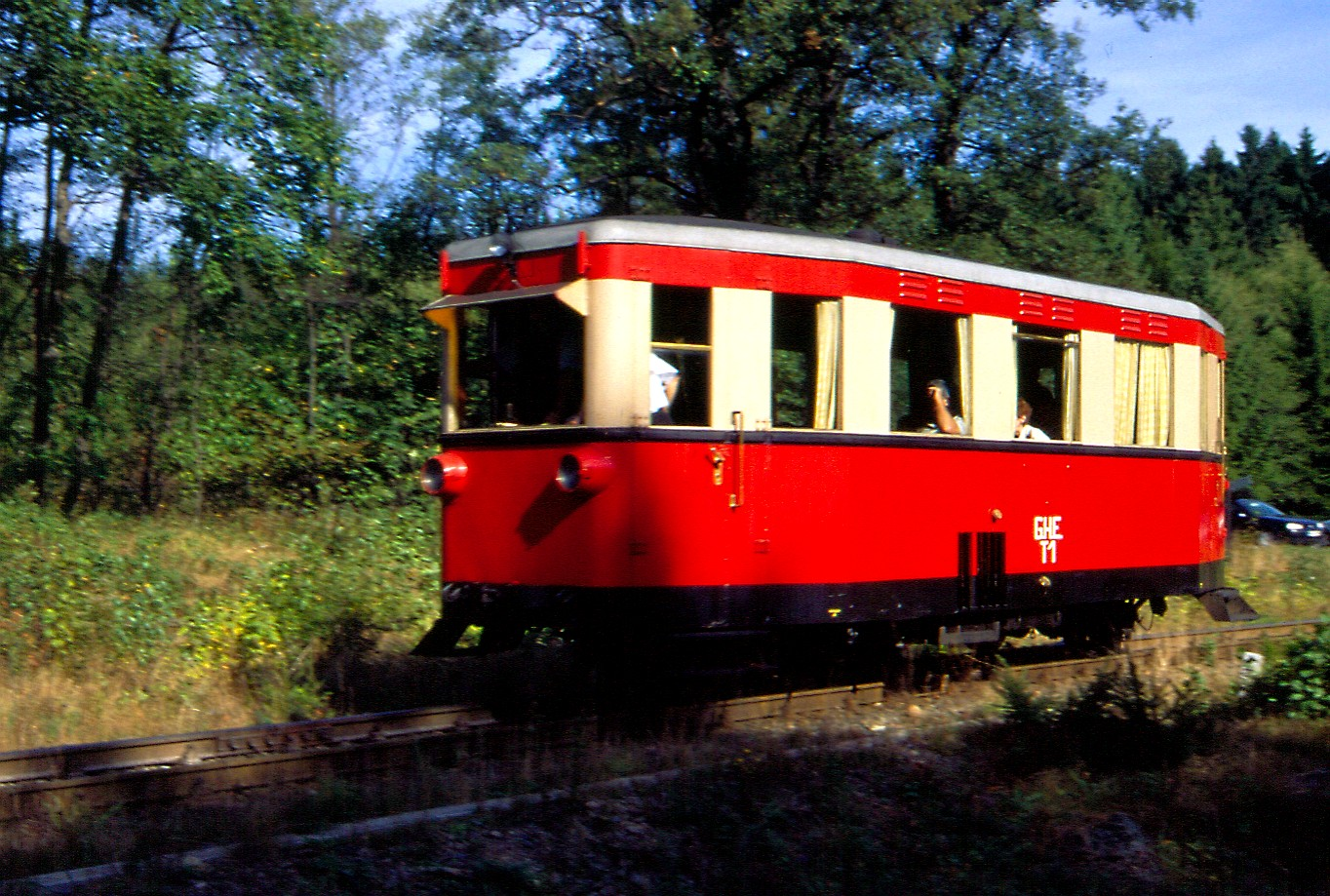
GHE T 1

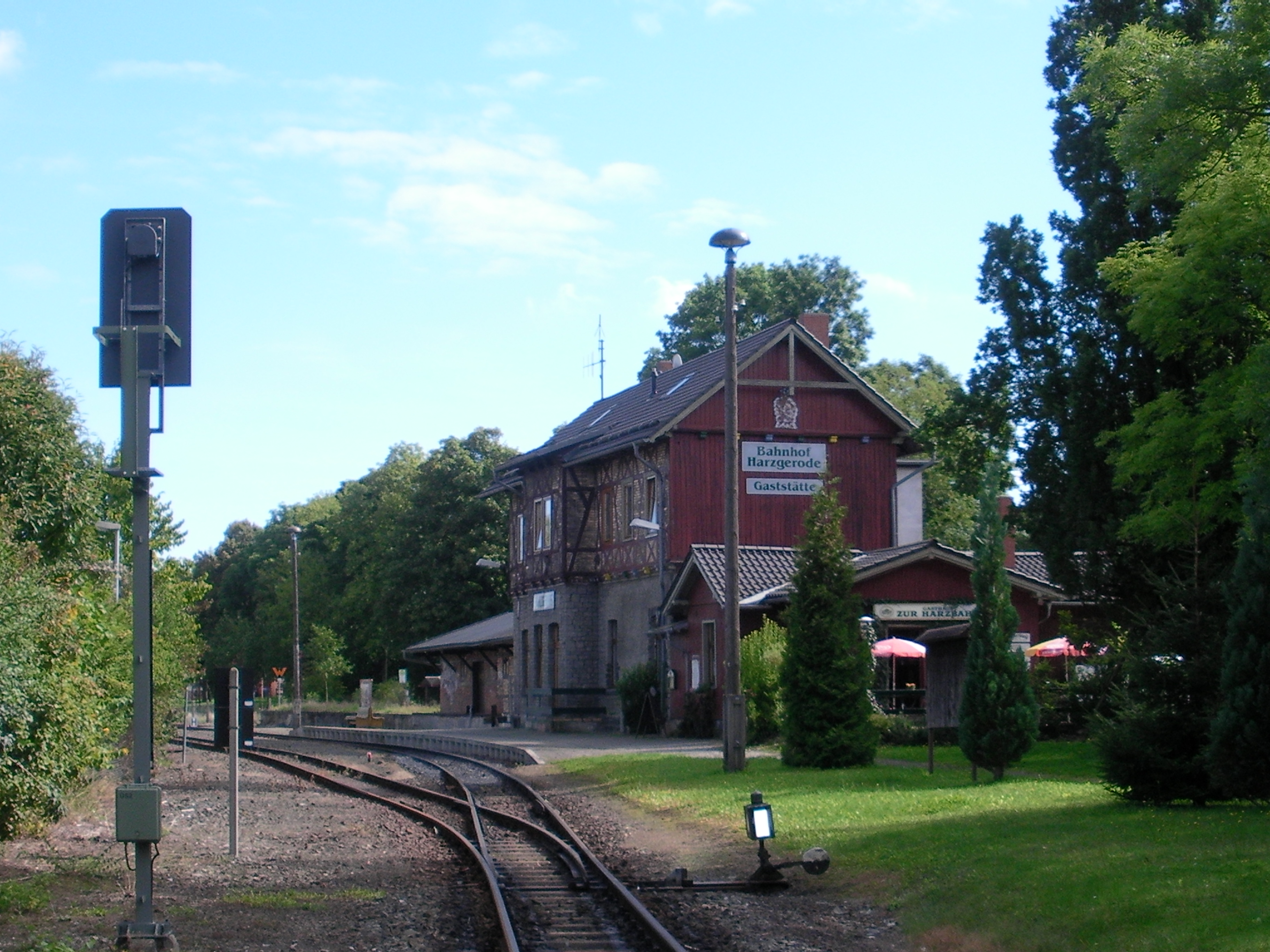
Harzgerode station

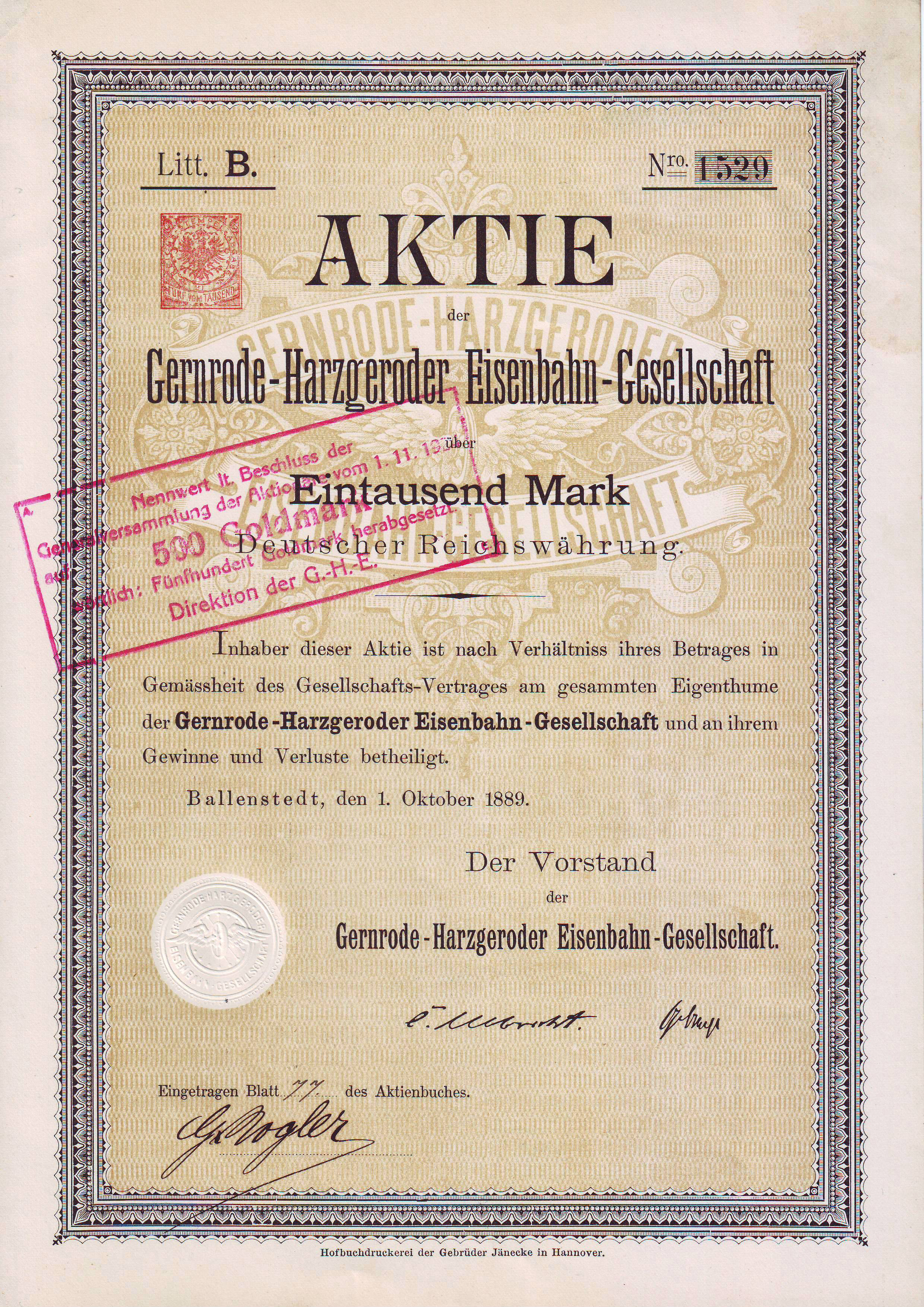
Share of the Gernrode-Harzgeroder Eisenbahn-Gesellschaft, issued 1. October 1889

The Gernrode-Harzgerode Railway Company (German: Gernrode-Harzgeroder Eisenbahn-Gesellschaft) or GHE was a private railway company in Germany that operated the Selke Valley Railway (the line from Gernrode via Hasselfelde and Alexisbad to Harzgerode and the line from Stiege to Eisfelder Talmühle). It had a junction with the network of the Nordhausen-Wernigerode Railway Company (NWE) at Eisfelder Talmühle station.

== History ==
The Gernrode-Harzgerode Railway Company was founded on 10 May 1886 with the aim of developing the East Harz by means of a small scale railway line. After the experience of the Felda Railway in Thuringia it was decided on cost grounds that a concession would be granted in March 1887 for a 1,000 mm (3 ft 3 3/8 in) metre gauge line from Gernrode to Harzgerode and Silberhütte. Gernrode had already had a railway connexion since 1885.

By 7 August 1887 the first section of the line, from Gernrode to Mägdesprung, was opened. Gradually the network was expanded until, on 15 July 1905, it reaches its farthest extent at Eisfelder Talmühle station. To counter the increase in motorised traffic in the 1930s, the GHE introduced new diesel railbuses (the GHE T 1) and its own bus routes.

From April to May 1945 operations of the GHE's lines ceased. In April 1946, all tracks were dismantled as war reparation payments to the Soviet Union, with the exceptions of the lines from Eisfelder Talmühle via Stiege to Hasselfelde and from Straßberg to the Flussspat mineshaft. From 15 April 1945, running powers were transferred to the NWE. The GHE was nationalised on 30 June 1946, together with its remaining installations and buildings.

In October 1946 work started on rebuilding the line from Gernrode to Harzgerode and Straßberg. It was completed in July 1949, but the GHE did not live to see it; on 1 April that year the line and its installations were transferred to the management of Deutsche Reichsbahn.

=== Bus services ===
In the 1920s, buses began to compete with the railway and, as a result, many railway companies started up their own bus routes. The GHE initially opened their first bus routes with the involvement of the East Harz Transport (Ostharzbahnen GmbH) on 24 February 1925. Because traffic on the routes developed favourably, not least because the timetables of buses and trains were harmonised with one another, the GHE bought more buses in the 1930s and took over the concession from the East Harz Transport in 1933 for more bus routes.

During the Second World War the GHE had to give up several buses and lorries that had been procured for the transportation of express goods, so that their motorised services had to be almost entirely withdrawn. After the end of the war in 1945 several of their commandeered vehicles were returned. In 1946, road and rail services were separated, the former continuing as an independent company.

== Running and rolling stock ==
Description	DR number	Preserved	Year of manufacture	Remarks
GHE – Selke to Hasselfelde (6 units)	99 5811	–	1887–1900	5 units transferred as reparations in 1946
GHE – Anhalt to Preußen (3 units)	–	–	1905	Went in 1914 to the Heeresfeldbahn
GHE 20	–	–	1910	Came in 1914 from RLK, transferred under reparations in 1946
GHE 21 and 22	–	–	1928	Transferred as reparations in 1946
GHE T 1	VT 137 522	187 001	1933	Railbus
NWE No. 1	99 5804	–	1896	Used as a hired locomotive (Mietlok) from 1946

== See also ==
- Harz Narrow Gauge Railways

== Literature ==
- Hans Röper; Gerhard Zieglgänsberger (1980), Die Selketalbahn (in German), Berlin: Transpress (Lizenzausgabe BRD: Alba), ISBN 3-87094-531-1 (Licensed edition)
- Manfred Bornemann (1981), Die Anhaltische Harzbahn (in German), Clausthal-Zellerfeld: H. Greinert
