= NWE T 1 to 3 =

NWE T 1 to T 3
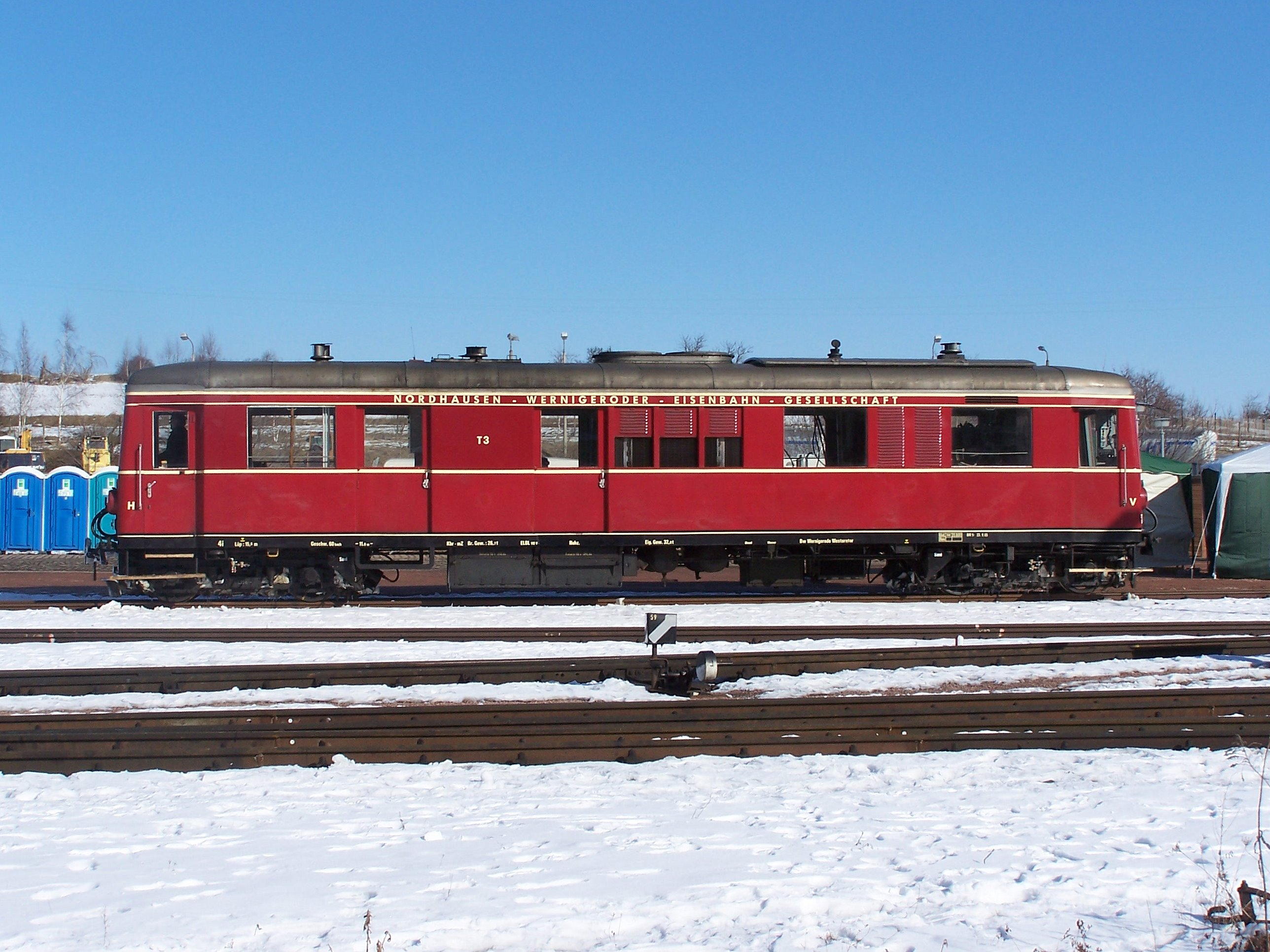
- HSB 187 025 in Gernrode in March 2006
- In service: 1939–1965
- Manufacturer: MAN (T 1); Waggonfabrik Wismar (mechanical); Brown, Boveri & Cie Mannheim (electrical)
- Constructed: 1939
- Number built: 3
- Number preserved: 1
- Number scrapped: 2
- Fleet numbers: NWE T 1 to T 3 DR VT 137 561, 565, 566; DR/HSB:187 025

Specifications
- Car length: 15,600 mm (51 ft 2 1/8 in) over buffers
- Height: 3,450 mm (11 ft 3 7/8 in)
- Wheel diameter: 800 mm (31 1/2 in)
- Maximum speed: 60 km/h (37 mph)
- Weight: 32.2 tonnes (31.7 long tons; 35.5 short tons)
- Engine type: Today: 6-cylinder turbo-diesel
- Power output: Today: 242 kW (329 PS; 325 hp)
- UIC classification: Bo′Bo′
- Minimum turning radius: 40 m (131 ft 2 3/4 in)
- Braking system(s): Compressed-air brake
- Track gauge: 1,000 mm (3 ft 3 3/8 in)

The four-axled, driving railcars NWE T 1 to 3 were intended to provide more cost-effective railway services for the Nordhausen-Wernigeroder Eisenbahn-Gesellschaft during times of low traffic demand. Only the T 1 had seats, the other two only a luggage compartment.

On their takeover by the Deutsche Reichsbahn in East Germany after the Second World War they were given the numbers VT 137 561, 565 and 566. Due to a shortage of spare parts, T 1 and 2 were scrapped around 1965 and only T 3, which is still preserved today, was given a computerised number, 187 025, by the DR in 1972. Since 1993 it has been in the possession of the Harzer Schmalspurbahnen (HSB) and was restored to working condition in 1999 after over 20 years in storage. Unlike the other HSB railcars, this one is painted uniformly in wine red and, with the exception of the 2007 programme, has been used exclusively for special services (during the inspections of the new railcars HSB 187 016 to 019).
