= Harz Narrow Gauge Railways =

German railway company

Harz Narrow Gauge Railways (Harzer Schmalspurbahnen GmbH)
- Company type: GmbH
- Industry: Railways
- Founded: 1 February 1993
- Headquarters: Wernigerode, Germany
- Key people: Matthias Wagener (CEO); Michael Ermrich (chairman of the supervisory board)
- Number of employees: 249 (2014-12-31)
- Website: www.hsb-wr.de

The Harz Narrow Gauge Railways (German: Harzer Schmalspurbahnen or HSB) is a railway company that operates a 1,000 mm (3 ft 3 3/8 in) metre gauge network in the Harz mountains, in central Germany (formerly East Germany). The company was formed after the fall of the Berlin Wall when the network, operated then by the Deutsche Reichsbahn, was privatised. It owns about 140 kilometres (87 miles)) of track, connecting the principal towns of Wernigerode, Nordhausen and Quedlinburg and several smaller settlements in the area. Much of the network is steeply graded and picturesque, but its most popular destination is the Brocken, the highest mountain in the region. The company runs a significant number of its trains with steam haulage, mostly employing 1950s vintage 2-10-2 tank locomotives, hauling traditional open-platform bogie carriages. The company is mainly owned by the various local authorities whose territories it serves.

== Forerunners ==
The present-day narrow gauge operator emerged as a result of the merger of two different railway companies that operated their own lines:

In 1887 the first narrow gauge line in the Harz, from Gernrode to Mägdesprung, was opened. It was owned by the Gernrode-Harzgerode Railway Company (Gernrode-Harzgeroder Eisenbahn-Gesellschaft) or GHE. In the years that followed, the line was extended and the network enlarged. The GHE network included the railway lines from Gernrode to Harzgerode, Hasselfelde and Eisfelder Talmühle. Because the line followed a section of the valley of the Selke, a small river, it was also nicknamed the Selke Valley Railway (Selketalbahn). Another pet name was the Anhalt Harz Railway (Anhaltische Harzbahn).

In 1896, a second railway company that wanted to build a narrow gauge railway through the Harz was entered into the commercial register. On 22 December 1898, the Nordhausen-Wernigerode Railway Company (Nordhausen-Wernigeroder Eisenbahn-Gesellschaft) or NWE opened special services on the line from Wernigerode to the Brocken (the Brocken Railway). The so-called Trans-Harz Railway (Harzquerbahn) from Wernigerode via Drei Annen Hohne to Nordhausen was fully opened to traffic on 27 March 1899.

After the Second World War, these lines fell within the Soviet Zone of Occupation, later East Germany and were taken over by the East German Deutsche Reichsbahn on 1 April 1949.

== The HSB period ==
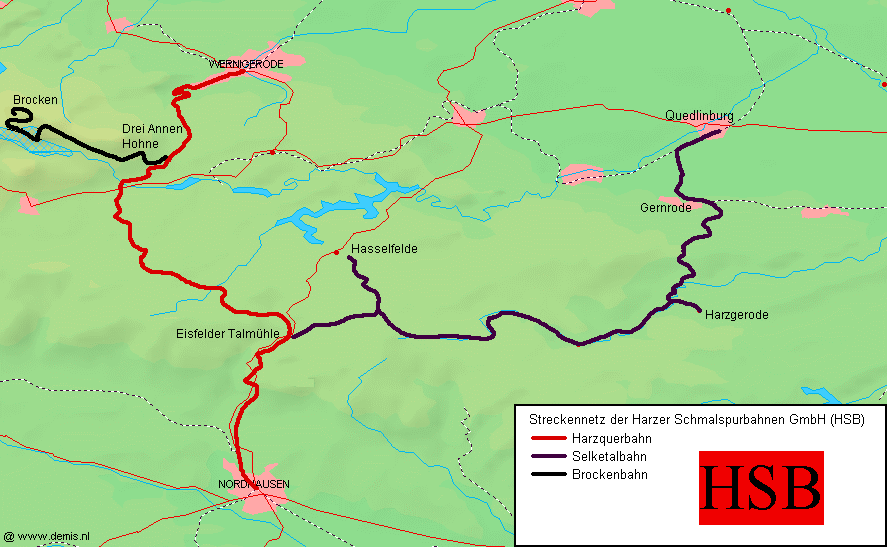
Map of HSB

On 1 February 1993 the private railway company Harzer Schmalspurbahnen GmbH (HSB) took over all stock, lines, staff, etc., from the Deutsche Reichsbahn and since then has acted as both the railway operating company (EVU) and railway infrastructure company (EIU). Shareholders in the HSB are the districts of Harz and Nordhausen, the communes along the railways, the town of Quedlinburg, the municipality of Tanne and the spa company of Braunlage. Its head office is in Wernigerode, where its workshops and locomotive depot are located. Today the HSB has the longest single network of narrow gauge railway in Germany, with a total length of 140.4 km (87.2 miles), 44 stations and halts.

Its trains run daily to a timetable and it operates more than ten steam locomotives, seven diesel railbuses and three trams (on the Nordhausen Tramway). All the lines are worked by steam trains, only in the winter timetable does the Stiege–Eisfelder Talmühle section of the Selke Valley Railway have no regular steam services due to its relatively low workload at that time of year.

The best-known line is the Brocken Railway which is worked by steam locomotive-hauled trains to a daily scheduled timetable running from Wernigerode via Drei Annen Hohne to the Brocken and back. Regional services between Nordhausen and Ilfeld, on the other hand were transferred to diesel railbuses and (since 1 May 2004) trams, apart from one steam train pair. In addition the HSB still operates regular goods trains from Hartsteinwerk Unterberg (on the Selke Valley Railway) to Nordhausen Übergabebahnhof (on the Trans-Harz Railway) using diesel locomotives of Class 199.8 and piggy-backed standard-gauge wagons.

On 1 May 2004 a link line was opened in Nordhausen between the Nordhausen Tramway and the Trans-Harz Railway. Since then, the above-mentioned tramway between Nordhausen Hospital and the HSB halt of Ilfeld-Neanderklinik (Line 10) has been worked by electric and hybrid vehicles of the Combino duo class. On the Trans-Harz Railway (which has no catenary), motive power is diesel-electric, the trams being equipped with an on-board diesel engine. As a result of the connecting track to the Nordhausen Tramway, the station of Nordhausen Nord, in particular, lost its significance. Apart from one pair of steam trains from Nordhausen and a few HSB railcars all trains since then have terminated at the tramway stop of Nordhausen Bahnhofsvorplatz.

On 18 April 2005, work started on the extension of the Selke Valley Railway from Gernrode to Quedlinburg (length 8.5 km) after DB AG had closed this standard-gauge section and sold it to the HSB. First, the Gernrode terminus was converted into a through station. On 4 March 2006, the first narrow gauge train Quedlinburg station and, since 26 June 2006, there have been scheduled services by the Harz narrow gauge railways to Quedlinburg with at least two pairs of steam trains per day. In Quedlinburg the HSB stops at a platform with trains of the Harz-Elbe Express to Halberstadt.

In 2009, with the support of the state of Saxony-Anhalt, the standard-gauge steam engine no. 95 1027 was overhauled at the Meiningen Steam Locomotive Works. It was used on the HSB and is now running museum railway services on the Rübeland Railway.

On 30 November 2009 construction was started in Nordhausen on a new halt (Schurzfell). This halt is intended to further improve access to the railway network for the population of Nordhausen. Building work continued until shortly before Christmas 2009 and was mainly carried out during the overnight pause so as not to interfere with services. The new halt was opened in time for the summer timetable in 2010.

In 2009 Lower Saxony tried to co-finance a connection of the town of Braunlage to the HSB network using an accumulation of capital from the economic stimulus package, Konjunktur II. (see also South Harz Railway). This initiative was shelved on 29 April 2010 due to the unacceptably high costs that were predicted.

== Rolling stock ==
The network is notable for its significant use of steam locomotives. This is primarily as a result of lack of investment during the period the line was in Deutsche Reichsbahn ownership, between 1945 and 1993. The mainstay of the steam locomotive fleet is a fleet of 17 2-10-2 tank locomotives, built during the 1950s (apart from the prototype), although several older types do remain, including four 0-4-4-0T mallet compound articulated locomotives. The steam locomotives are assisted by a fleet of diesel railcars which operate to a greater or lesser degree on most lines to supplement the steam services for the benefit of the local population.

Locomotives and railbuses	DR Class	Original designation	Built	Operational	Line(s) worked and where stabled	Remarks
Steam locomotives:
99 5901 to 5903	99^{590}	NWE 11 to 22	3	0	Wernigerode	Mallet locomotives
99 5906	99^{590}	NWE 41^{II}	1	0	Hasselfelde	Mallet locomotive
99 6001	99^{600}	NWE 21^{II}	1	1	Selke Valley Railway (Gernrode)	Einheitslok (prototype)
99 6101 and 6102	99^{610}	NWE 6 and 7	2	0	Nordhausen Nord/Gernrode	Superheated/wet steam engines
99 7222	99^{22}	99 222	1	1	Harz and Brocken Railway (Wernigerode)	Einheitslok, nickname Big Mama, mostly runs under its old number
99 7231 to 7247	99^{23–24}	99 231 to 247	21	9	Harz and Brocken Railway	Neubaudampfloks
Diesel railbuses:
187 001	VT 137	GHE T 1	1	0	Wernigerode Westerntor	Specials
187 011 and 013	–	KAE VT 1 and 2	2	0	Wernigerode Westerntor	Nickname Fischstäbchen, reserve vehicle
187 012	–	MEG T 15	1	1	Selke Valley Railway (Gernrode)	
187 015	–	–	1	0	Wernigerode Westerntor	Neubau railbus prototype
187 016 to 019	–	–	4	4	Harz and Selke Valley Railway (3 Nordhausen Nord, 1 Wernigerode)	Neubau railbus
187 025	VT 137	NWE T 3	1	1	All lines (Wernigerode Westerntor)	Specials, Trailer car
187 201 to 203			3	3	Tram line 10 in the Nordhausen region	Dual system tram power cars Type Combino duo of the SWN
Diesel locomotives:
199 005 and 006		V 10 C	2	0	(Nordhausen Nord)	On long-term loan to the Friends of the HSG (IG Harzer Schmalspurbahnen), 006 awaiting repair
199 010 to 012		Kö II	3	1	Shunting services Bw Wernigerode Westerntor	Converted from standard gauge
199 301		V 30 C	1	0	(Ilfeld loco shed)	Metre-gauge prototype for locomotive series for the Indonesian State Railways
199 861 ... 892		V 100	6	3	All lines hauling works trains, the breakdown train, goods trains and in shunting and snow-clearance duties (Wernigerode, 2 Nordhausen Nord)	Converted from standard gauge, Nickname Harzkamel
Standard-gauge steam locomotives:
95 1027	95^{0}	95 027	1	1	Rübeland Railway (Blankenburg (Harz))	Deployed by the HSB, operates on the standard-gauge Rübeland Railway

== See also ==
- Brocken Railway
- Trans-Harz Railway
- Selke Valley Railway
- South Harz Railway
