= Eisfelder Talmühle station =

Railway station in Harztor, Germany

Coordinates: 51°37′14″N 10°48′48″E

Eisfelder Talmühle
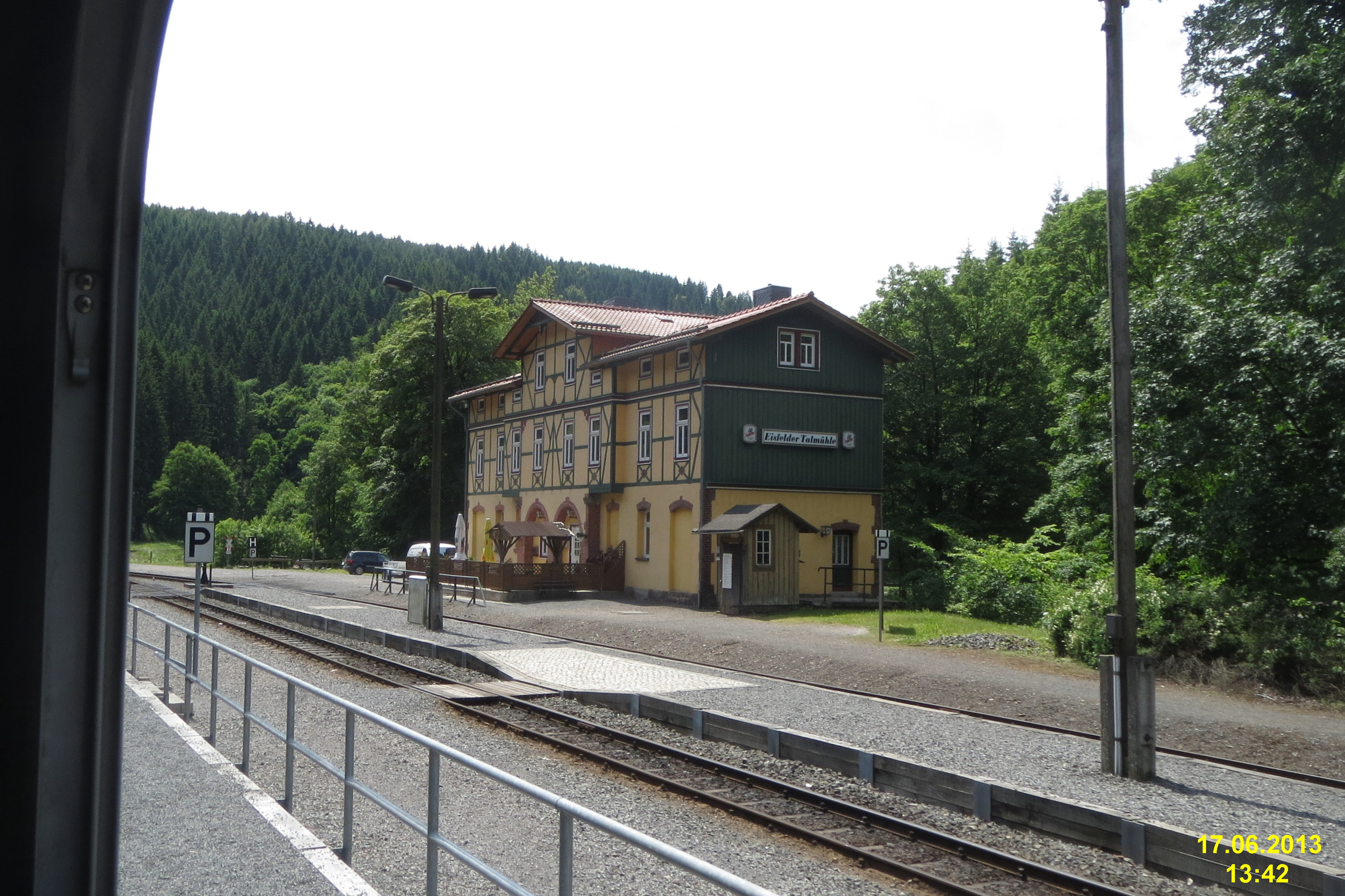
- 2013

General information
- Location: Bahnhof Eisfelder Talmühle; 99768 Harztor; Thuringia; Germany
- Elevation: 352 m (1,155 ft)
- System: Bf
- Owner: HSB
- Operator: HSB
- Lines: Harz Railway (KBS 326); Selke Valley Railway (KBS 333)
- Platforms: 1 island platform 1 side platform
- Tracks: 3
- Train operators: HSB

Other information
- Station code: -
- DS100 code: LETM
- IBNR: 8017007
- Category: -

History
- Opened: 15 September 1898; 127 years ago

Services
Preceding station	Harzer Schmalspurbahnen	Following station
Netzkater towards Nordhausen Nord	Harzquerbahn	Tiefenbachmühle towards Drei Annen Hohne
Terminus	Selketalbahn	Birkenmoor towards Quedlinburg
Location
- Location within Thuringia Location within Germany Location within Europe

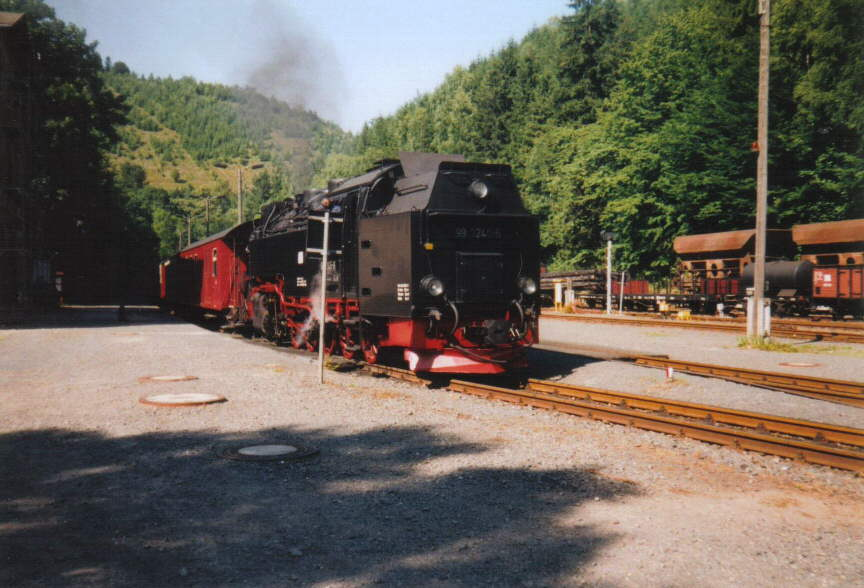
Steam train in Eisfelder Talmühle

Eisfelder Talmühle station (German: Bahnhof Eisfelder Talmühle) is an isolated junction station between the Selketalbahn and the Harz narrow gauge mainline (Harzquerbahn). In the days of East Germany's Deutsche Reichsbahn it had large refreshment rooms and staff. It is still however a busy interchange at certain times of the day when steam trains and railcars converge from three directions to allow passengers to make connections.
