= Kuhn slide =

Steam locomotive valve gear component

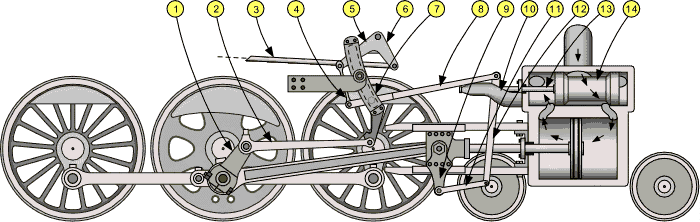
Classic Walschaerts valve gear with lifting link: 4. Lifting link 5. Lifting arm 7. Expansion link 8. Radius rod

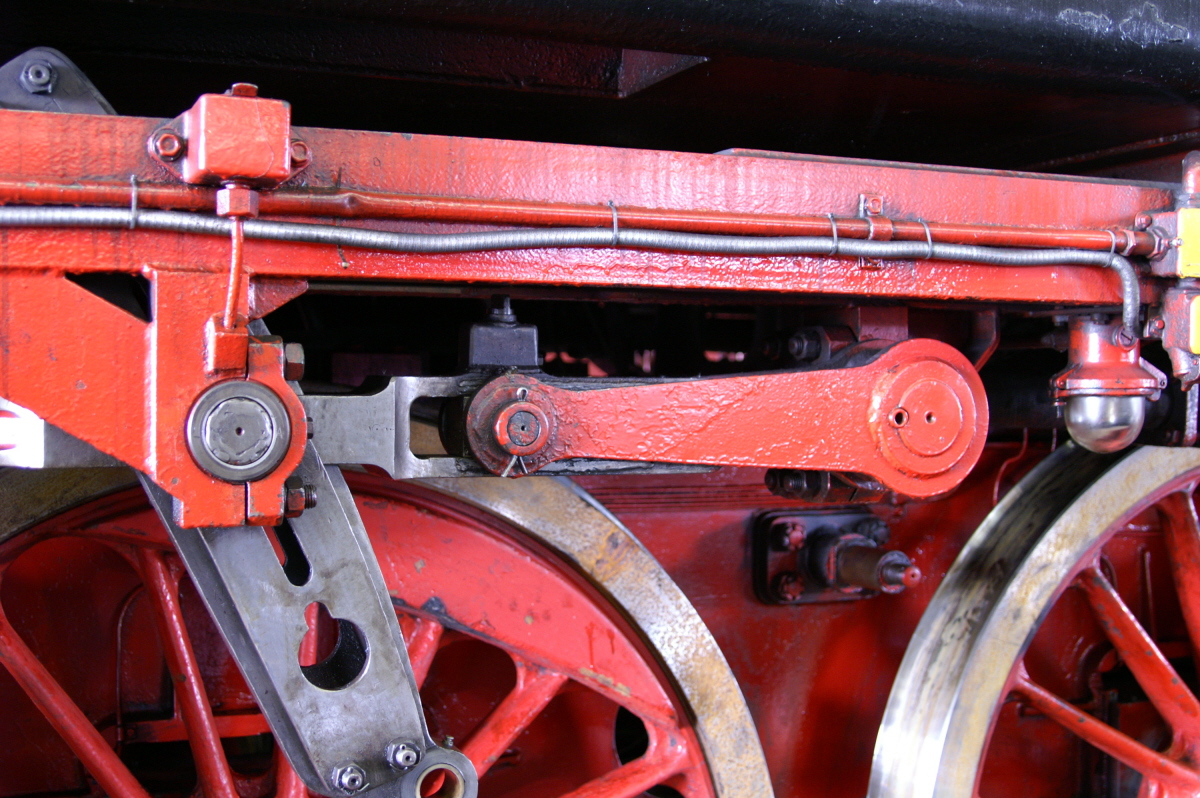
Kuhn slide on a Deutsche Reichsbahn DR Class 65.10 Neubaulok

The Kuhn slide (German: Kuhnsche Schleife) is part of a modified Walschaerts (German: Heusinger) valve gear on steam locomotives and is named after its inventor, Michael Kuhn (1851–1903). The term is also used to refer to this particular type of Walschaerts valve gear system as a whole.

== Overview ==
Problems often arise in incorporating a Walschaerts valve gear into the design of tank and narrow gauge locomotives because of space limitations. The reversing rod (with its lifting arm), needed to change between forward and reverse running, is therefore mounted at the same level as the pivot of the expansion link. This enables the lifting link (German: Hängeeisen) to be dispensed with, and the lifting arm to be connected directly to the radius rod. To ensure the required horizontal movement, the back end of the radius rod is designed as a slide (the 'Kuhn slide') which fits into a rotatable crosshead (Gleitstein) in the lifting arm.

== Advantages ==
The Kuhn valve gear was not as widespread as the classic Walschaerts valve gear as its production costs were higher. One advantage of the Kuhn slide is that it runs equally smoothly in either direction. For that reason it was preferred on tank locomotives which, for operational reasons, often had to run backwards for long periods.

One locomotive that benefited was the Prussian P 8. After the first 250 were built, the valve gear was changed and the Kuhn slide was added. Together with larger counterweights on the driving wheels, this improved the locomotive's running characteristics.

== Variations ==
A variation of the Kuhn slide was developed by the Winterthur Locomotive Works. On the so-called Winterthur valve gear the expansion link itself is attached to the reversing shaft, both having a common pivot.
