= Counterweight brake =

Early form of hand brake on certain types of railway vehicles

A counterweight brake (German: Wurfhebelbremse) is an early form of hand brake on railway tenders and tank locomotives.

By throwing a counterweight lever, play in the brake blocks is quickly taken up and braking action is initiated. Further movement of the lever increases the transmission so that the blocks are pressed against the wheel tyres with greater and greater force.

On locomotive tenders the counterweight brake generally acts on all the axles, whilst on tank engines the braking action is only applied to the driving and coupled wheels.

== See also ==
- Emergency brake (train)
- Exter counterweight brake

== Literature ==
- Lexikon Eisenbahn, Transpress Verlag für Verkehrswesen, Berlin, 1978
