= Balance lever coupling =

Train buffer with couplings

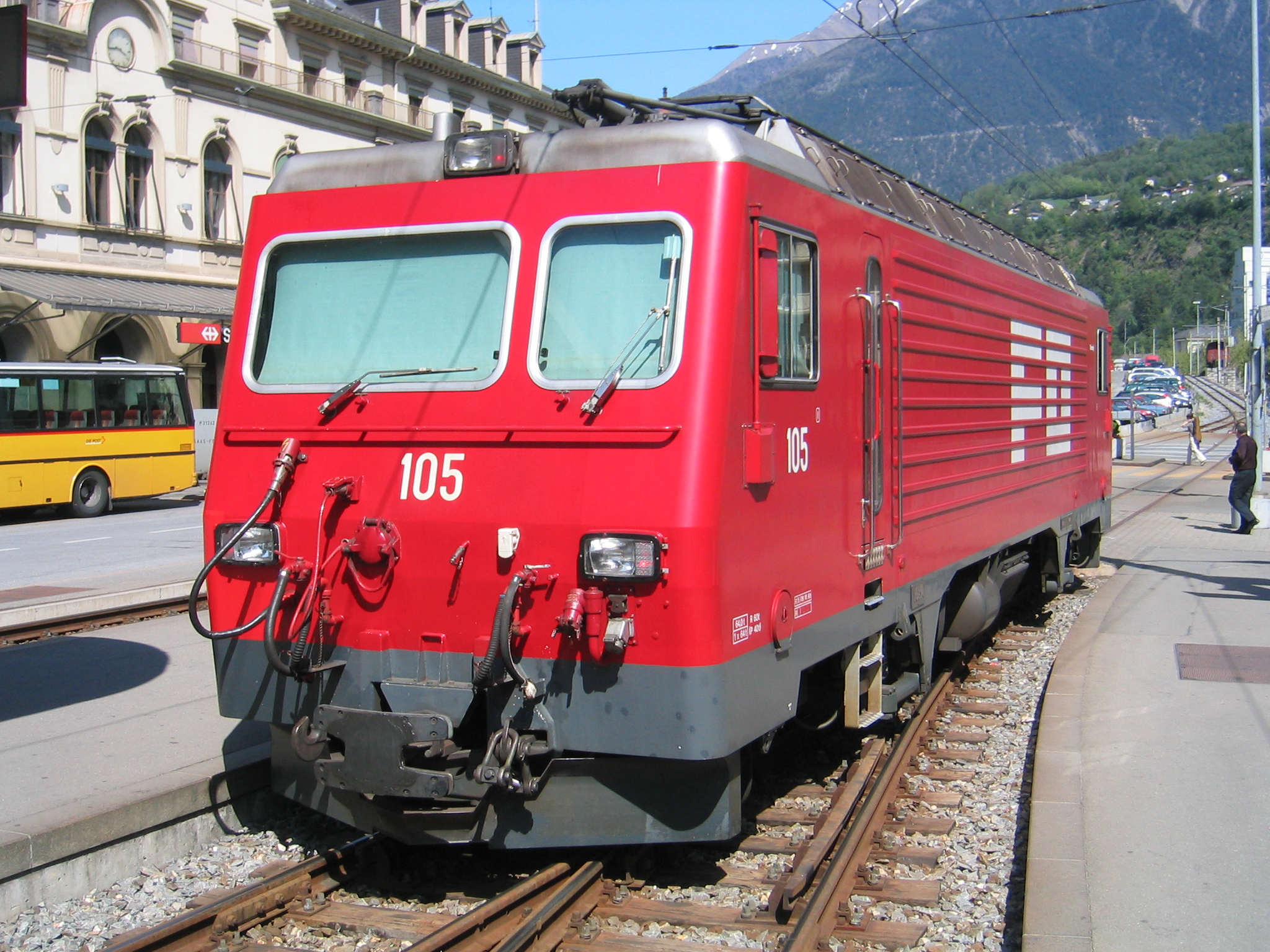
Electric locomotive of the Furka-Oberalp-Bahn (today MGB) with balancing lever coupling

The balance lever coupling, also known as rocking lever coupling or compensating coupling, is a type of central buffer coupling that has found widespread use, especially in narrow-gauge railways. In Switzerland this type of coupling is called a central buffer with two screw couplings, abbreviated to Zp2, or referred to as a central buffer coupling with coupling hooks on the side.

== Description ==
The UIC standard coupling is not suitable for narrow gauge railways with their often tight curve radii. By exchanging the tension and compression devices, the standard screw coupling used on standard gauge railroads became the central buffer coupling with screw coupling on the side connected to a balance lever

The balance lever coupling has a movable balance lever mounted transversely behind the buffer, to which a draw hook is attached on the left side of the center buffer and an eye with a screw coupling on the right side. In the center of the screw coupling is a screw with a left-hand thread on one side and a right-hand thread on the other. To connect, the screw coupling of each vehicle is hooked into the hook of the other coupler. The screws in the screw couplers are then tightened with the ball handle attached to them. The turnbuckle-style arrangement pulls the vehicles together so that a preload is applied to the center buffers of the couplers, providing a smooth, jerk-free ride. The couplers' balance levers distribute the load evenly between the two screw couplers. The balance levers may be located in front of or behind the buffer beams, in which case the hook and eye for holding the screw coupling pass through recesses in the buffer beam.

In the case of simple designs, the screw is partly replaced by a triangular isosceles chain link. This chain link has side lengths of different lengths, so the length of the coupling chain for separating or tensioning the train can be varied by simply turning the chain link.

With the introduction of transporter wagons, the balancing lever coupling was combined with the funnel coupling on most of the narrow-gauge railways in order to be able to couple the rolling carriage by means of a dome boom. An additional auxiliary coupling for coupling the trolleys is common on Polish narrow-gauge railways. On the Rhaetian Railway, the roller bogies (roller carriages) are equipped with normal couplings; if necessary, flat wagons can be lined up as barrier vehicles in between.

=== Gallery ===
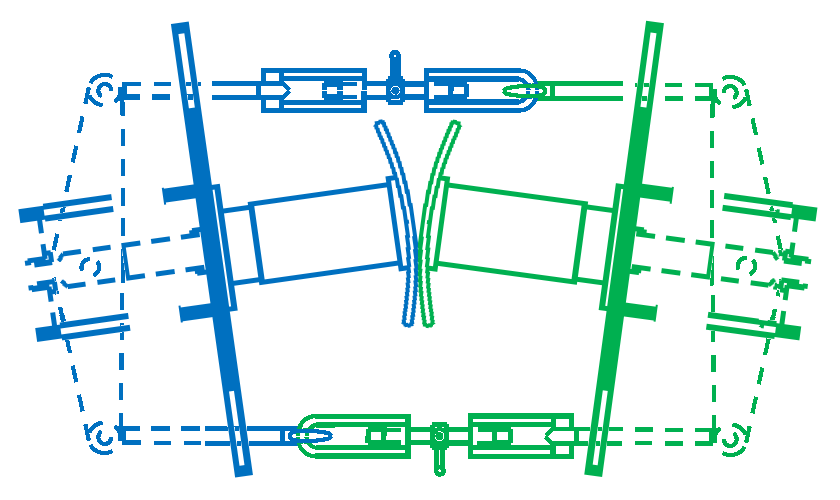
Balancing lever coupling on a tight curve

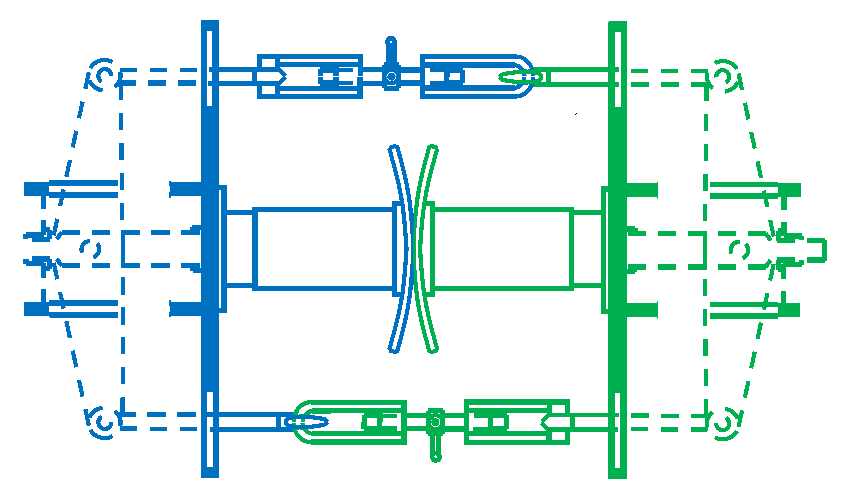
Balancing lever coupling or central buffer with two screw couplings (Zp 2)

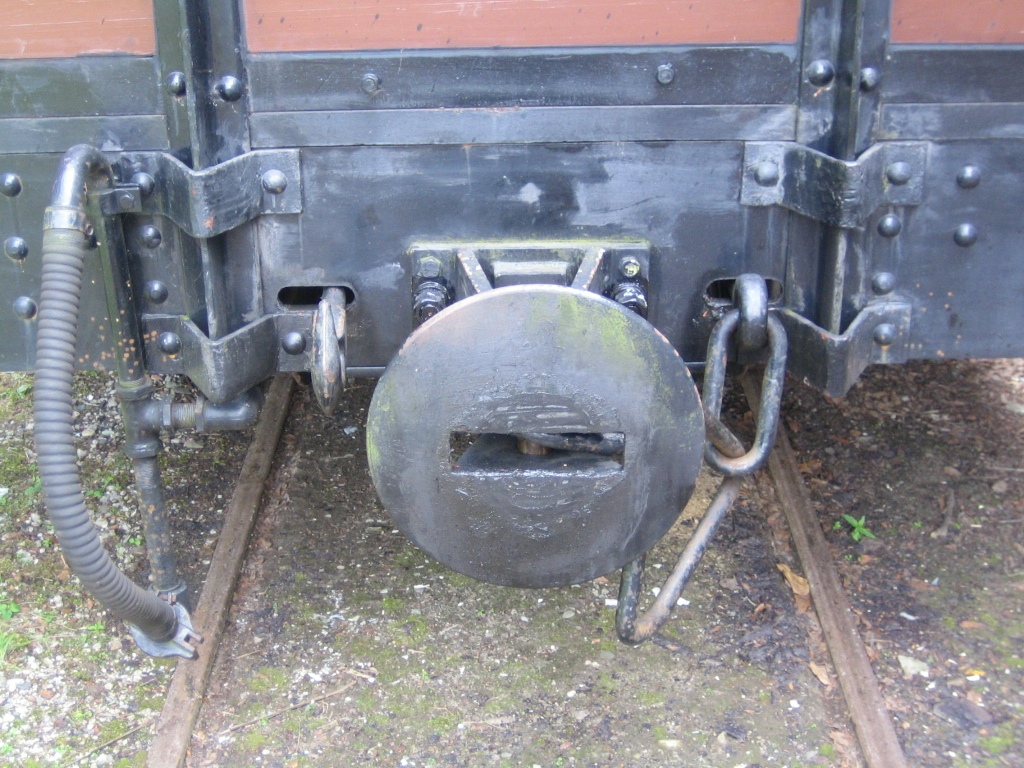
Balancing lever behind the buffer beam

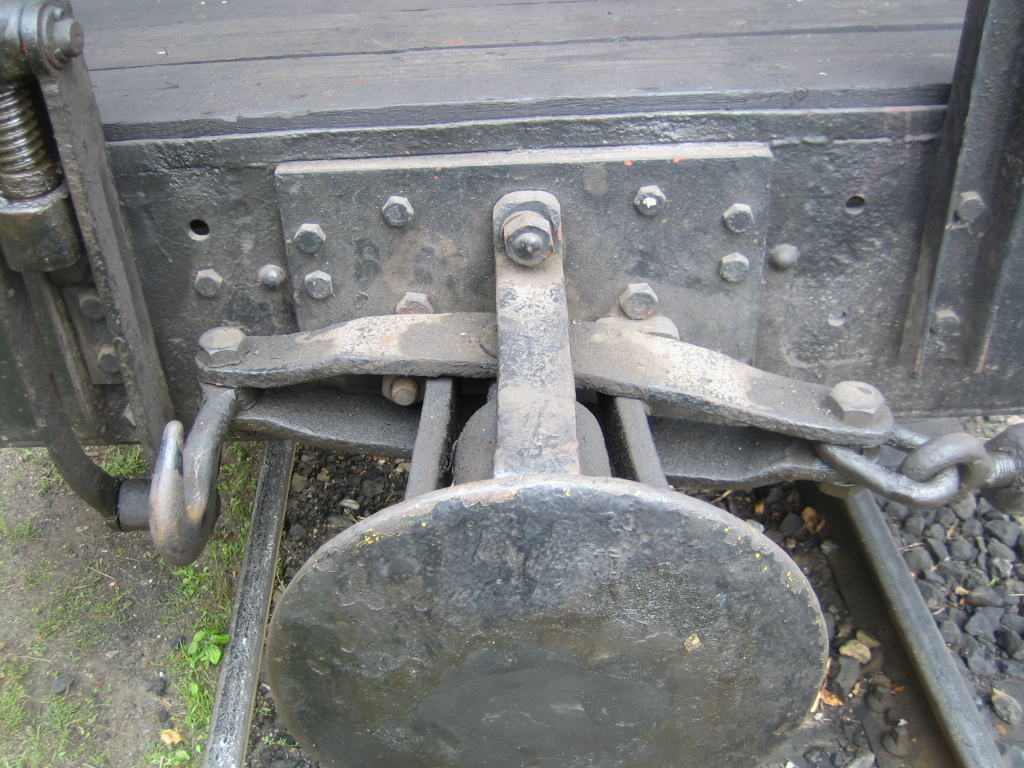
Balancing lever in front of the buffer beam

== Diagramme of coupling types in Switzerland ==
In Switzerland, the center buffer couplings are only referred to as manually operated couplings, but not as automatic couplings. Two types are used.

Center coupling
Center buffer with two screw couplers (Zp2)	Center buffer with one screw coupler (Zp1)

== Usage ==
Examples of the use of the balance lever coupling today are:

=== In Switzerland ===
- Matterhorn Gotthard Bahn (MGB)
- Rhaetian Railway (RhB)
- Yverdon–Ste-Croix railway
- Le Locle–Les Brenets line
- Regional Bus and Rail Company of Ticino (FART) older vehicles

=== Outside Switzerland ===
- Harz Narrow Gauge Railways (HSB)
- Rügen narrow-gauge railway (RüKB)
- Diakopto–Kalavryta railway - Kalavryta (SPAP-ΣΠΑΠ)

== See also ==
- Center-buffer-and-chains
