= Renfe Class 252 =

Class of Spanish electric locomotive

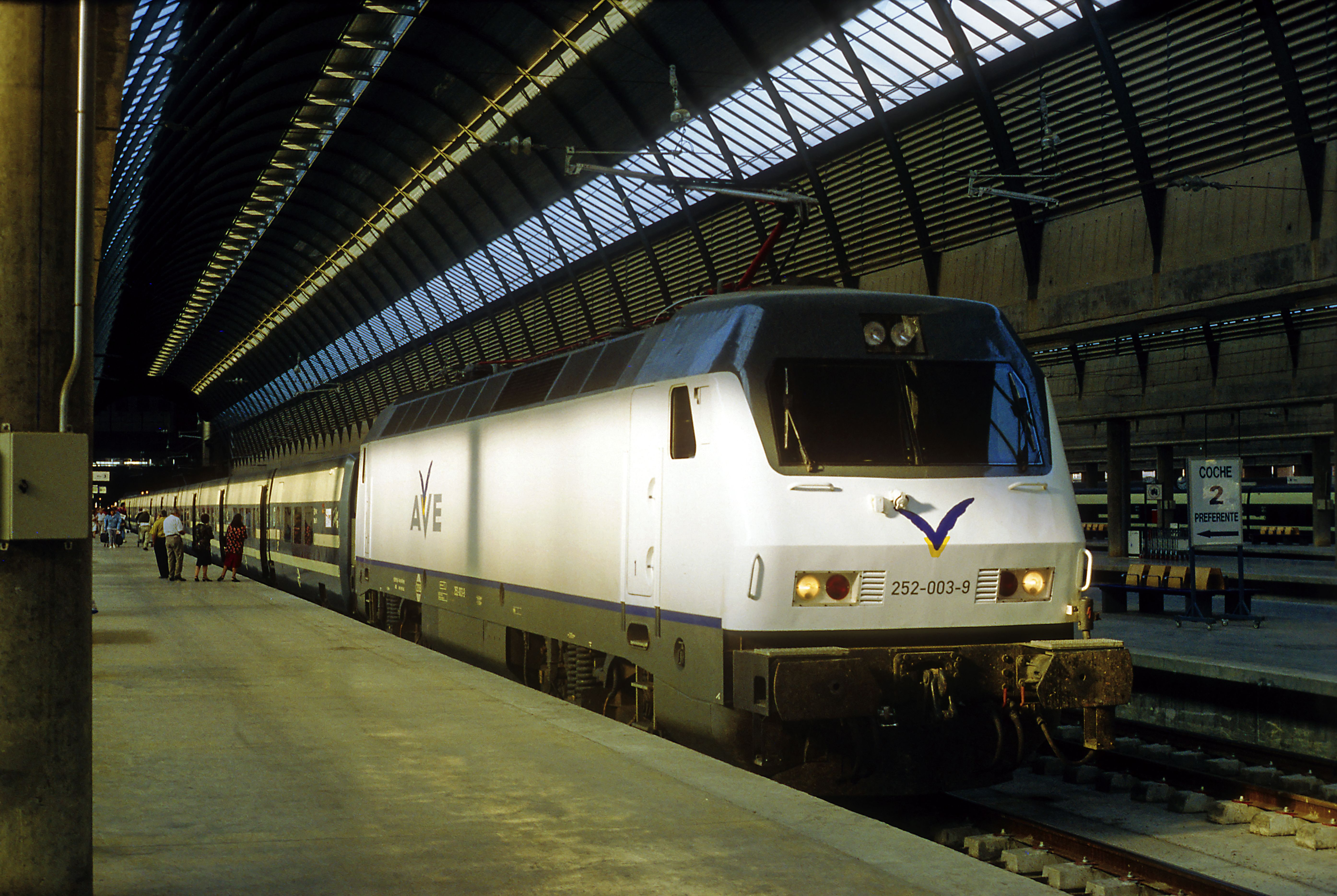
- Standard gauge class 252 in AVE livery
Type and origin
- Power type: Electric
- Builder: Iberian gauge: CAF, Macosa; Standard gauge: Siemens and Krauss-Maffei
- Build date: 1991–1996
- Total produced: Total of 75; 60 to Iberian gauge 15 to standard gauge
Specifications
- Gauge: 1,668 mm (5 ft 5 21/32 in) gauge 1,435 mm (4 ft 8 1/2 in) gauge
- Wheelbase: 3.00 m (118.11 in), bogie centre distance 10.50 m (34 ft 5.4 in)
- Length: 20.38 m (66 ft 10.4 in) over buffers
- Width: 3.00 m (9 ft 10.11 in)
- Height: 4.3 m (14 ft 1.29 in)
- Loco weight: 90 tonnes (89 long tons; 99 short tons) (dual voltage); 86 tonnes (85 long tons; 95 short tons) single voltage
- Electric system/s: Catenary; 3 kV DC and 25 kV 50 Hz AC; Since 2010: 4 locomotives also 1.5 kV DC
- Current pickup: Pantograph
- Traction motors: 4 three phase TB 2824-OGA02 @ 1.438 MW (1,928 hp)
- Safety systems: ASFA, LZB
Performance figures
- Maximum speed: 200 km/h (120 mph) commercial, 220 km/h (140 mph) approved 302 km/h (188 mph) in testing on the LAV Madrid - Sevilla
- Power output: 5,600 kW (7,500 hp)

The Renfe Class 252 are a series of Bo'Bo' electric locomotives, built by CAF, Meinfesa, Siemens and Krauss-Maffei for Renfe. 15 units were built for the AVE Madrid–Seville high speed line in (standard gauge version), and 60 units constructed for general use to Iberian gauge (1668mm).

== Background, design, construction and history ==
The series of locomotives were ordered to modernise Renfe's fleet and to provide traction on the new standard gauge Madrid to Seville line, on Iberian gauge lines they were to replace RENFE Classes 276, 277 and 278 which were of some age, and incapable of speeds of 200 km/h; the order coincided with the construction of the first standard gauge high speed line in Spain, and was won in 1989 by a consortium of Swiss and German companies led by Siemens including Krauss-Maffei, Thyssen-Henschel and ABB.

The locomotives design was a development of that used in DB Class 120, which eventually led to the Siemen's EuroSprinter family of locomotives; of which the Class 252 can be considered a predecessor. The first 15 locomotives were built to 1,435 mm (4 ft 8 1/2 in) gauge in Germany, a further 60 locomotives were manufactured to 1,668 mm (5 ft 5 21/32 in) gauge by CAF and Meinfesa in Spain.

31 locomotives were dual voltage machines operating on 3 kV DC and 25 kV AC, the remaining 44 operated on 3 kV DC only. Subsequent to their introduction some of the locomotives have been re-bogied to both standard and Iberian gauge to meet operational requirements.

Locomotives built for the standard gauge high speed lines carried a white/grey 'AVE' livery, whilst the Iberian gauge machines were delivered in 'Taxi'/'Amarillo' (Yellow/Grey) livery, later some carried 'Arco' and 'Altaria' branding. In 2005 all locomotives became part of Renfe. These locomotives can be seen today throughout the Spanish territory of electrified railway lines.

In 1995, 252 054 was seriously damaged in an accident in El Paso Despeñaperros, being scrapped later in Villaverde Bajo. In 2003, 252 062 was involved in an accident in Zuera and scrapped.

In 2010, four locomotives were modified for freight work on standard gauge lines from Barcelona to Le Soler (nr. Perpignan) in France. The vehicles were fitted with ERTMS compatible train safety devices, standard gauge bogies; they will also operated from 1.5 kV DC on some sections of the route.

== See also ==
- EuroSprinter
- CP Class 5600 similar locomotives built at the same time for the Portuguese railways, operating only on 25 kV AC
- OSE Class 120 similar locomotives build by KraussMaffei-Siemens for Hellenic Railways Organization in 1997–2005, Operating on 25 kV 50 Hz AC
