= DR Class 252 =

German electric locomotive class

252 (until 1992) 156 (from 1992) MEG 801–804
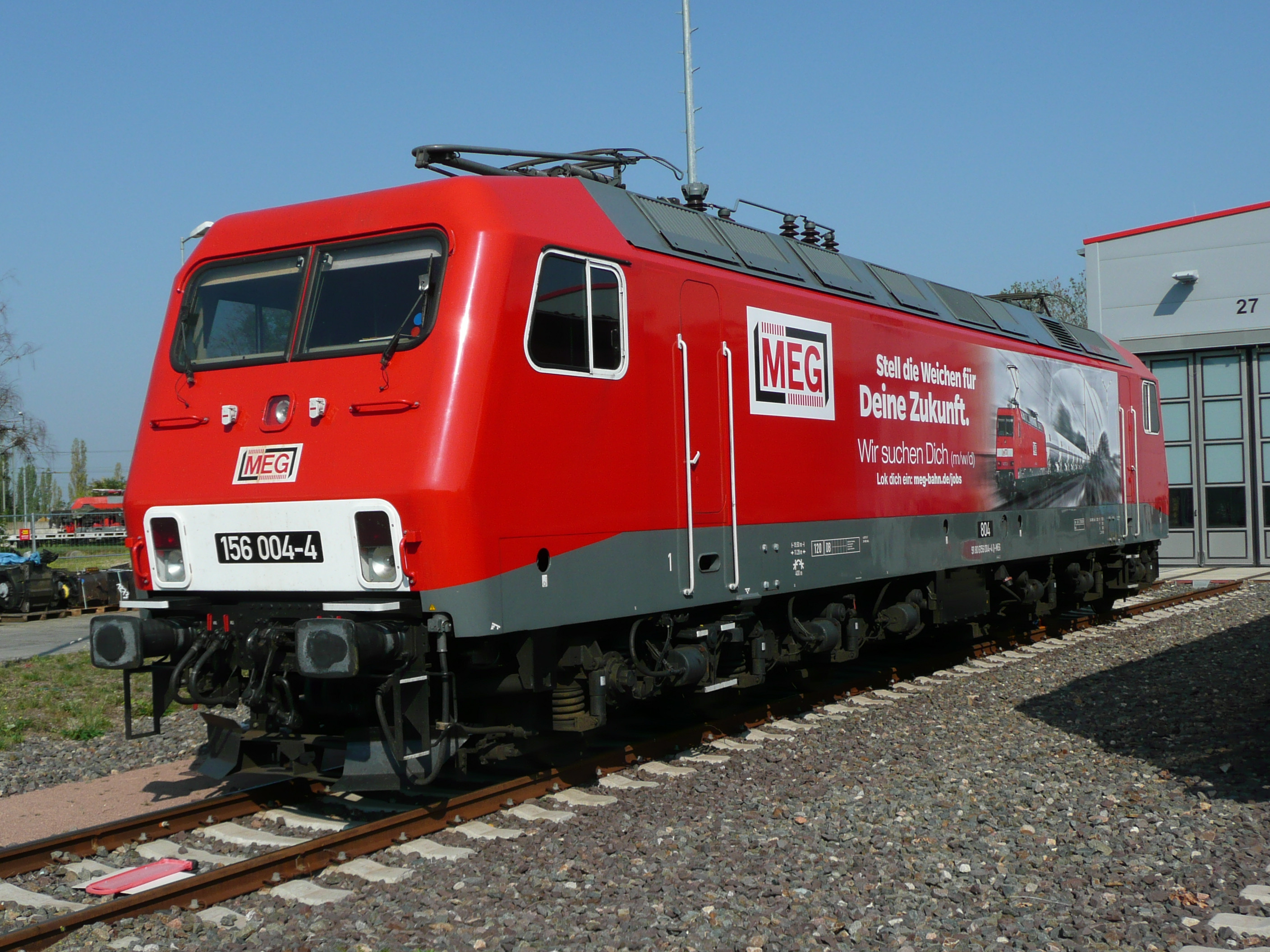
- MEG locomotive 804 in the Dessau depot
Type and origin
- Builder: LEW / AEG
- Build date: 1991
- Total produced: 4
Specifications
- Configuration
  - UIC: Co'Co'
- Gauge: 1435 mm
- Driver dia.: 1250 mm (new) resp. 1160 mm (worn)
- Minimum curve: 140 m
- Wheelbase
  - Overall: 14 660 mm
- Pivot centres: 11 290 mm
- Length
  - Over beams: 19 500 mm
- Width: 3100 mm
- Height: 4650 mm (Lowered pantograph)
- Axle load: 20,0 t
- Service weight: 120,0 t
- Electric system/s: 15 kV, 16,7 Hz AC
- Current pickup: Overhead lines
- Traction motors: 6 × VEM Sachsenwerk ECFB 1110-127C
- Transmission: LEW-Kegelringfeder
- Loco brake: Air brake and electric resistance brake
- Auxiliary brake: Non-automatic auxiliary air brake
- Parking brake: Mechanical parking brake
- Safety systems: PZ80, PZB 90
Performance figures
- Maximum speed: 125 km/h
- Power output
  - 1 hour: 5880 kW
  - Continuous: 5580 kW
- Power index: 49,0 kW/t
- Tractive effort
  - Starting: 361 kN
Career
- Numbers: DR 252 001–004; DB 156 001–004; MEG 801–804
- Retired: 2002 (DB); 2020–2021 (MEG)

The DR Class 252 (after 1992: DB 156) was the last new development of an electric locomotive for the Deutsche Reichsbahn. It was intended as a supplement to the Class 250, and in further series as a successor to the Class 251 locomotives on the Rübelandbahn (electrified with 25 kV 50 Hz) and as a locomotive for transit traffic with a maximum speed of 160 km/h, which was to be used on the West Berlin-Hannover main line via Berlin-Staaken-Oebisfelde, which was to be expanded.

However, the last two projects were never realized. As there was no longer any need for these locomotives with conventional AC technology after the reunification of Germany due to the rapid decline in freight traffic, the order for the first delivery series of 70 locomotives, which had already been completed, was canceled. A total of 350 units were planned to be procured in several delivery series by 1995.

== History ==
=== Background ===
In 1955, the Deutsche Reichsbahn was able to resume electric train operations after locomotives and equipment, which had to be handed over to the Soviet Union as reparations after the end of the war, were bought back. By 1970, many kilometers of track had been electrified, particularly in Saxony, increasing the proportion of electrified lines in relation to the overall network to eight percent by 1970 (in comparison: 29 percent for the Deutsche Bundesbahn). Thereafter, due to the considerable technical effort required for line electrification, the lack of construction and material capacities and the lack of power station capacities, the use of diesel locomotives was prioritized. However, the oil crisis at the beginning of the 1980s forced a rethink and the expansion of the electrified network was pushed forward again. The many kilometers of track electrified in just a few years resulted in a very high demand for additional electric locomotives. By the end of the 1980s, many new-build locomotives were already in service with the DR. Heavy goods traffic was dominated by the 250 series locomotives, which were also used in heavy express train services. From 1984, the universally deployable class 243 was also delivered. Together with the 211 and 242 classes, which had been in service since the 1960s, these two series were the most important representatives of electric locomotives on the Deutsche Reichsbahn. Due to the constantly increasing train loads, the latter often required uneconomical pre-tensioning power, especially as the multiple control system, with which only a small number of the locomotives had been supplied anyway, was removed again as early as the mid-1970s.

Although over 500 new class 243 locomotives had already been delivered between 1984 and the end of 1989, it was still not possible to completely dispense with the pre-war class 244 and 254 locomotives, some of which had already been in service for over 50 years and had often reached the wear limits.

There were also plans to replace the class 251 locomotives on the Rübelandbahn, which was electrified with 25 kV at 50 Hz, with more modern successors. There were also plans to electrify the approach line from Halle and to convert electric operation on the Rübelandbahn to the usual 15 kV at 16.7 Hz.

In addition, talks between the GDR and the Federal Republic of Germany began in 1987 with the aim of significantly accelerating rail transit traffic between the FRG and West Berlin, with the electrification and upgrading of the Berlin-Hanover line for speeds of up to 160 km/h being planned. The DR planned to procure locomotives for 160 km/h for this purpose.

After a specification sheet for the new series had been drawn up, the DR initially ordered four prototypes from VEB Lokomotivbau Elektrotechnische Werke, which were manufactured at the Hennigsdorf plant (near Berlin). These locomotives were given the series designation 252.

=== Testing and presentation of the prototypes ===
The 252 004 was transferred to Leipzig on 10 March 1991 by the 243 001 and a measuring car and presented to the public for the first time at the Leipzig Trade Fair. Further presentations took place a short time later at an exhibition in Berlin-Wannsee. On 5 July 1991, the 252 001 was presented at the Wustermark depot.

Extensive testing took place in the Halle (Saale) area and later in the Berlin area. After a brake inspection of the 252 002 was carried out on 29 November 1991, it was used in front of scheduled trains and these assignments were used for personnel training. At the beginning of March 1992, the four locomotives were assigned to the Friedrichstadt section of the Dresden depot. At the same time, further trials were carried out, including in front of heavy coal trains.

In March 1993, 156 004, which had already been designated according to the new joint DR and DB scheme, was a guest at the DR's Central Office for Machine Technology in Halle (Saale) for trials, while 156 002 completed some test runs at the Bundesbahn Central Offices in Minden. Meanwhile, the other two locomotives were parked in Dresden-Friedrichstadt due to minor damage.

=== Reasons for not procuring a series ===
At this time, the Deutsche Bundesbahn had already gained experience with series-built three-phase locomotives with the 120 series, which were considered to be significantly more economical and whose brushless traction motors offered clear maintenance advantages. In contrast, the class 156 locomotives were still conventional single-phase locomotives with series-wound motors. In this respect, there was little interest in a completely newly developed AC locomotive after German reunification. Accelerated by the reunification of Germany, the plans to upgrade the conventional Berlin-Hanover railroad line were abandoned in favor of the construction of a new high-speed line for speeds > 200 km/h. The procurement of a variant of the class 252 for 160 km/h for the Berlin-Hanover line had thus become obsolete.

The newly founded Deutsche Bahn (DB) now had to weigh up the advantages and disadvantages of the 112 and 156 series, which were due for series production. DB no longer wanted to procure six-axle locomotives, as these entailed significantly higher production and maintenance costs than the four-axle locomotives that were now favored. Furthermore, the sharp decline in freight traffic after reunification meant that there was no longer any need for pure heavy freight locomotives. On the other hand, the fact that it was a passenger locomotive that had already been developed by the DR but not yet ordered for series production spoke in favor of ordering the class 112. As there was an increased demand for passenger locomotives with a top speed of 160 km/h, the decision was made in favour of series production of the class 112. The four class 156 locomotives that had already been produced therefore remained individual units.

=== Use ===
==== Use by DR and Deutsche Bahn until 1998 ====
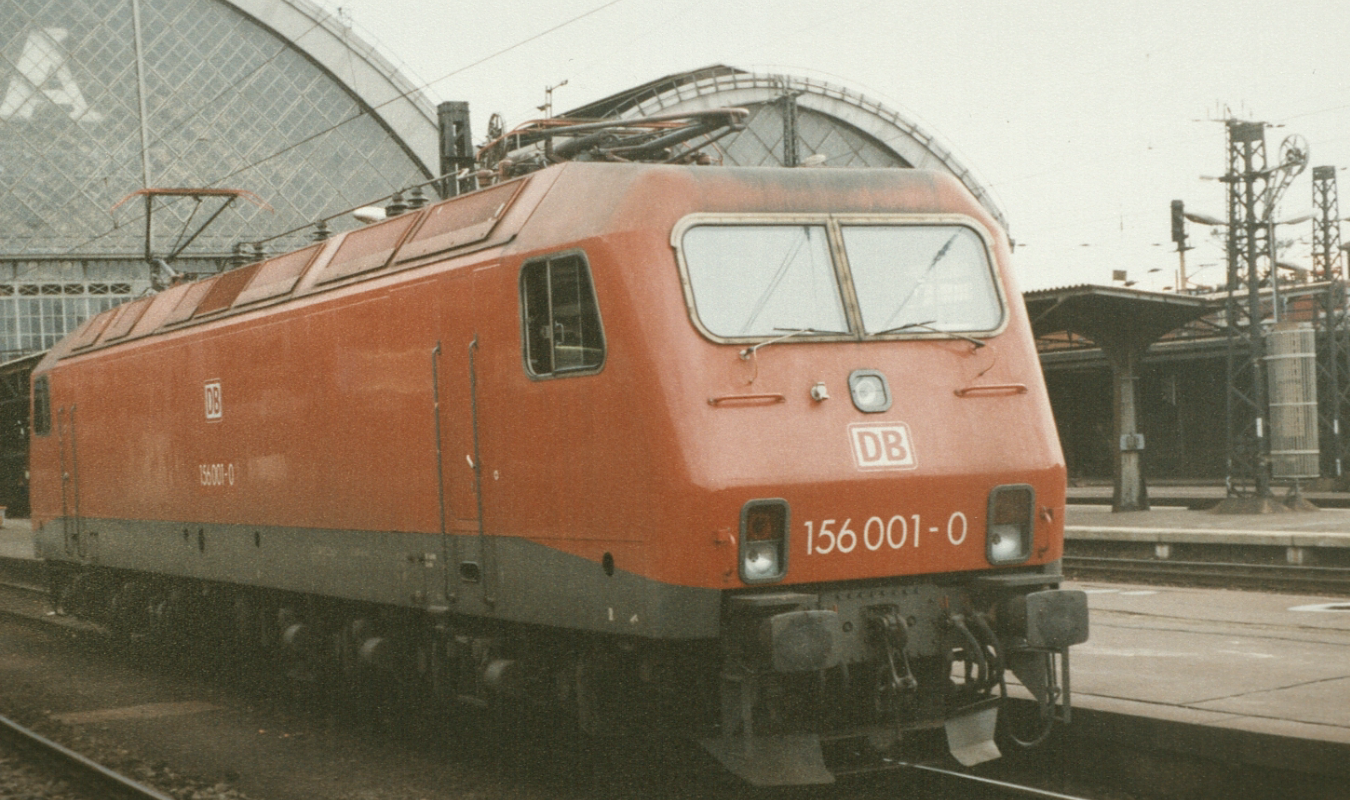
156 001 already with new number 1995 in Dresden

The locomotives were based at the Dresden-Friedrichstadt depot. The prototypes were renumbered class 156 on 1 January 1992 in accordance with the new DB locomotive classification scheme, while retaining their serial numbers. The official entry into service of the four locomotives into the Deutsche Reichsbahn fleet took place by February 1992. Despite their comparatively low maximum speed, their use was not limited to heavy freight trains in the Dresden area, but at the beginning of the 1990s in particular, the locomotives could often also be found in front of passenger trains and occasionally even long-distance trains. For example, the locomotives of this class were regularly used in front of an express train to Nauen for a certain period of time and thus even reached the Berlin area. Circulation plans of the class 156 from 1993 show not only services in front of freight trains with the destinations Chemnitz-Hilbersdorf, Reichenbach (Vogtl.), Leipzig-Stötteritz or Engelsdorf, Hosena (then still Hohenbocka), Freiberg (Sachs.) or even Berlin-Pankow, but also operations in front of passenger trains, e.g. on the Dresden-Neustadt-Cottbus-Frankfurt (Oder) route as well as in front of some Interregios on the steep Saxon-Franconian trunk line between Dresden and Reichenbach.

The locomotives were also used in mid-1992 in front of the D 438/439 between Dresden and Nauen, although the expansion of the Berlin-Dresden line to 160 km/h had already been completed in some sections and the Deutsche Reichsbahn had faster locomotives of the new 112 series at its disposal.

The locomotives were also regular guests in Leipzig, Cottbus, Senftenberg and Hoyerswerda. However, the main area of operation for the class 156 was heavy freight traffic on the line between Dresden and Reichenbach (Vogtl), with the hub of all operations remaining in Dresden.

==== Deployment at DB Cargo and Railion ====
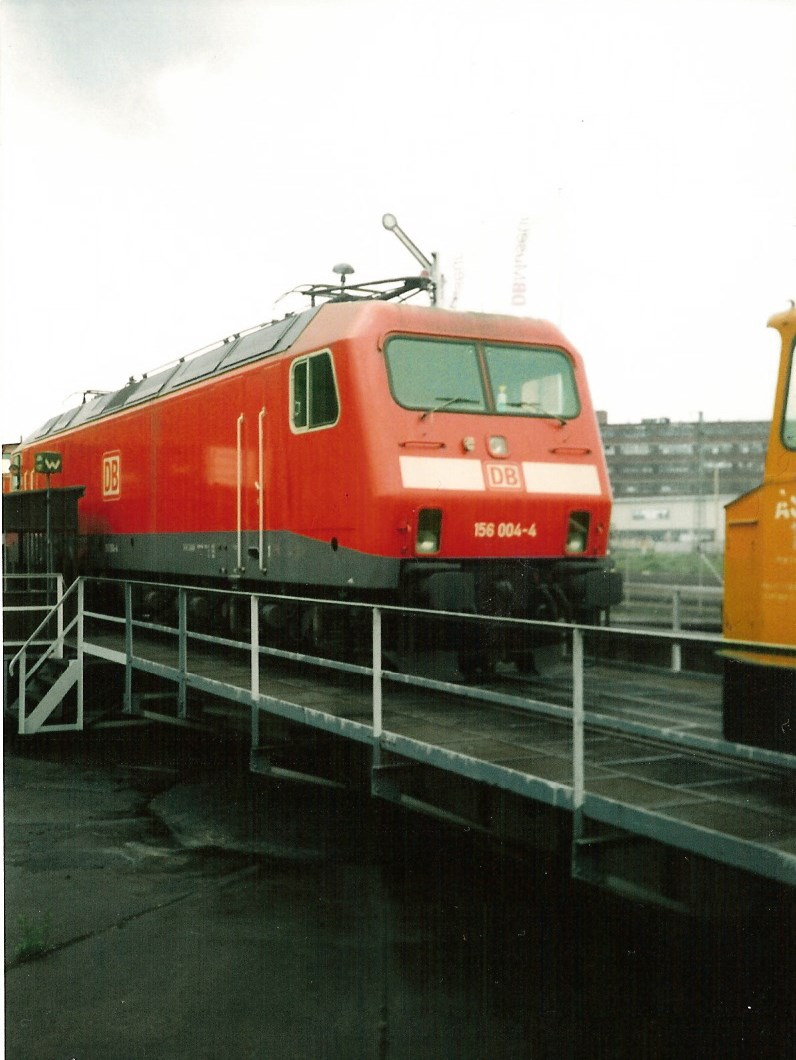
156 004 at the Dresden Steam Locomotive Festival 2002

After the locomotives came to DB Cargo in 1998, the four locomotives seemed to be in a bad way, because as a very small class, they were likely to be retired soon. In mid-1998, 156 002 suffered damage in a shunting accident. At around the same time, most of the locomotives were due for main inspections. Thanks in part to the commitment of the factory in Dresden, it was possible to arrange for renewed main inspections (IS 703) despite the loner status of the class 156, which took until the beginning of 2002 for the 156 004 due to a missing spare part. The 156 003 was given a new traffic red livery with Railion lettering and lost its oriental red paint with bib.

On the occasion of the Dresden Steam Locomotive Festival in June 2002, all four locomotives were once again presented to visitors at the Dresden Altstadt depot.

The locomotives continued to run freight trains to their original destinations for several days. At the same time, consideration was given to transferring the locomotives to the Franconian Forest from 4 February 2002 in order to use them on the Franconian Forest incline in banking service and to replace the significantly older class 150 locomotives. Investigations showed that the locomotives would only be suitable for this use to a limited extent and so they were ordered to be withdrawn from service on 15 December 2002.

Although planned for December, the locomotives were already parked on 18 October 2002 and stored in the Dresden-Friedrichstadt freight yard in a preserved state. In contrast to other series parked at the same time, it was planned from the outset to sell the locomotives rather than scrap them. The storage nevertheless left damage to some of the machines, for example rainwater penetrated 156 002 during the storage period.

==== Used by the Central German Railway ====
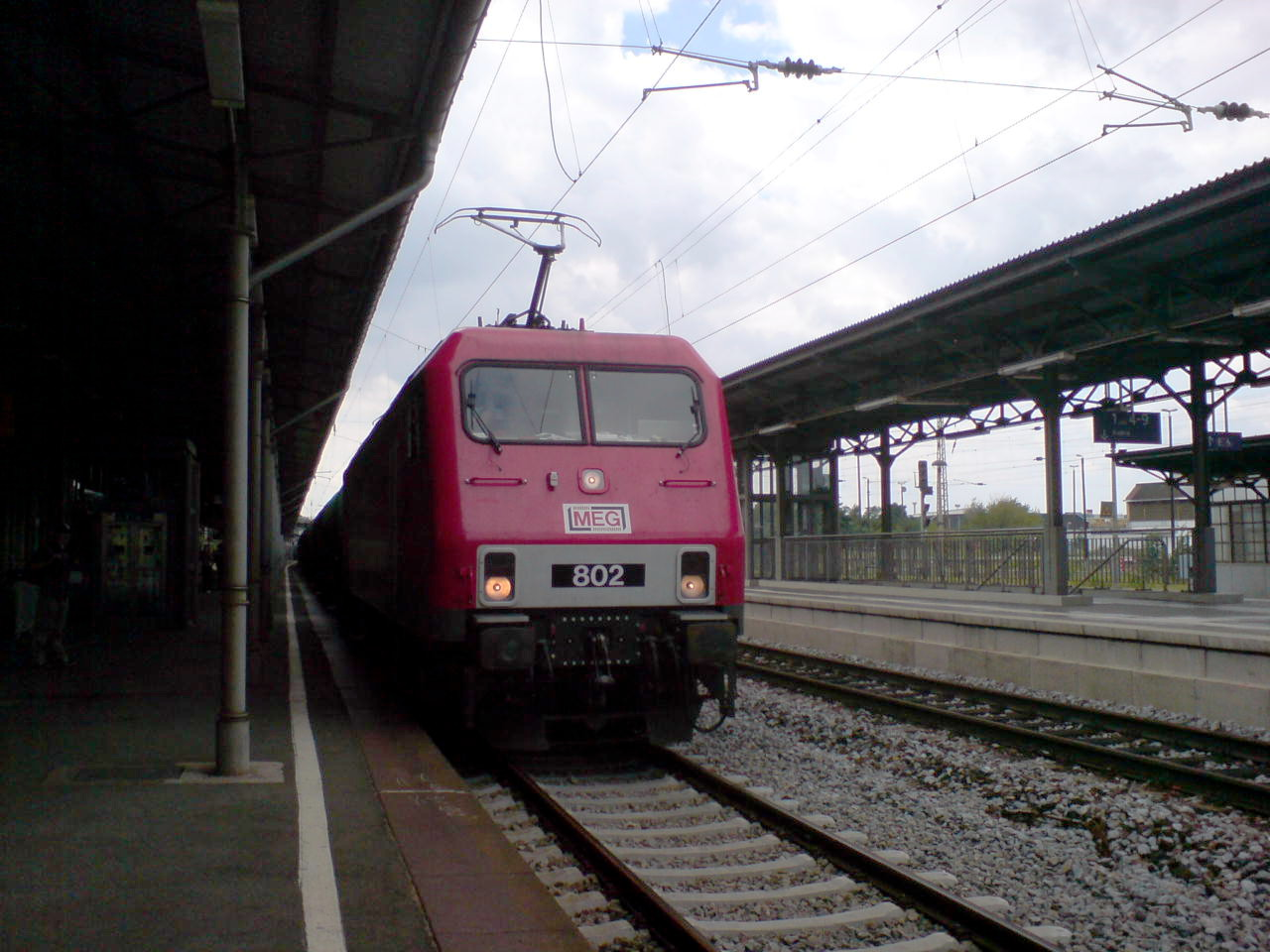
MEG 802 (ex 156 002) on 25 July 2007 in Riesa

Locomotive 804 leaves Döbeln main station with a heavy tank wagon train to Stendell

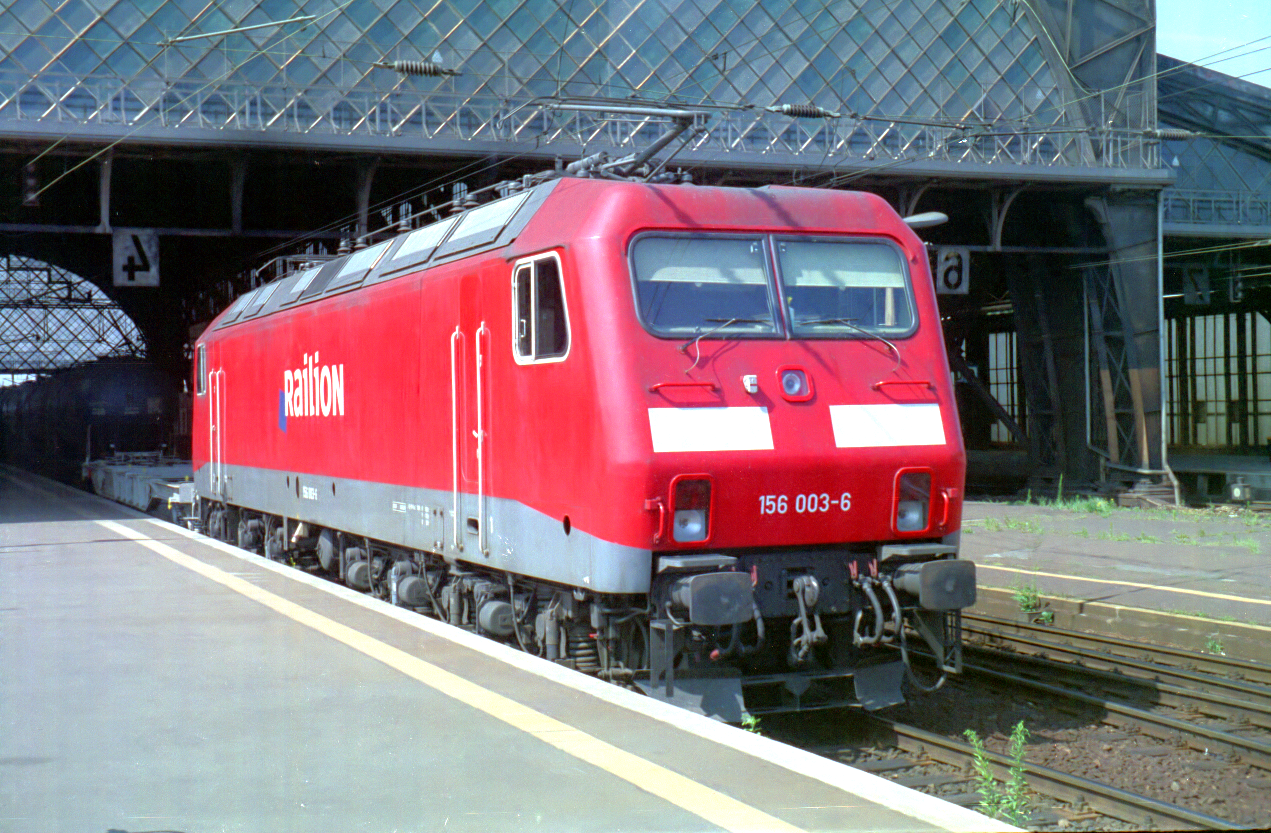
156 003 at Dresden-Neustadt station in the days of DBAG (2000)

The locomotives were sold to Mitteldeutsche Eisenbahn GmbH (MEG) after a year of storage, and removed from Deutsche Bahn's fleet on 5 September 2003.

The reason for the withdrawal of the four locomotives from DB Cargo is said to have been problems with the allocation of personnel, as only a few drivers had been trained for the class 156. After the locomotives had been refurbished, they were put into service with MEG, with 156 004, which was given the road number 804 at MEG, being the first to go into service, while 156 001 was still parked in Dresden-Friedrichstadt until November 2004.

They were used by the MEG several times a week in front of heavy tank car trains with heating oil. The locomotives were also used in front of cement trains between Rüdersdorf bei Berlin and Rostock-Seehafen. In spring 2007, locomotive 802 (former 156 002) received a general overhaul and a new MEG livery in traffic red, which differs significantly from the previous DB traffic red livery. Among other things, the locomotives now have a modified contrasting surface, which is now located between the headlights. The new look is very reminiscent of the former DR livery of the former 252 002. Since the MEG took over the locomotives, main inspections for the 156 series are no longer carried out at the Dresden-Friedrichstadt works, but at the Dessau works.

With the introduction of the UIC-EDV numbers, the locomotives were given back their old operating numbers. Initially, these were only added to the sides in twelve-digit format, but around 2015 they were also added to the ends in the classic seven-digit format. Since 31 January 2007, the class 156 locomotives have been regularly used to haul an intermodal service from Guben to Neuss in the Ruhr region. In the spring of 2007, test runs took place at MEG, during which the 804 was used in front of freight trains together with the 185 090 locomotive rented from DB. The 156 002 was sold to Fahrzeugwerk Karsdorf in June 2020. 156 001, 003 and 004 followed at the end of 2021.

== Construction ==
=== Basic concept ===
While the design of the 250 series was largely based on the 242 series, proven components from the 243 series were used in the development of the 252 series. Due to the short time of less than a year between the completion of the technical conditions and the delivery of the prototype locomotives, these four advance locomotives served primarily as test vehicles for various newly developed assemblies. For example, the 252 002 to 004 were the first DR locomotives to be fitted with an auxiliary converter instead of a rotary converter for the three-phase electrical system.

=== Drive ===
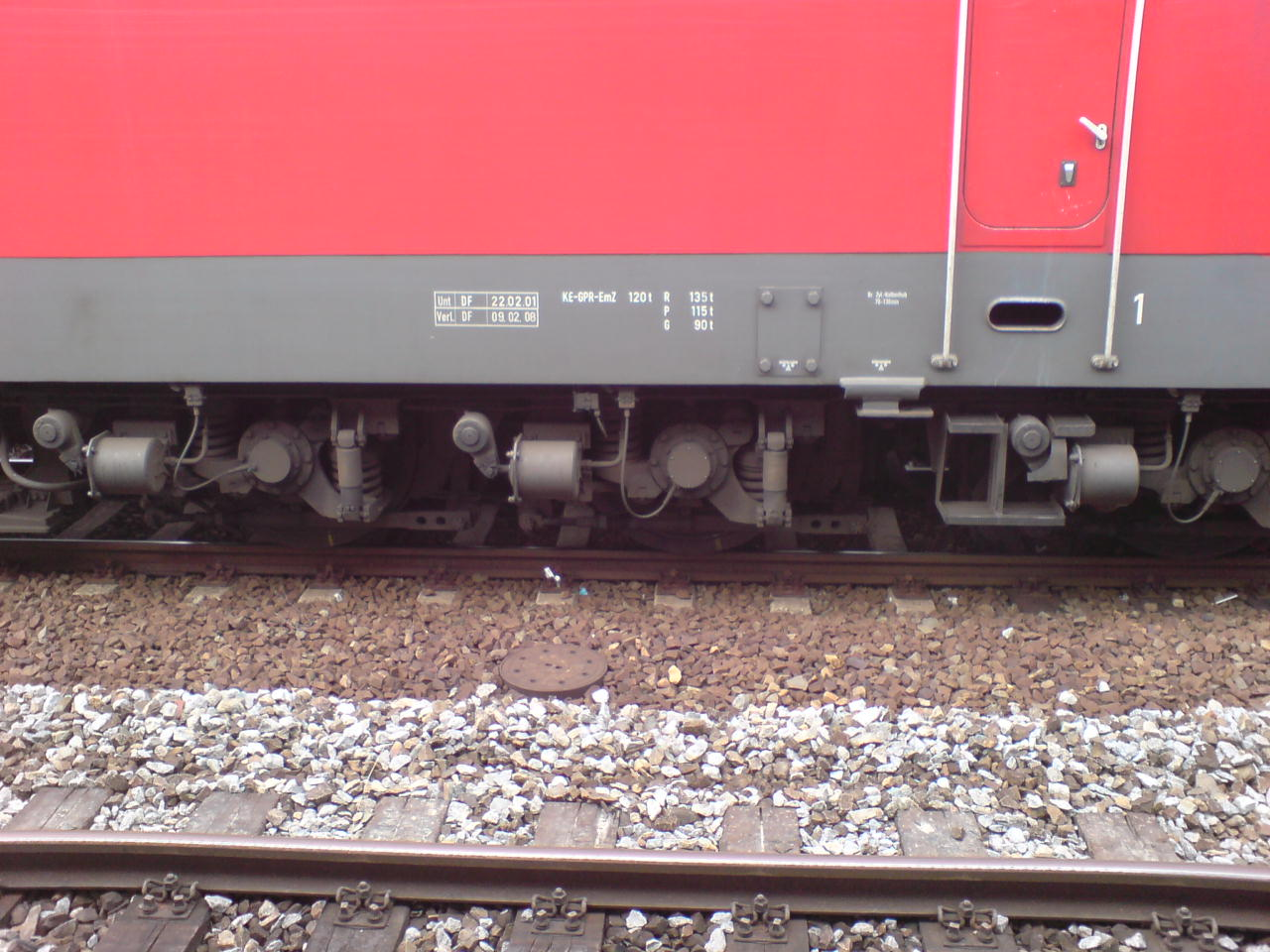
View of the bogie (MEG 804)

The locomotives run on two three-axle bogies with a frame of welded steel construction, which largely correspond to those of the 250/155 series. The cross-sections of the cross and longitudinal members are box-shaped. The main cross member accommodates the bogie pivot. Cylindrical roller bearings are used as axle bearings, which are guided by lemniscate links. The 252 001 has a wheel flange weakening of ten millimetres on the middle wheelset. This wheel flange weakening was omitted on the other three locomotives. At the request of the DR, the axles are not laterally displaceable in order to be able to use uniform bearings on all wheelsets. However, it was planned for the series version of the class 252 to ensure that the middle axle could be moved sideways again (similar to the design of the class 250/155). In 1993/94, the 252 001 and 003 were fitted with laterally displaceable center wheelsets in the AW Dessau, which allowed a clearance of one millimeter. Four coil springs per wheelset, which are damped vertically by two hydraulic dampers, form the primary suspension. Additional rubber washers are also connected in series to ensure better structure-borne sound insulation.

=== Engine ===
The locomotives have a LEW tapered ring spring drive. About half of the engine's mass is supported on the wheelset by the conical ring springs, the other half is supported on the bogie frame by rubber thrust springs.

=== Locomotive body and brake equipment ===
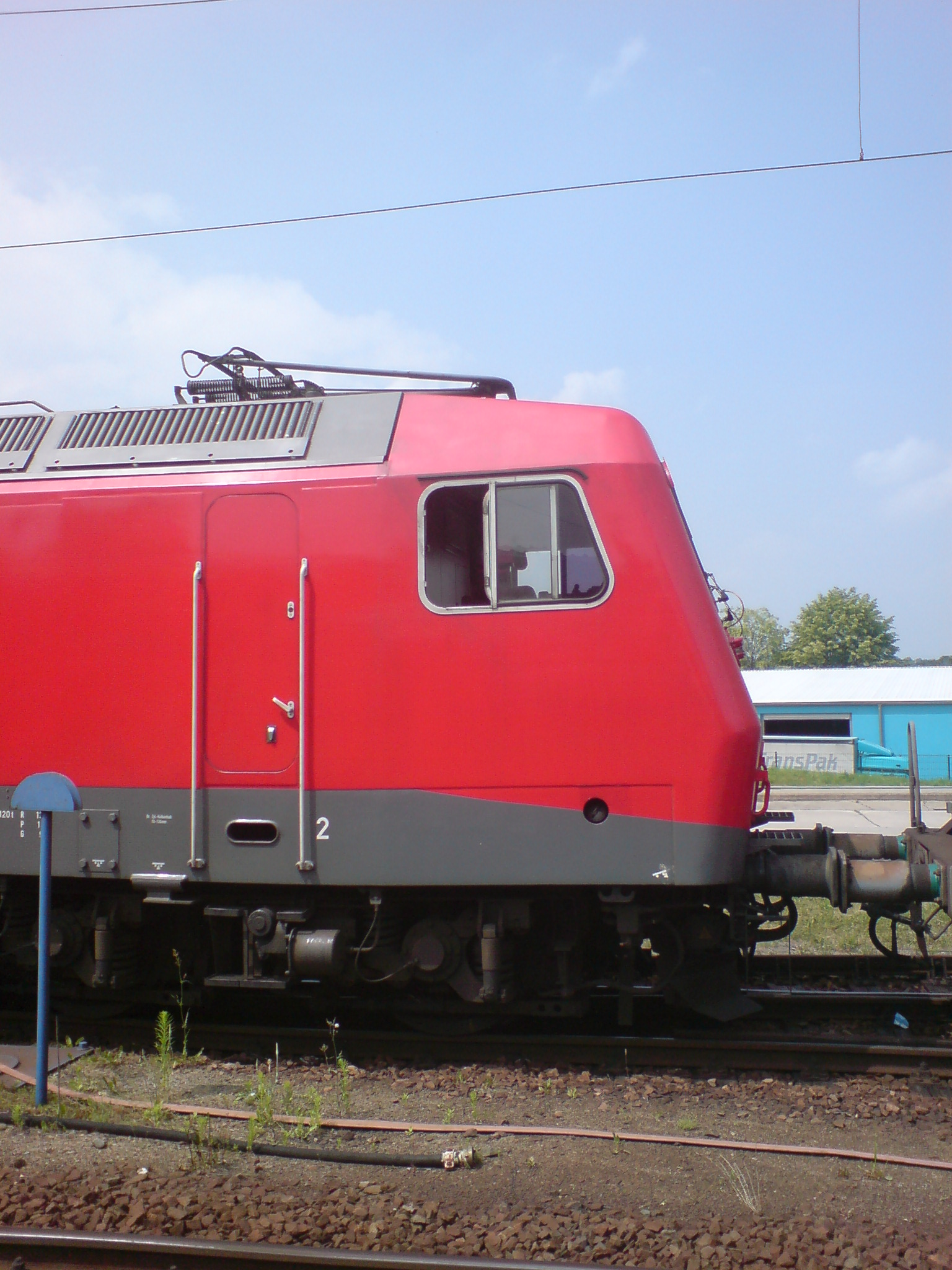
Detailed view of the driver's cab (MEG 804)

The four locomotives have a completely welded self-supporting locomotive body made of lightweight steel. This is similar to that of the DB class 120 and is inclined by 19° in the upper section of the front and by 9° in the lower section. This results in a drag coefficient of 0.45. Tests were carried out in the wind tunnel at the Technical University of Dresden to determine the optimum head shape. The canopies over the engine room are divided into three sections and can be removed. The doors lead into the engine room, which has a side corridor. From there, doors lead to the driver's cabs. The screw coupler and the heavy-duty buffers conform to the UIC guidelines 520, 521 and 527-1. The DR unit train boxes allow the conversion to center buffer couplers. There is also a snow plow on the buffer beam.

The driver's cabs correspond to those of the class 243 and ensure a maximum noise level of 78 dB (A) at a maximum locomotive speed of 120 km/h. In contrast to the locomotives of the 112 and 243 series, the side windows are designed as sliding windows.

The locomotives have the following braking equipment:

- Automatic, multi-application air brake with integrated auxiliary brake
- Non-automatic auxiliary air brake
- Mechanical parking brake
- Catenary-dependent electric resistance brake (brake address KE-GPR-E m.Z)

The locomotives also have a Knorr anti-skid system (type MGS 1.20)

=== Electrical equipment ===
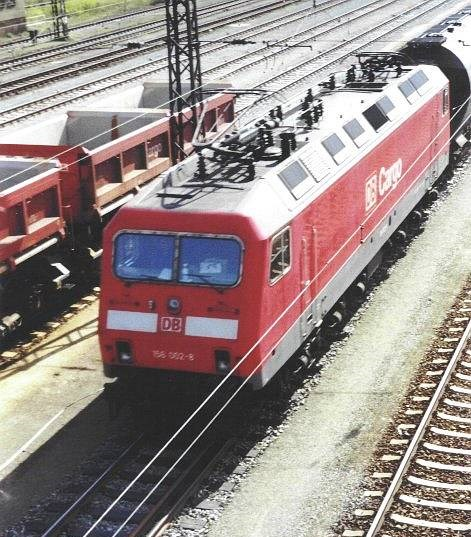
View of the roof equipment of 156 002 (Dresden-Friedrichstadt, 2000)

==== Roof equipment ====
As with the 243 series, pantographss of the VSH2F2 half-scissor design are used. There are also two manually operated TES8F3 roof-mounted disconnectors and a DAT 4a type air circuit breaker with a breaking capacity of 300 MVA. The use of a further development (designated DAT 5) was planned for the series delivery that was no longer realized.

Instead of roof running boards, non-slip coverings were laid to save energy.

==== Main transformer ====
An oil-cooled core transformer with three legs is used in all locomotives of this series. This consists of a variable transformer with 31 taps and a fixed power transformer with a fixed transformation ratio. The primary and secondary windings are split and each feed three traction motor circuits in order to limit the short-circuit currents. Special windings serve the systems for auxiliary operation and brake excitation as well as for the electric train heating. The manufacturer of the main transformers is Transformatorenwerk Oberspree (TRO).

==== Control system ====
The power is controlled via a high-voltage switchgear. This consists of a tap selector, a thyristor controller and a control switchgear and is attached to the main transformer. The design allows an almost infinitely variable setting of the traction motor voltage and consequently the tractive force, which leads to a high utilization of the coefficient of friction between wheel and rail.

==== Traction motor circuit ====
In the 252 series, the traction circuit is designed as a parallel connection of three 16.7 Hz single-phase series-wound motors on the two secondary windings of the power transformer. The traction motors of type ECFB 1110-127 from Sachsenwerk GmbH, Dresden, are identical to those of the 243 series, but have a higher hourly output (980 instead of 930 kW for the 243 series). It was planned to equip the series machines with engines with a higher output (corresponding to the 212/112 series). This would have enabled an hourly output of 6300 kW to be achieved.

==== Electric brake circuit ====
The electric resistance brake is constructed by connecting the six traction motor fields and the six separate traction motor armature circuits in series with a separate part of the braking resistor. This design counteracts sliding processes.

==== Three-phase on-board power supply ====
The first of the locomotives (252 001) still has the rotating converter from Sachsenwerk GmbH, Dresden, known from the class 250 (later class 155). This consists of a 380-volt/16.7-Hertz single-phase asynchronous motor with capacitor auxiliary phase and 380-volt/50-Hertz three-phase synchronous generator and is arranged vertically in the engine room. The three-phase current is used for various auxiliary operations, such as the traction motor fans. In contrast to the 252 001, the locomotives 252 002-004 have a static converter from the manufacturer ELIN Union, Vienna. For optimum supply reliability, a semi-controlled input rectifier, a common intermediate voltage circuit, four separate transistor inverters, each of which feeds its own three-phase network, as well as redundancy protection in the event of an inverter failure by regrouping the consumers were selected. The total auxiliary operating power is 120 kVA, whereby each of the four inverters is designed for 40 kVA. Due to a lack of spare parts, the 156 003 (2017) and 004 received a classic rotary converter as part of their last main inspections. The 156 002 is currently parked as there are no longer any spare parts for the static inverter. A conversion to a rotating converter is planned. However, this will be carried out by the new owner, Fahrzeugwerk Karsdorf. (2018)

==== Control circuits ====
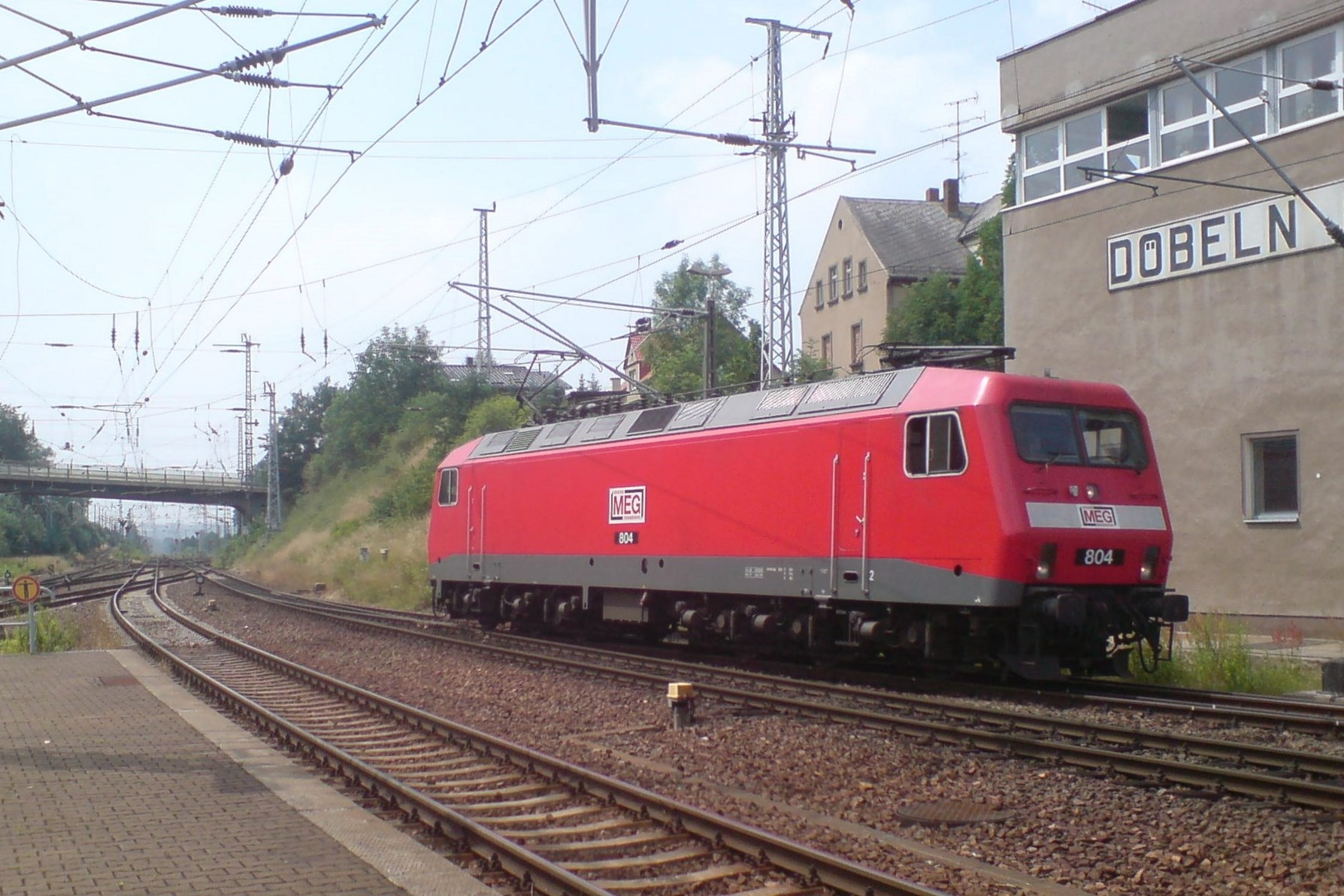
The 252 003 and 004 have a Sibas 16 microprocessor control system

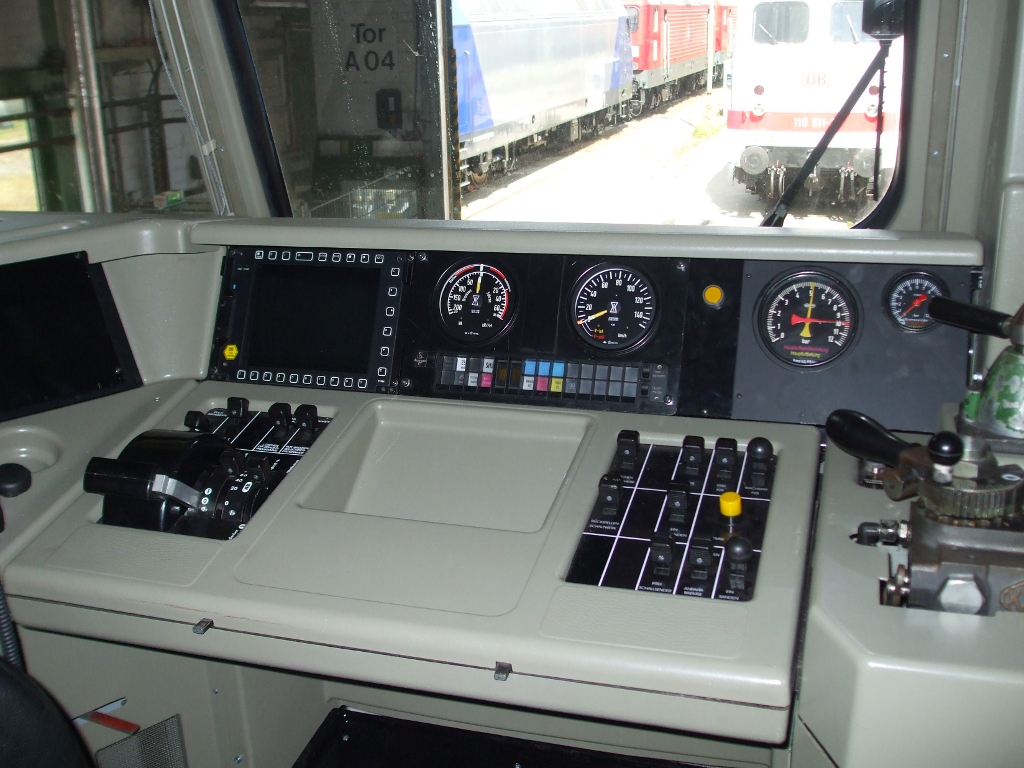
Driver's cab of the MEG 804 in the Dessau factory as of 2009

Different solutions were used for the control and regulation circuits in the four prototypes. As with the 112/243 series, the 252 001 and 002 have wired-programmed LEW control electronics based on highly integrated LSL circuit technology. Plug-in cards serve as the basis for the circuits and components, which are arranged according to their functional relationship and are located in an EGS swivel frame in the driver's cab rear wall 1.

The 252 003 and 004 have a Sibas 16 microprocessor control system (Sibas = Siemens Railway Automation System) from Siemens Mobility. The software for this was developed jointly by Siemens and LEW. The main computer and a spare computer are located in the driver's cab rear wall 1. There are also four SIBAS-KLIP stations distributed throughout the locomotive. There is a display in the driver's cab to show operating statuses and to diagnose faults.

As part of the last main inspections, the Sibas computers were removed from both machines and they were technically adapted to the other two machines. All four locomotives also received a time-division multiplexed dual traction control system (ZDS).

==== Train protection devices and special equipment ====
The locomotives of the 252 series are equipped with a PZB train protection system and a mobile radio for receiving and transmitting system (MESA). The train path radio antenna is located above the driver's cab at one end. The traction units are also equipped with a Sifa deadman's control system and have 13-pin UIC couplings for passenger train service as well as a power supply option for the train busbar with 800 kVA rated power.

Since 2007, 156 001 has been equipped with multiple control, which allows it to be used in double traction with locomotives of classes 112, 114, 143 and 156.

=== Traction capacity ===
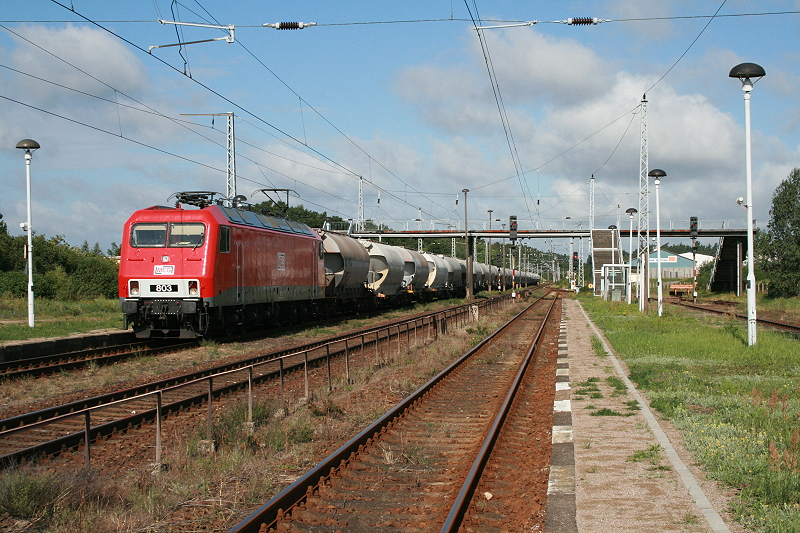
MEG 803 in Kargow (Meckl)

Designed as a heavy freight locomotive, the class 252 is capable of hauling high train masses. The adhesive weight of the machine is 120 tons. The table shows the traction capacity at certain speeds and the remaining tractive power reserve. With a homogeneous composition, InterCargo trains can even be hauled at speeds of up to 120 km/h or with a mass of up to 1800 tons without additional tractive power reserve.

Traction capacity of the 252 series
Train mass/type	Speed	Traction reserve
3000 t Block train	100 km/h	3 N/kN
2200 t Through freight trains	100 km/h	2 N/kN
1700 t InterCargo trains	110 km/h	2 N/kN

=== Liveries ===
Coloring
1994
156 001 (DR)
156 002
156 003
156 004
2002
156 001
156 002
156 003
156 004
2007
MEG 801–803
MEG 804

The four locomotives were not only distinguished by their different technical components when they were delivered, the vehicles were also painted in different colors. Three locomotives were painted signal red (RAL 3001) at the factory, only the 252 003 was painted in oriental red. While the frame of the 252 001, 002 and 004 was painted dark grey, the 252 003 was given a frame in the same color as the locomotive body, which was set off on the sides with a white decorative line. The front of the 252 001 was kept very plain. The 252 002 and 004 had a bright contrasting area between the headlights, on which the locomotive number was applied in negative lettering. The 252 003 was fitted with a typical DB bib.

Different variants were chosen for the arrangement of the locomotive number and the ownership features. In contrast to the locomotives of the 143/243 series, none of the locomotives had metal locomotive plates. In 1999, the 156 003 was the first of its series to receive a traffic red paint job (RAL 3020) with Railion lettering on the sides, after the orient red paint job had already faded considerably. It lost the Railion lettering just one year later in favor of a DB logo (colloquially known as the "DB cookie"). Although the three other locomotives were also painted in traffic red, there were still differences. The 156 001 and 002 were provided with DB Cargo lettering, the 156 004 only with an oversized DB logo.

When the locomotives were taken over by MEG, all vehicles were given the MEG emblem as a new property feature. Since 2007, the appearance of the locomotives has changed in the course of general inspections. Unchanged traffic red, the bright contrasting area between the headlights is strongly reminiscent of the DR livery of the 252 002 and 004. On the occasion of the tenth anniversary of the Mitteldeutsche Eisenbahn, the 803 was given a special livery, which was presented on 5 September 2008. In 2009, the 804 was the last locomotive to be painted in the current MEG color scheme.

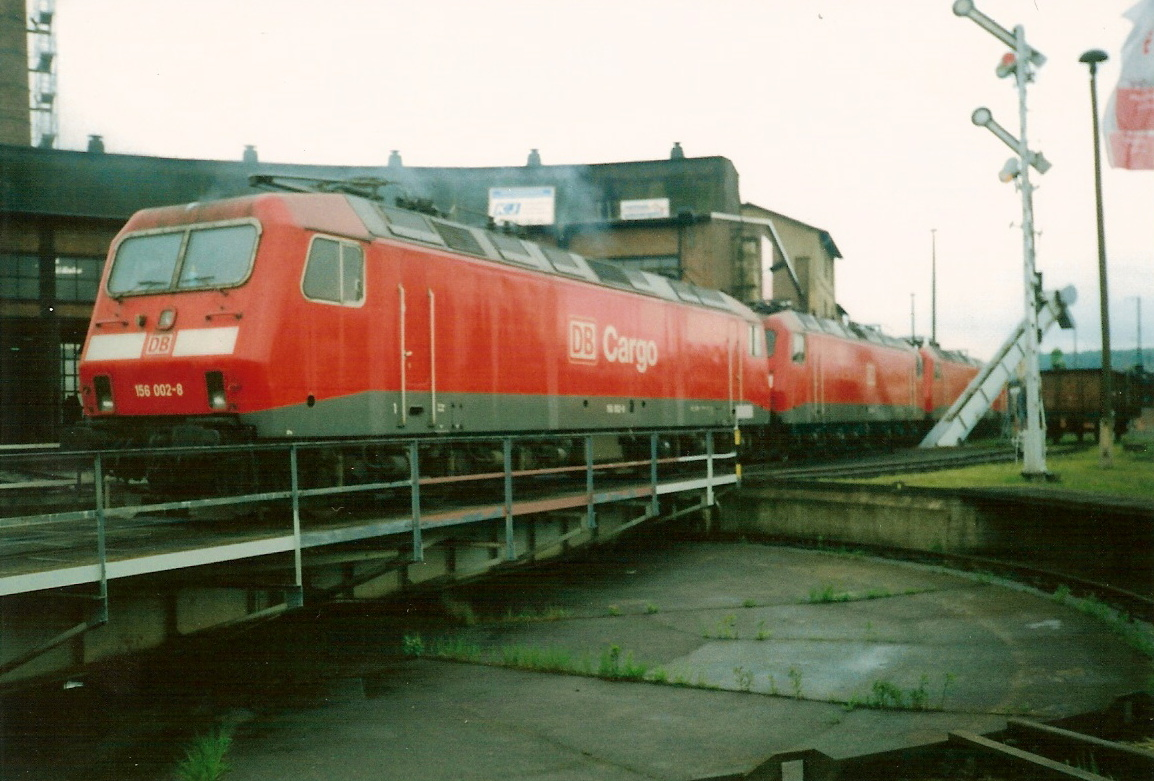
Different DB Cargo paint finishes

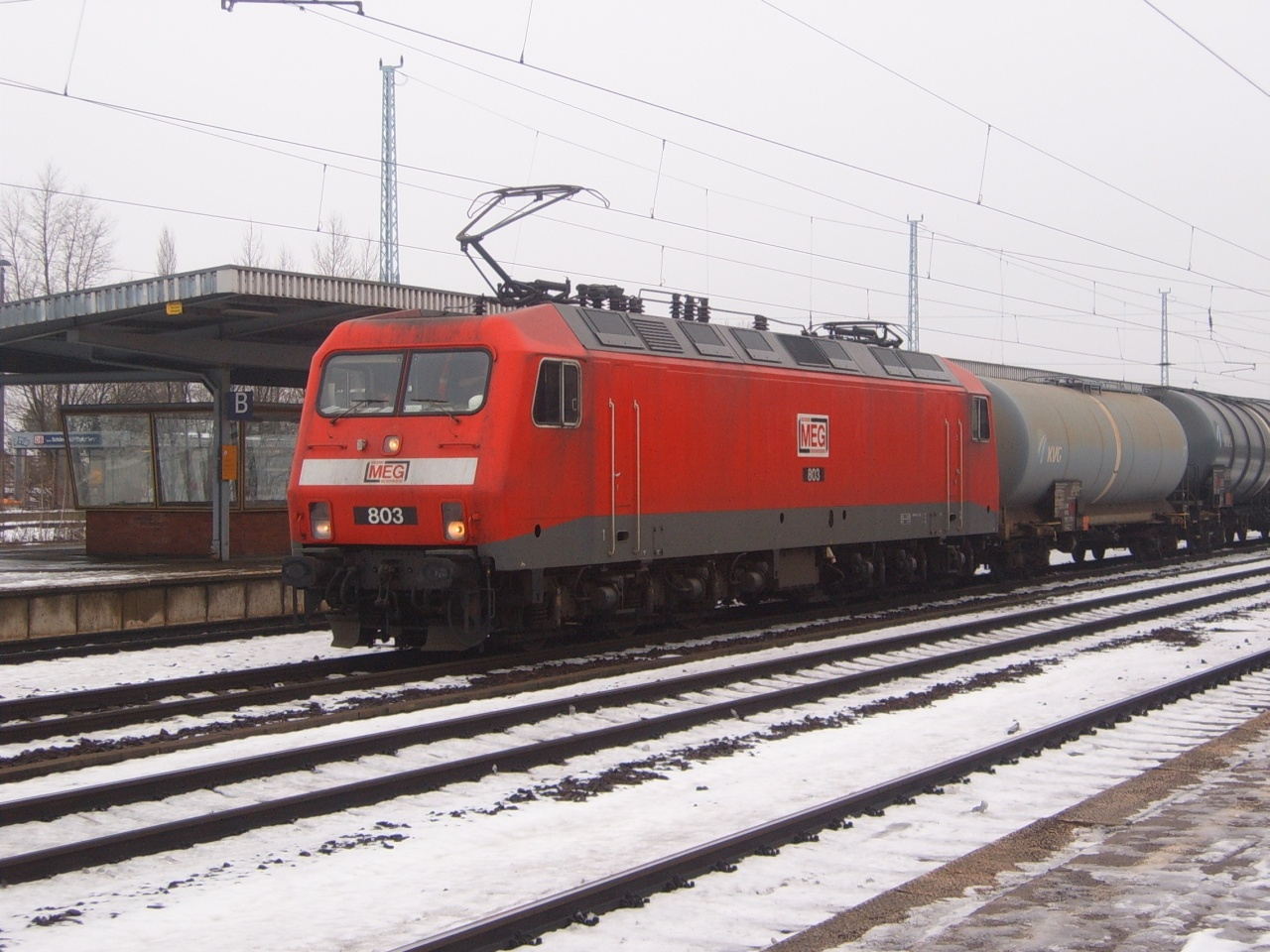
MEG 803 in Berlin-Schönefeld

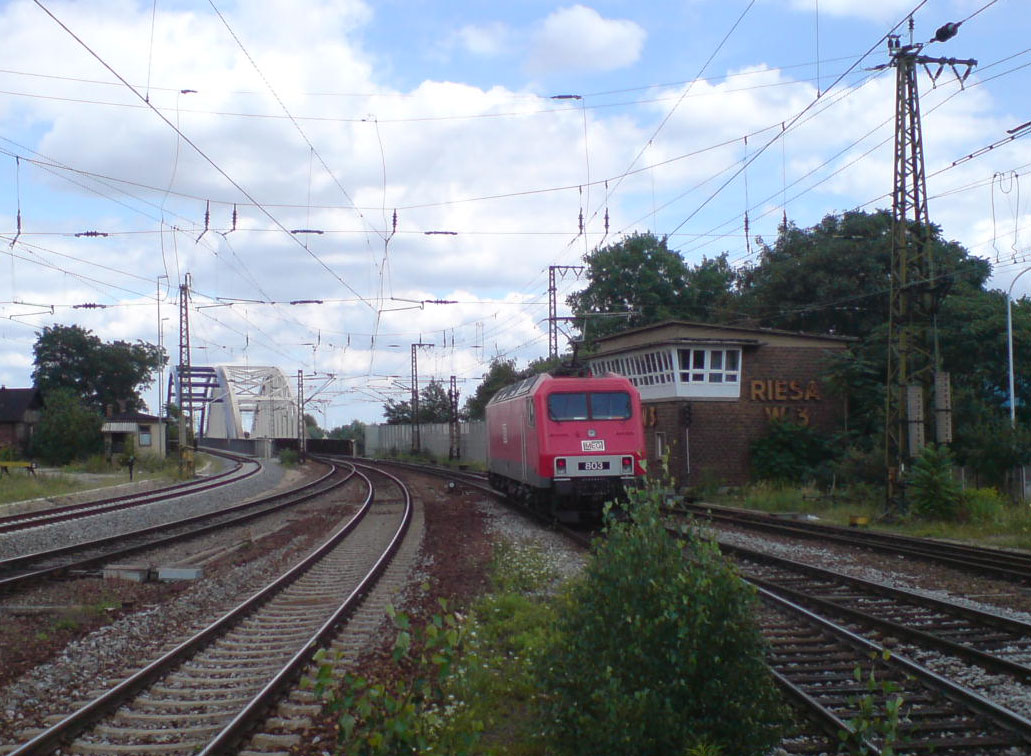
MEG 803 with new paintwork

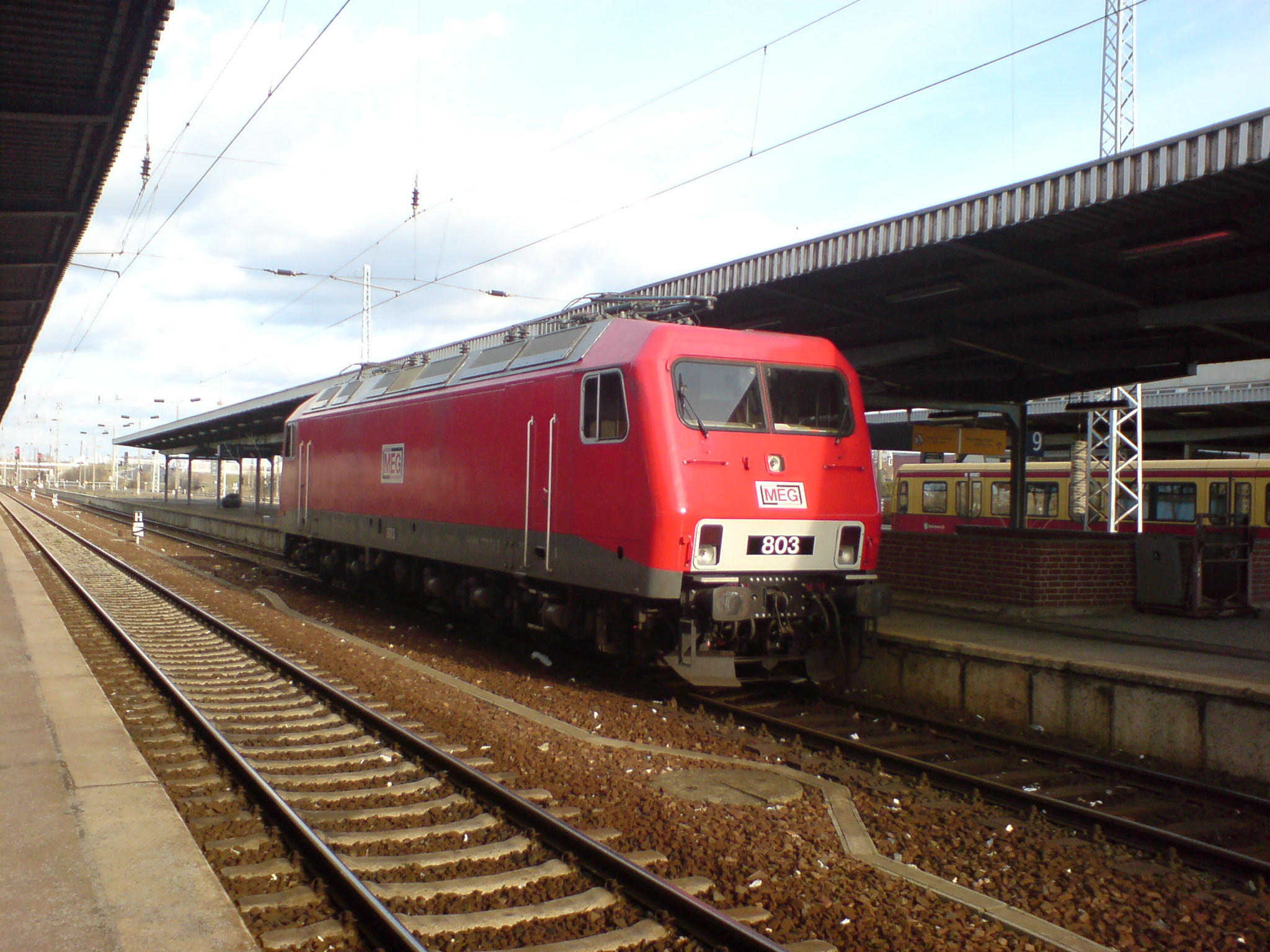
MEG 803 with new livery in Berlin-Schönefeld

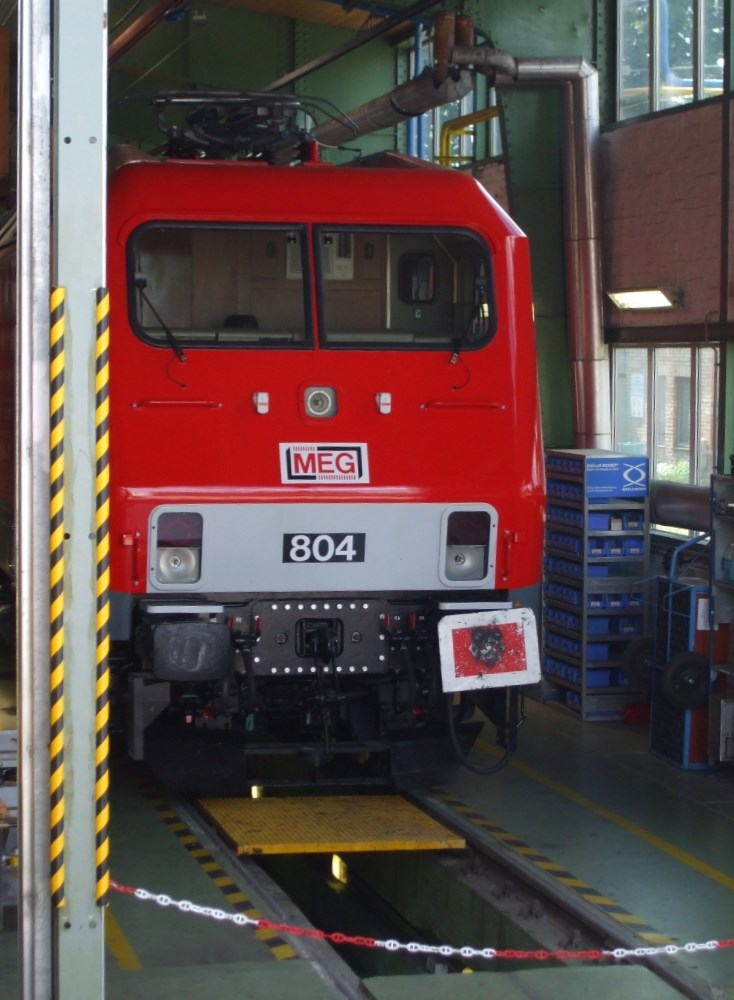
MEG 804 freshly painted in AW Dessau, 28 July 2009

=== Further technical adjustments since 2008 ===
To ensure more reliable use of the four locomotives, MEG decided to equip all four locomotives with the ZDS control system in cooperation with the Dessau plant and thus further adapt the control technology to the class 143 and 155 locomotives also used by the company. This improved the reliability of the four locomotives as well as making it easier to use them together with machines from the other series. The control technology of the four prototypes of the 252 series, which in some cases even differed between the locomotives, required considerably more maintenance and the supply of spare parts for defective components was sometimes difficult.

== Literature ==
=== Books ===
- Dieter Bäzold, Günther Fiebig: Deutsches Lok-Archiv: Elektrische Lokomotiven. Transpress-Verlag, Berlin 1992, ISBN 3-344-70748-5
- Michael Dostal: Baureihen 112, 143. Moderne Elektrolokomotiven für ganz Deutschland. GeraMond Verlag, München 2000, ISBN 3-932785-50-9
- Thomas Estler: Das große Lokomotivtypenbuch. Transpress-spezial, Transpress-Verlag, Stuttgart 2004, p. 212, ISBN 3-613-71247-4

=== Magazines/Articles ===
- Christian Urbanke: Moderne Steuer- und Informationstechnik auf Bahnfahrzeugen. (spez. SIBAS) In: Glasers Annalen: Zeitschrift für Eisenbahnwesen und Verkehrstechnik. Nr. 110, Juni/Juli 1986, p. 223–231, ISSN 0373-322X
- Eisenbahn-Kurier 3/91, 5/91, 10/91, 07/01, 01/03, 09/03, 10/03, 11/03-01/04, EK-Verlag, Freiburg ISSN 0170-5288
- Ekkehard Gärtner / Horstmar Seyfarth: Die neue elektrische Lokomotive der Baureihe 156 der Deutschen Reichsbahn. In: Glasers Annalen: Zeitschrift für Eisenbahnwesen und Verkehrstechnik. Nr. 116, Oktober 1992, p. 406–415, ISSN 0373-322X
- LOK Report 8/91, 5/92, 6/92, 12/93, Arbeitsgruppe LOK Report e. V. ISSN 0344-7146
- Miba: die Eisenbahn im Modell 06/01, MIBA-Verlag ISSN 0723-3841

=== Other publications ===
- SIBAS^{®} 32 – Das Steuerungssystem für alle Schienenfahrzeuge, Druckschrift von Siemens Transportation
