= DR Class E 251 =

DR Class E 251 DBAG Class 171
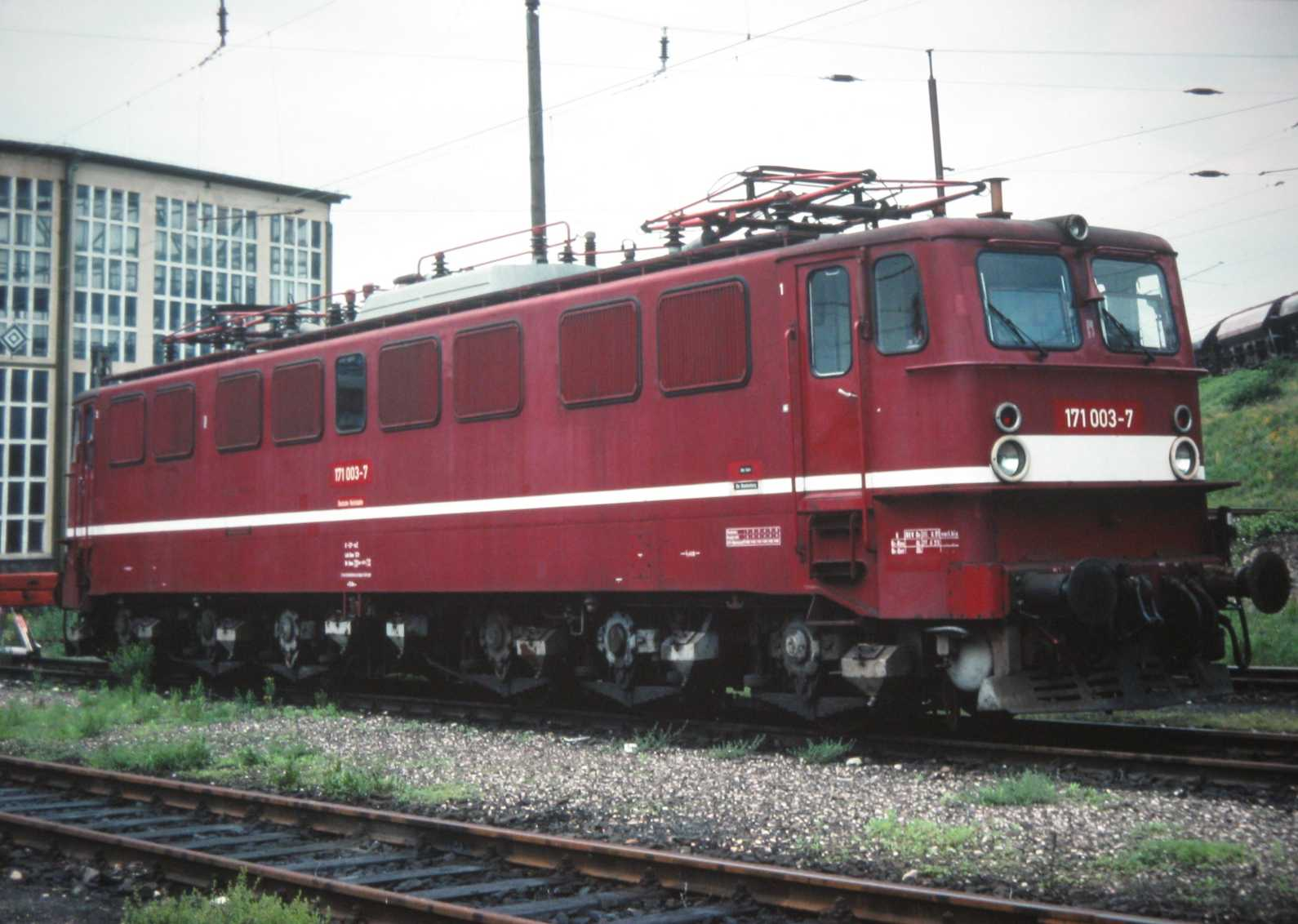
- 171 003 1993 in Blankenburg
Type and origin
- Builder: LEW
- Build date: 1965
- Total produced: 15
Specifications
- Configuration
  - UIC: Co′Co′
- Gauge: 1,435 mm (4 ft 8 1/2 in)
- Length
  - Over beams: 18,640 mm (61 ft 1.9 in)
- Axle load: 20.7 t (20.4 long tons; 22.8 short tons)
- Service weight: 124.0 t (122.0 long tons; 136.7 short tons)
- Electric system/s: 25 kV 50 Hz AC Catenary
- Current pickup: Pantograph
- Traction motors: 6
- Transmission: Tatzlager Motor
- Loco brake: Compressed-air brake electric brake
- Train protection: Sifa
Performance figures
- Maximum speed: 80 km/h (50 mph)
- Power output
  - 1 hour: 6×610 kW (818 hp) = 3,660 kW (4,910 hp)
  - Continuous: 3,300 kW (4,400 hp)
- Power index: 29.5 kW/t
- Tractive effort
  - Starting: 373 kN (84,000 lb_{f})
Career
- Numbers: DR E 251 001–015; DBAG 171 001–015

The East German electric locomotives of DR Class E 251 (from 1970: 251, DBAG Class 171) were not standard engines either within the Deutsche Reichsbahn's or subsequently the Deutsche Bahn's fleet, due to the different specification of their electrical system. They were only used on the Blankenburg (Harz) – Königshütte (Rübeland Railway) line. Because this line had steep inclines, but connecting this isolated branch to the main traction network would have been very expensive, the Deutsche Reichsbahn electrified it in 1965 with a 25 kV 50 Hz system, which was different from the usual German catenary supply of 15 kV 16 2/3 Hz. The 15 Co’Co’ engines were supplied by LEW and registered with the Reichsbahn as E 251 001 to 015.

== Service ==
Of the original 15 locomotives, 11 were deployed until December 2004 in charge of goods trains on the Rübeland Railway. Until that point they were stabled at Bw Blankenburg. Apart from 171 001 and 171 002, which were returned to their original state and placed under conservation protection, almost all locomotives are in the old Bw Zwickau, where they are awaiting future duties in southeast Europe. Class 171-hauled passenger services hauled ended in 2000 because the Federal Railway Office required the installation of door opening systems (Türsteuerung or TB0) on passenger trains. A TBO option for the trains was not followed through for cost reasons. Neither were the engines equipped with Sifa until 1998, because the additional crew member required on steep inclines initially meant that Sifa was not needed.

Electrification of this engine's main route with a 25 kV catenary system had eventually to be carried out both for noise and environmental protection reasons and it was even joined for a while in 2004 by locomotives of classes 185 and 189. However, in 2005 there was a changeover to diesel locomotives of classes 233 and 241 operated by Railion as well as the Blue Tiger. Previously 2/3 of the transport duties were allocated to the Osthavelländische Eisenbahn (today hvle), so the provision of electric locomotives by Railion was now no longer sufficiently economic.

The introduction of DB Railion locomotives of Classes 233 and 241 ended on 31 March 2006, because the Fels-Werke factory switched all its contracts from 1 April 2006 to the hvle and its Blue Tiger fleet.

== Livery ==
Originally all 15 engines were painted green. From the middle of the 1970s, however, they were resprayed bordeaux red with a wide, ivory-coloured stripe. This was later painted much narrower on the sides. The DB also had the engines repainted in the livery of the time.

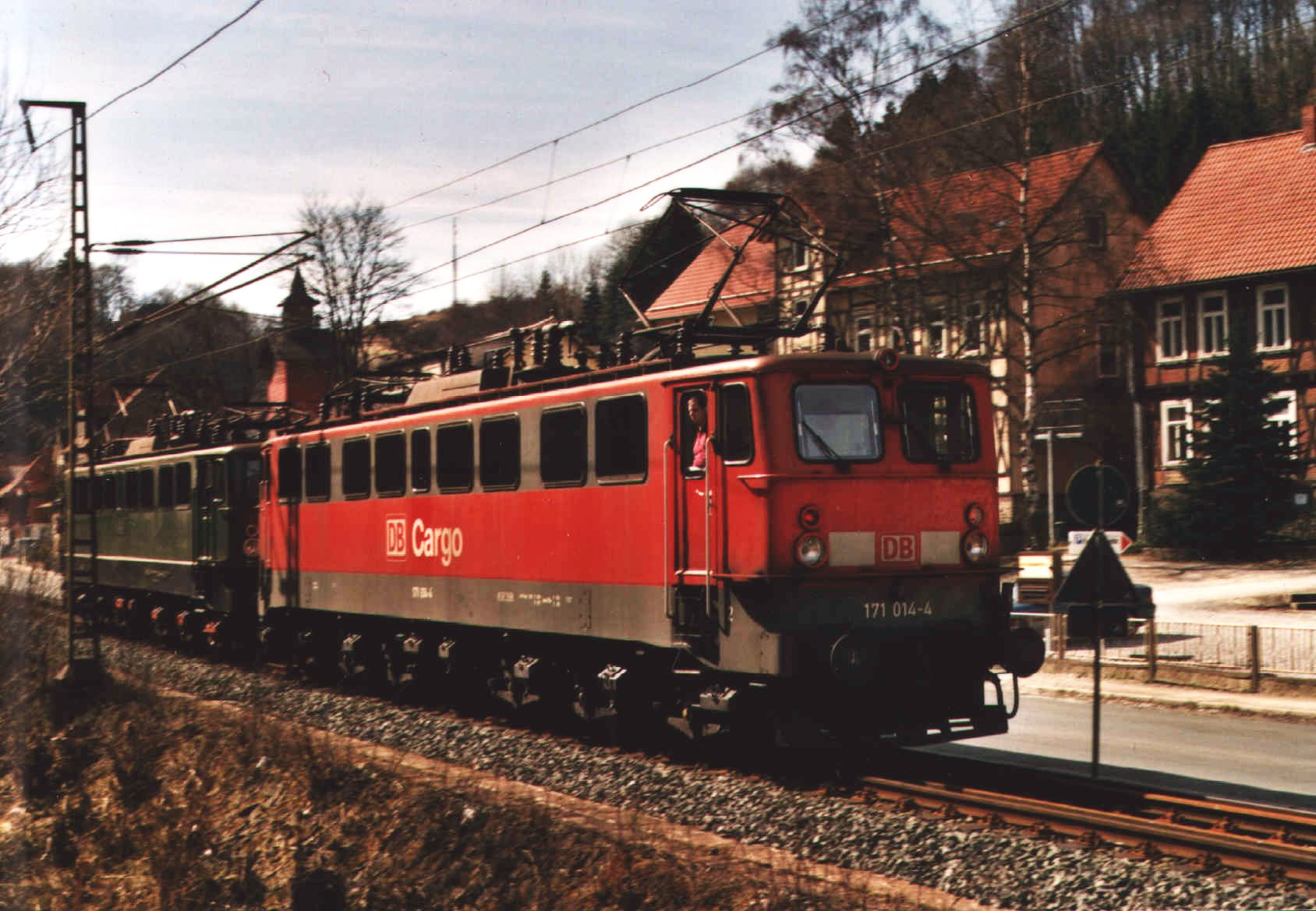
Loks 171 014-4 und E 251 002 in Rübeland

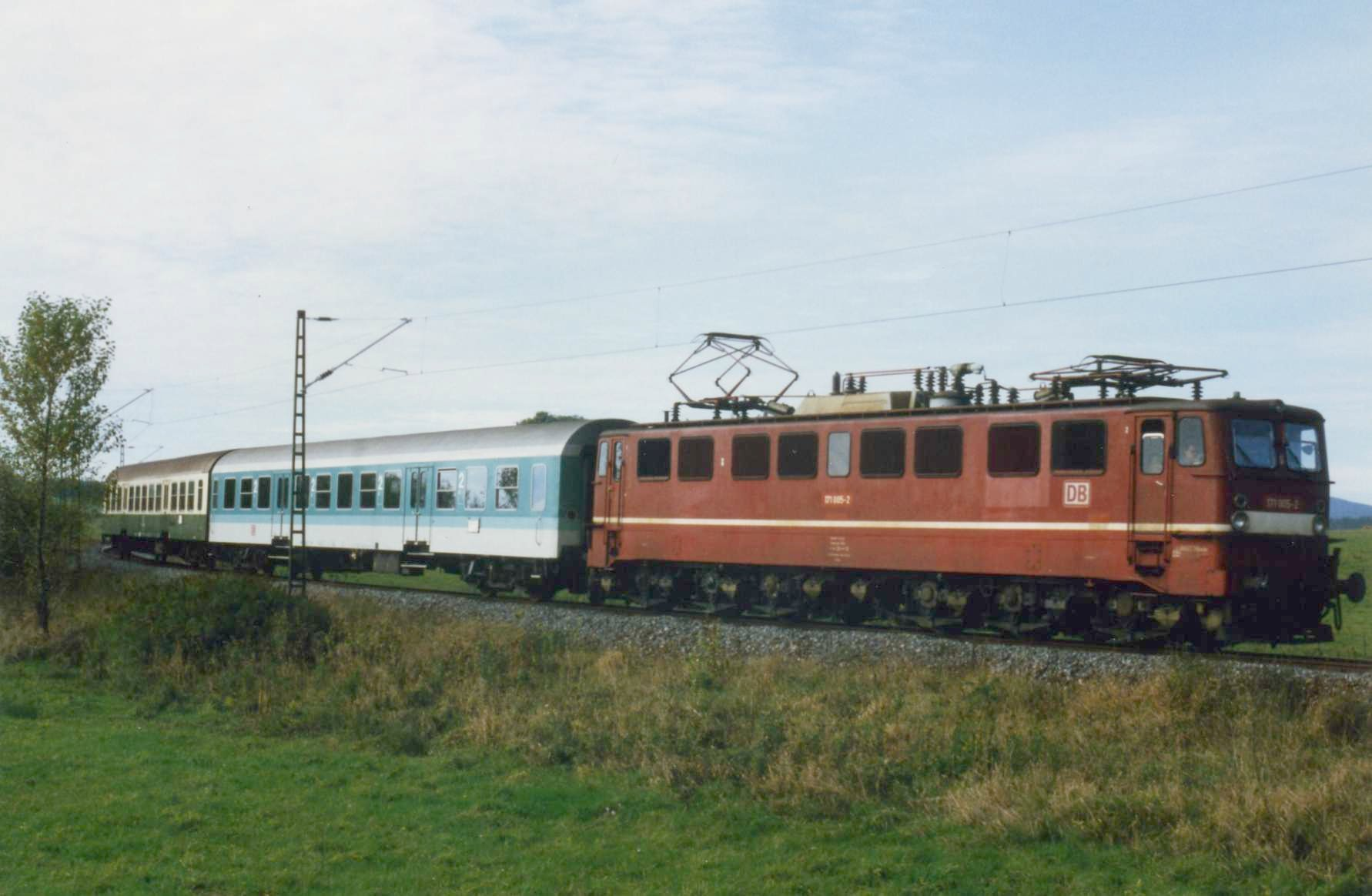
171 005 1995

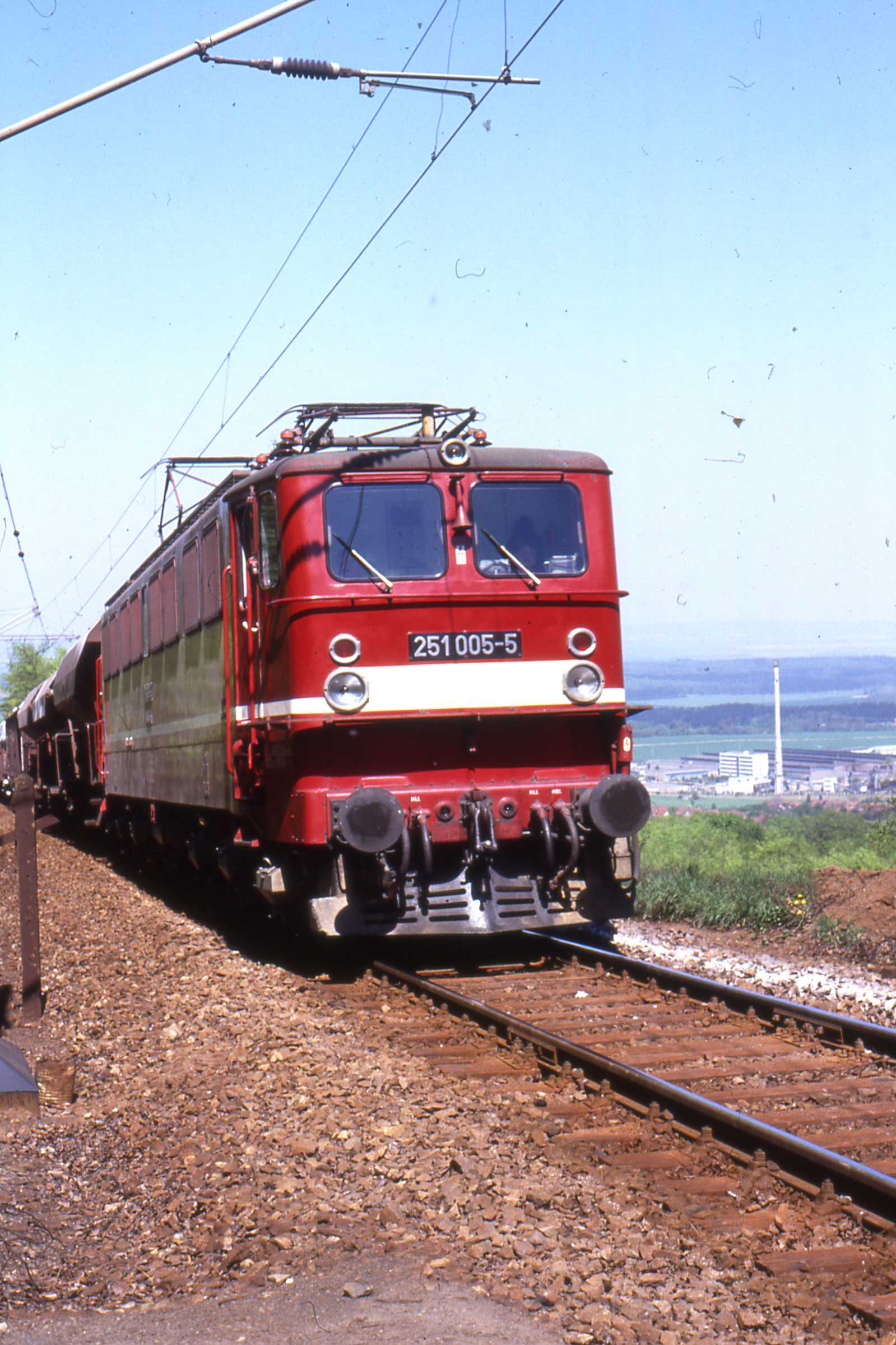
251 005 im Mai 1990

== Preserved ==
Nos. E 251 001 and 002 are today designated as museum locomotives and are based in Blankenburg. Both locos are protected which is also the reason for their remaining in Blankenburg. All other engines of Class 171 were transferred to Zwickau following the termination of their service by Railion Deutschland AG. The locomotive train (comprising 171 011, 171 009, 171 003, 171 008, 171 004, 171 014, 171 013 and 171 005) reached Halle on 13 April 2005 and then continued to Zwickau on 21 April 2005. There the engines were stored in Shed II of the old Bw Zwickau. On 9 February 2006 no. 171 008 was towed by 232 701 from Zwickau to Dresden-Friedrichstadt, where its wheelsets were worked on the underfloor lathe. It was then taken by several diesel locomotives of various classes to Regensburg-Hafen. From there the first locomotive of Class 171 made its way to Romania. There it has been hired to the Logistic Center Bulgaria Branch. This fate was planned for the remaining locomotives in Zwickau, they were to be likewise operated by a Railion subsidiary in Romania. However this has not yet happened and the engines remain in Zwickau. By contrast a museum home was found for no. 171 012. She has gone into the possession of the TEV (Thuringian Railway Society) who will look after the maintenance of the engine and present it at various events. Nos. 171 006, 007, 010 and 015 were dismantled.

Current overview of the remaining locomotives (as at: September 2007)

- 171 001 – green – Blankenburg (Harz) - returned to original delivery state to become a technical monument
- 171 002 – green – Blankenburg (Harz) - returned to original delivery state to become a technical monument
- 171 003 – traffic red (verkehrsrot) – Zwickau
- 171 004 – traffic red (verkehrsrot) – Zwickau
- 171 005 – orient red (orientrot) – Zwickau
- 171 006 – red – scrapped
- 171 007 – red – scrapped
- 171 008 – traffic red (verkehrsrot) – Timișoara in Romania (tests to be carried out to determine whether to send the rest)
- 171 009 – orient red (orientrot) – Zwickau
- 171 010 – red – scrapped
- 171 011 – orient red (orientrot) – Zwickau
- 171 012 – bordeaux red – TEV Weimar
- 171 013 – traffic red (verkehrsrot) – Zwickau
- 171 014 – traffic red (verkehrsrot) – Zwickau
- 171 015 – red – scrapped at Aw Dessau

== Sources ==
- Müller, Siegfried; Seifarth, Horstmar (1998). "E11 E211 E42 E251". Eisenbahn-Kurier (10). Freiburg: EK-Aspekte. ISSN 1611-3985.
