= Renfe Class 276 =

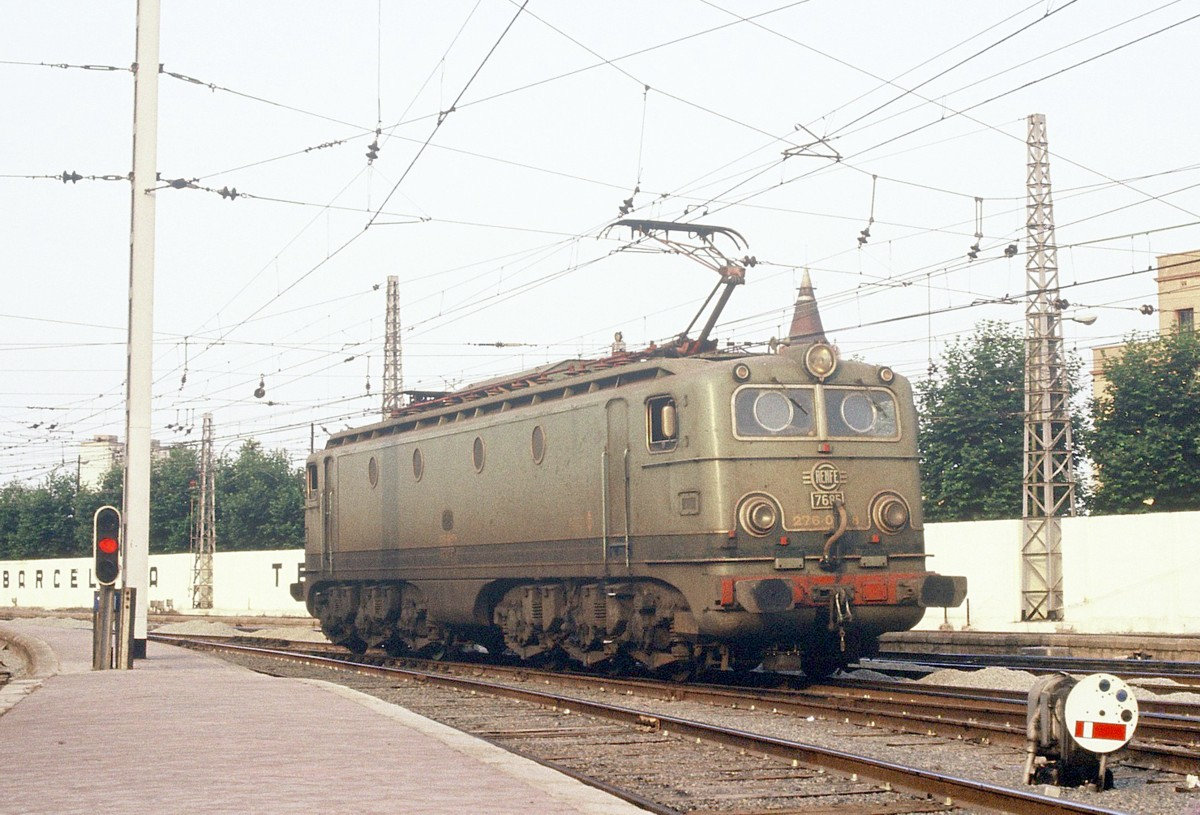
- RENFE Class 276 276.085 (7685)
Type and origin
- Power type: Electric
- Builder: Alsthom (France); CAF (Spain); MACOSA (Spain); MTM (Spain); S.E.C. Naval (Spain)
- Build date: 1956–1965
- Total produced: 136
Specifications
- Configuration
  - UIC: Co′Co′
- Gauge: 1,668 mm (5 ft 5 21/32 in)
- Length: 18.93 m (62 ft 1.3 in)
- Height: 3.86 m (12 ft 7.97 in)
- Loco weight: 120 tonnes (120 long tons; 130 short tons)
- Electric system/s: 3 kV DC Catenary
- Current pickup(s): Pantograph
- Traction motors: Alsthom TA-630-A of 630 kW (845 hp), 6 off
- MU working: See text
Performance figures
- Maximum speed: 110 km/h (68 mph)
- Power output: 2,200 kW (2,950 hp)
Career
- Operators: Renfe
- Nicknames: Francesa
- Locale: Spain

The Renfe Class 276 is a class of DC electric locomotive which was used by the Spanish rail operator Renfe. Based on the French SNCF Class CC 7100, the Class 276 was modified to fit the Spanish 1,674 mm (65.9 in) gauge and use a 3000V DC overhead supply. More than 130 locomotives were supplied to Renfe in 1956.

== History ==
Originally classified by Renfe as 76xx and 86xx (the example in the photograph is number 7685), the 276 series was based on the French SNCF Class CC 7100. The majority of the 276s were manufactured in Spain by various locomotive works, including CAF. Due to their Gallic origins, the locomotives were given the nickname Francesa (English translation: French).

A total of 136 units were built during between 1956 and 1965, ten of which were modernised and classed as 276.2xx.

== Technical data ==
Since the 276 is a Co′Co′ locomotive, it is equipped with two three-axled bogies – each of which is powered by three traction motors. This six traction motor configuration provides the locomotive with a total power output of 2,200 kilowatts (2,950 hp) and a maximum speed of 110 km/h (68 mph). Of the 136 examples produced, only 36 have been adapted for use in multiple unit operations: these are unit numbers 276.101 through 276.137, inclusive.

== Current status ==
This class was withdrawn from regular service by December 2014. However two locomotives are still in existence and these locomotives currently held in reserve in Madrid, are shortly (August 2017) expected to be transferred to the Museum and Railway Centre in Mora La Nova, 30 km inland from Tarragona in Southern Catalonia. From these two machines, one is expected to be restored to full working order and in as near original condition as possible. The two locomotives will swap certain parts to aid quicker restoration of one to full working order. The other will most likely be just cosmetically restored. (Details Courtesy International Liaison Officer - Mora La Nova Museum and Railway Centre, August 2017).
