= Mehano =

Company

Mehano is a Slovenian toy company from Izola, founded in 1952 as Mehanotehnika. It produces a large range of both traditional and electronic toys, as well as model railroad equipment. The company has borne its current name of Mehano since 1990. Mehano applied to restructure in November 2008, following reported economic difficulties during the preceding ten years; production in Slovenia ended. In 2010, Mehano was relaunched with production in China and new branding.

== Mehano model trains ==
Mehano's model train products were a relatively recent addition to their product line, and notable for their choice of esoteric prototypes such as the Camelback steam locomotive and the Thalys high-speed train. Every year, they introduced new entries into the market in the high-speed rail industry. In 2007, they introduced a version of the German InterCityExpress (ICE) eight-unit train consist. They are one of the few manufacturers in the world offering a wide variety of high-speed rail models, including the TGV Duplex. Most consider Mehano model trains to be comparable to Lima and other inexpensive brands, probably because of the low-end American prototype models they have manufactured for American model railroad companies.

At the end of the 1990s, Mehanotechnika shortened its name to Mehano and widened its range with different TGV models. Mehano also manufactured some models for Jouef: The Eurostar, diesel locomotive BB 67007 SNCF ex-Fobbi, a railway crane and track.

In its European product lines, Mehano had been offering higher end features such as DCC, Audio and directional LED head/tail lights. In 2007, Mehano stepped further into the high-end offerings by offering cutting-edge light rail models such as the Syntus 2-unit Alstom Lint 41. They offered three quality lines: Prestige, Hobby Line and Train Line. The Train Line was their entry-level offering for children, while the Prestige Line was their top-of-the-line offering that allowed connectivity to Digital Command Control and sound. Mehano H0 scale products were made for the two-rail direct current system, but they made three-rail, Märklin-compatible versions of some locomotives. Most offerings were also available in N scale, and some in TT scale as well.

In Europe, they were competing with the likes of Märklin, Fleischmann, Roco and others. Since no other manufacturers model the modern high-speed and light rail trains that Mehano offered, they were doing well in the market; however, they had little to no distribution in the US. Walthers, the largest US model train retailer, did not carry any Mehano products. This made Mehano trains rare and hard to find in the US. Mehano products were distributed, in theory, in North America by International Hobby Corporation (IHC). President's Choice is the house brand of the Loblaws grocery chain (Canada's largest). Since 1992, President's Choice have issued 11 train sets made for them by Mehano featuring Canadian versions of locomotives sold by IHC.
