= ADtranz DE-AC33C =

High powered diesel-electric locomotive class

Blue Tiger
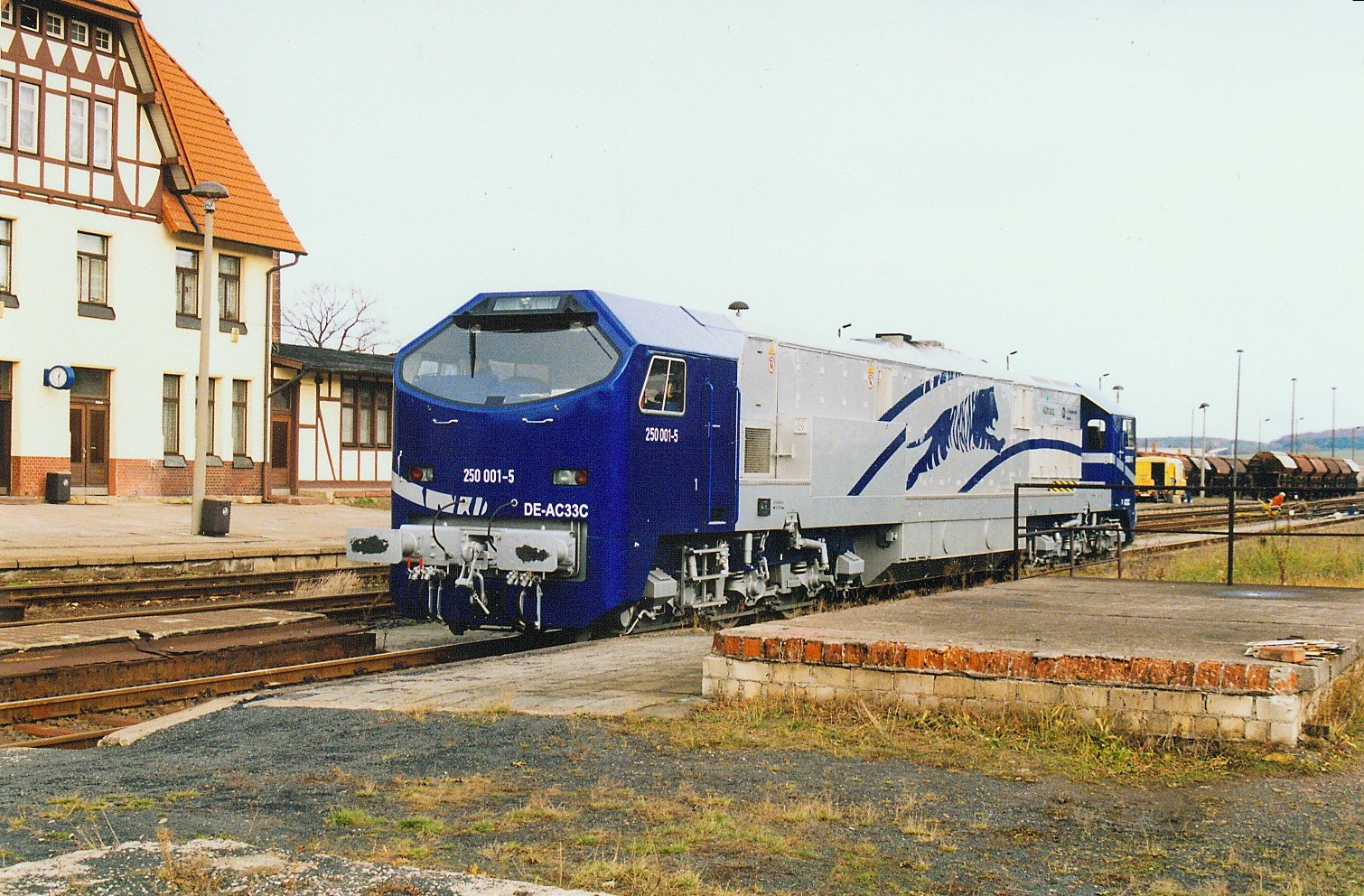
- German Blue Tiger in Vacha, Germany (1997)
Type and origin
- Power type: Diesel-electric
- Designer: Adtranz / GE
- Model: DE-AC33C
- Build date: 1996–2004
- Total produced: Pakistan: 30; Malaysia: 20; Germany: 11; Total: 61
Specifications
- Configuration
  - UIC: Co-Co
- Gauge: Germany: 1,435 mm (4 ft 8 1/2 in); Malaysia: 1,000 mm (3 ft 3 3/8 in) metre gauge Pakistan: 1,435 mm (4 ft 8 1/2 in) standard gauge
- Wheel diameter: Malaysia:965 mm (38.0 in) (max), 890 mm (35.0 in) (min)
- Length
  - Over buffers: Malaysia:22,000 mm (72 ft 2.1 in)
- Axle load: Germany: 21 t (20.7 long tons; 23.1 short tons); Malaysia: 20 t (19.7 long tons; 22.0 short tons)
- Loco weight: Germany: 126 t (124 long tons; 139 short tons); Malaysia: 120 t (120 long tons; 130 short tons)
- Fuel type: Diesel
- Fuel capacity: Germany: 6,000 L (1,300 imp gal; 1,600 US gal); Malaysia: 5,500 L (1,200 imp gal; 1,500 US gal)
- Sandbox cap.: Malaysia:240 liters(3 x 80 liters)
- Prime mover: Malaysia/Germany: General Electric 7FDL12; Pakistan: General Electric 7FDL16
- Engine type: Germany/Malaysia:V12 Diesel Engine; Pakistan:V16 Diesel Engine
- Aspiration: Turbocharged
- Traction motors: Malaysia:GE 5GEB24
- Cylinders: Germany/Malaysia:12; Pakistan:16
- Cylinder size: Malaysia:228.6 mm × 266.7 mm (9.00 in × 10.50 in)
- Transmission: Diesel-electric
- Gear ratio: Malaysia: 1:4.722(18:85 cogs)
- Loco brake: Air brake and Dynamic
- Train brakes: Air brake
- Safety systems: German: ETCS, Sifa, Indusi
Performance figures
- Maximum speed: 120 km/h (75 mph)
- Power output: German models: 2,460 kW (3,300 hp); Malaysia models:3,300 hp (2,500 kW)(nominal),3,100 hp (2,300 kW)(site)
- Tractive effort
  - Starting: 517 kN (116,226.2 lbf)
Career
- Numbers: Germany:250 001-250 011; Malaysia: 26101-26120; Pakistan :6001-6030
- Nicknames: Blue Tiger
- Delivered: Malaysia:2003
- First run: Malaysia:2003

Blue Tiger (manufacturer designation: DE-AC33C) is a type of high powered diesel-electric locomotive developed by ADtranz in association with General Electric.

== History and design ==
The prototype was unveiled in 1996.

Initially the axle load was expected to be a light 18 tonnes (17.7 long tons; 19.8 short tons) and the power at ~2,500 kW (3,400 hp). In practice, the German locomotives had an axle load of 21 tonnes (20.7 long tons; 23.1 short tons) (which is normal for this type of diesel locomotive).

General Electric supplied diesel engines and electrical transmission system (which used IGBT-based inverters driving AC traction motors). The rest of the locomotive was built by AdTranz in Kassel.

For the Pakistan export models a 16-cylinder engine was used.

Bombardier took over AdTranz in 2001, subsequently the Blue Tiger locomotive was shown at InnoTrans in 2002 with a view to European orders. The German production models had a mass of 126 tonnes (124.0 long tons; 138.9 short tons) (axle load 21 tonnes or 20.7 long tons or 23.1 short tons) and an engine power of 2,430 kW (3,260 hp).

As of 2009, the class is no longer listed as a production model by Bombardier; GE also lists the family as a former production type. For the European market, Bombardier produces the less powerful diesel variants of the TRAXX family, whilst GE offers variants of its Evolution series for export.

== Operators ==
=== Pakistan ===
The first orders for the locomotives came from Pakistan Railways in the late 1990s. The locomotives were being built to a gauge of 1,676 mm (5 ft 6 in) and powered by a 16-cylinder engine of 3,300 horsepower (2,500 kW) instead of the 12-cylinder engine used in the prototype and other production models. The first ten were shipped out, the remainder assembled under license in Pakistan. Pakistan Locomotive Series Start From 6001 to 6030.

=== Malaysia ===
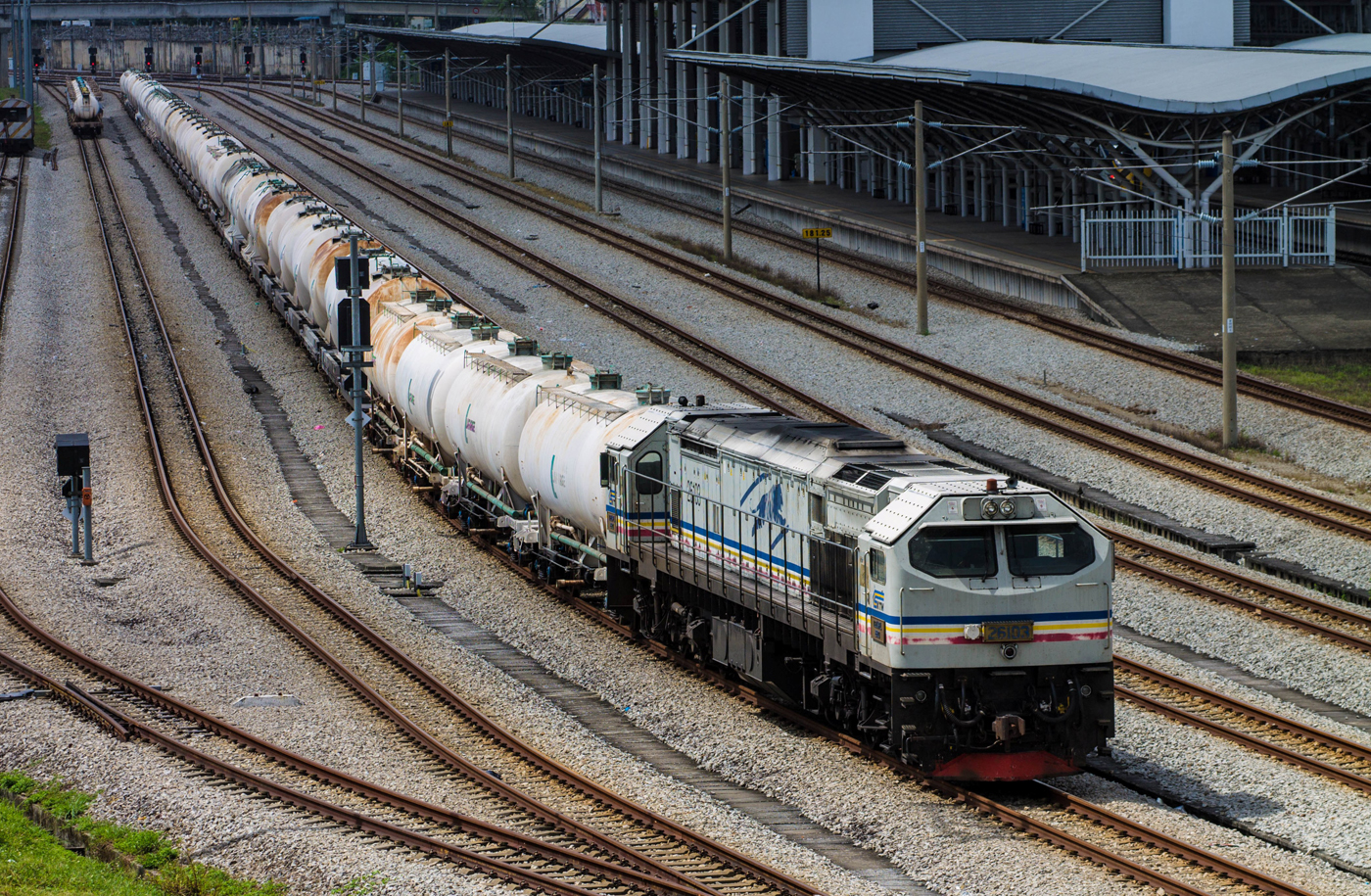
A KTMB Class 26 is resting with its cement train at Ipoh station.

Twenty locomotives were built to 1,000 mm (3 ft 3 3/8 in) gauge in 2003–2004 for KTM. They were designated as "Class 26" (Numbers: 26101 – 26120).

All the locomotives were named after capes in Malaysia. In the first decade of operations the locomotives proved more reliable than the Malaysian Class 29 locomotives bought at around the same time. One of the Class 26 locomotives, 26108 Tanjung Kupang was once droven by Ibrahim Iskandar of Johor, the current Yang di-Pertuan Agong.

=== Germany ===
10 Locomotives were built to 1,435 mm (4 ft 8 1/2 in) gauge with a view to leasing or orders.

Various companies have used the locomotives. Initially Karsdorfer Eisenbahngesellschaft GmbH (KEG) was to use 8 units, but went bankrupt in 2005. In 2006, the distribution was:

- Osthannoversche Eisenbahnen (5 units including the prototype)
- ITL Eisenbahngesellschaft (Import Transport Logistik) (2 units)
- Havelländische Eisenbahnen AG (4 units)

== Models ==
A working scale model of this locomotive has been produced by the Slovenian company Mehano in N, TT, and HO scale.
