= Harzbahn =

Harzbahn includes:

- Rübeland Railway (Rübelandbahn)
- Harz Narrow Gauge Railways
  - Harz Railway (Harzquerbahn)
  - Brocken Railway (Brockenbahn)
  - Selke Valley Railway (Selketalbahn)
- Wurmberg Gondola Lift
- Burgberg Cable Car
