= Drei Annen Hohne =

Settlement in Saxony-Anhalt, Germany

Coordinates: 51°46′15″N 10°43′38″E

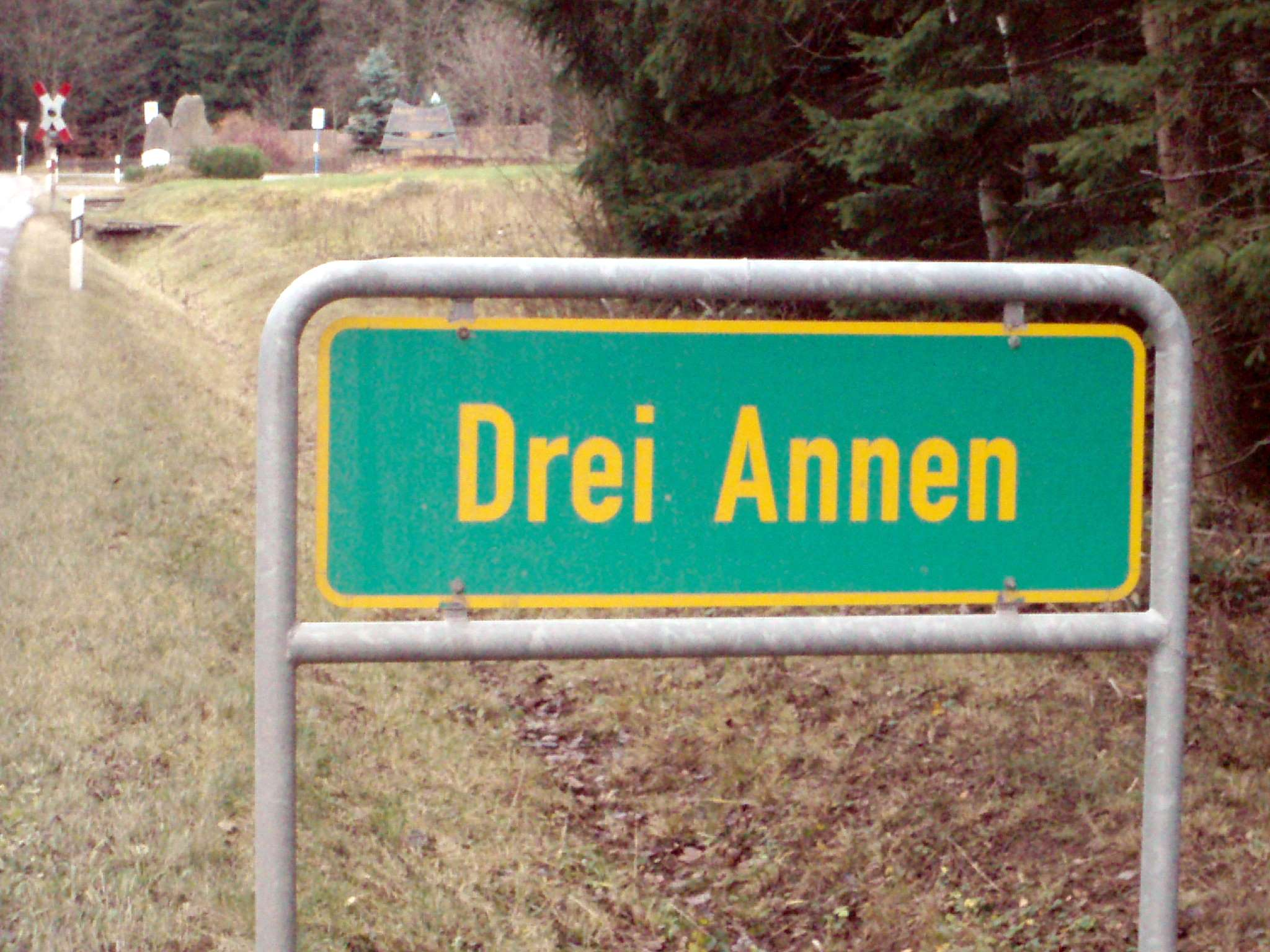
Drei Annen sign

Drei Annen Hohne is the name of a small settlement within the municipal area of Wernigerode in Saxony-Anhalt, Germany.

The place is located about 9 km (5.6 mi) southwest of the town within the Harz mountains, on the northeastern edge of the Harz National Park. It is accessible from the road from Wernigerode to Schierke, an eastern branch–off leads to Elbingerode. Drei Annen Hohne is also a stop on the narrow gauge Harz Railway line from Wernigerode to Nordhausen, as well as of the Brocken Railway, which branches off south of the station.

== History ==
The remarkable name Drei Annen ("Three Annes") was first mentioned in 1770, when the lord of the manor, Count Christian Frederick of Stolberg-Wernigerode sanctioned the mining of copper and silver at the place, reserving mine shares for himself and his mother Princess Christiane Anna of Anhalt-Köthen, his newborn daughter Anne, and his neonate niece Anna Emilia, daughter of his brother–in–law Prince Frederick Erdmann of Anhalt-Pless. The mining turned out to be unprofitable, and after several attempts, the adit was closed and instead a tavern was erected. When in 1871 Count Otto of Stolberg-Wernigerode had the road to Schierke rebuilt as a highway (the present-day Hagenstraße), the inn was enlarged as a toll station.

When on 20 June 1898 the first section of the Harz Railway from Wernigerode opened, the tracks ran right beside the Drei Annen highway inn, but the new station was established on a plateau about 1 km (600 ft) to the southwest near the comital forester's lodge at the Hohne rocks. It was initially called Signalfichte after a prominent spruce near the road, which however fell victim to a storm in October 1901, whereafter the railway station became known as Drei Annen Hohne, a name which was also adopted in the early 20th century by the small settlement next to the station where the present Kräuterhof hotel stands. From the 1950s the Drei Annen inn was run as a recreation home by the East German mechanical engineering combine at Magdeburg, it is today again a restaurant and a hotel.

== Hohne ==
On the way from the crossroads at Drei Annen Hohne station towards the Hohneklippen rocks there is a track branching off to the right after about 500 metres. After a few minutes walk, one arrives at a forester's lodge, Forsthaus Hohne and the HohneHof Nature Experience Centre (Natur-Erlebniszentrum HohneHof), one of several information centres in the Harz National Park. The name is derived from the nearby Hohneklippen. The HohneHof is checkpoint no. 174 in the Harzer Wandernadel hiking system.

== Sights ==
Worth seeing is the protected oak tree in a forest glade, used occasionally as a sheep pasture, west of the Glashütten Way and the Hohne forester's lodge, about 200 metres from the station as the crow flies. The mighty oak trunk has traces of fire on one side that it received at the end of the Second World War when a Tiger tank under the tree was blown up. The oak now stands in the centre of the new Dandelion Discovery Path (Löwenzahn-Entdeckerpfad) of the Harz National Park which winds its way through the woods and over the meadow here.

Also interesting is Drei Annen Hohne station, a railway junction for the Trans-Harz Railway and the Brocken Railway.

== Sources ==
- Dittmar Marquordt (1998), Fremdenverkehrsverein Bodfeld/Harz (ed.), "Ausflugtips: Drei Annen und Drei Annen Hohne", Neuer Harzbote (in German), no. 2, Elbingerode, p. 43
- Jörg Brückner (2000), "Endlich Klarheit über das Alter von Hohne. Über die Geschichte des Waldgebietes zwischen Wernigerode und dem Brocken", Neue Wernigeröder Zeitung (in German), vol. 11, no. 20, p. 22
