= Schierke station =

Railway station in Wernigerode, Germany

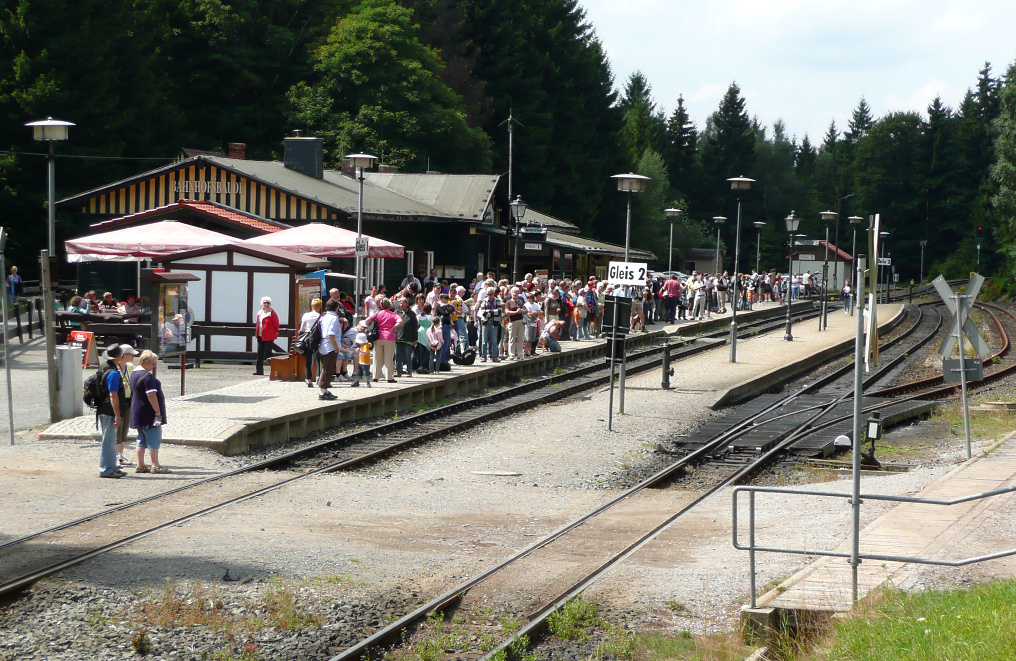
- Schierke station

General information
- Other names: Bahnhof Schierke
- Location: Schierke; Germany
- Coordinates: 51°45′54″N 10°40′40″E
- System: Through station
- Line: Brocken Railway
- Platforms: 2

Other information
- Station code: LSCR

History
- Opened: 1898
Location
- Location within Saxony-Anhalt

Schierke station (German: Bahnhof Schierke) is the railway station in the village of Schierke operated by the Harz Narrow Gauge Railways on the Brocken Railway in the Harz Mountains of central Germany. Schierke itself lies as the foot of the highest mountain in the Harz, the Brocken, and is located in the borough of Wernigerode in the federal state of Saxony-Anhalt.

== History ==
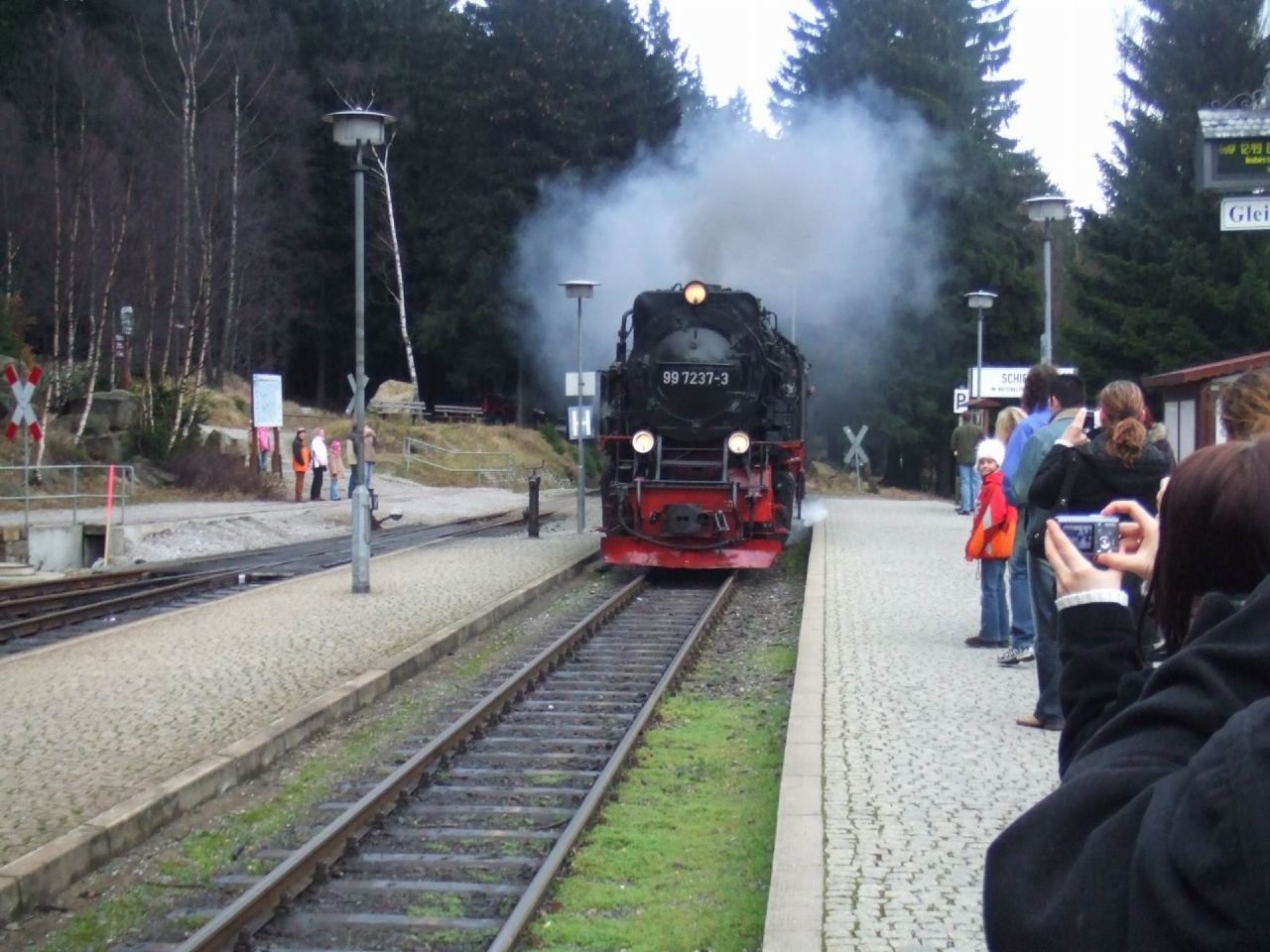
Arrival of a steam loco at the station

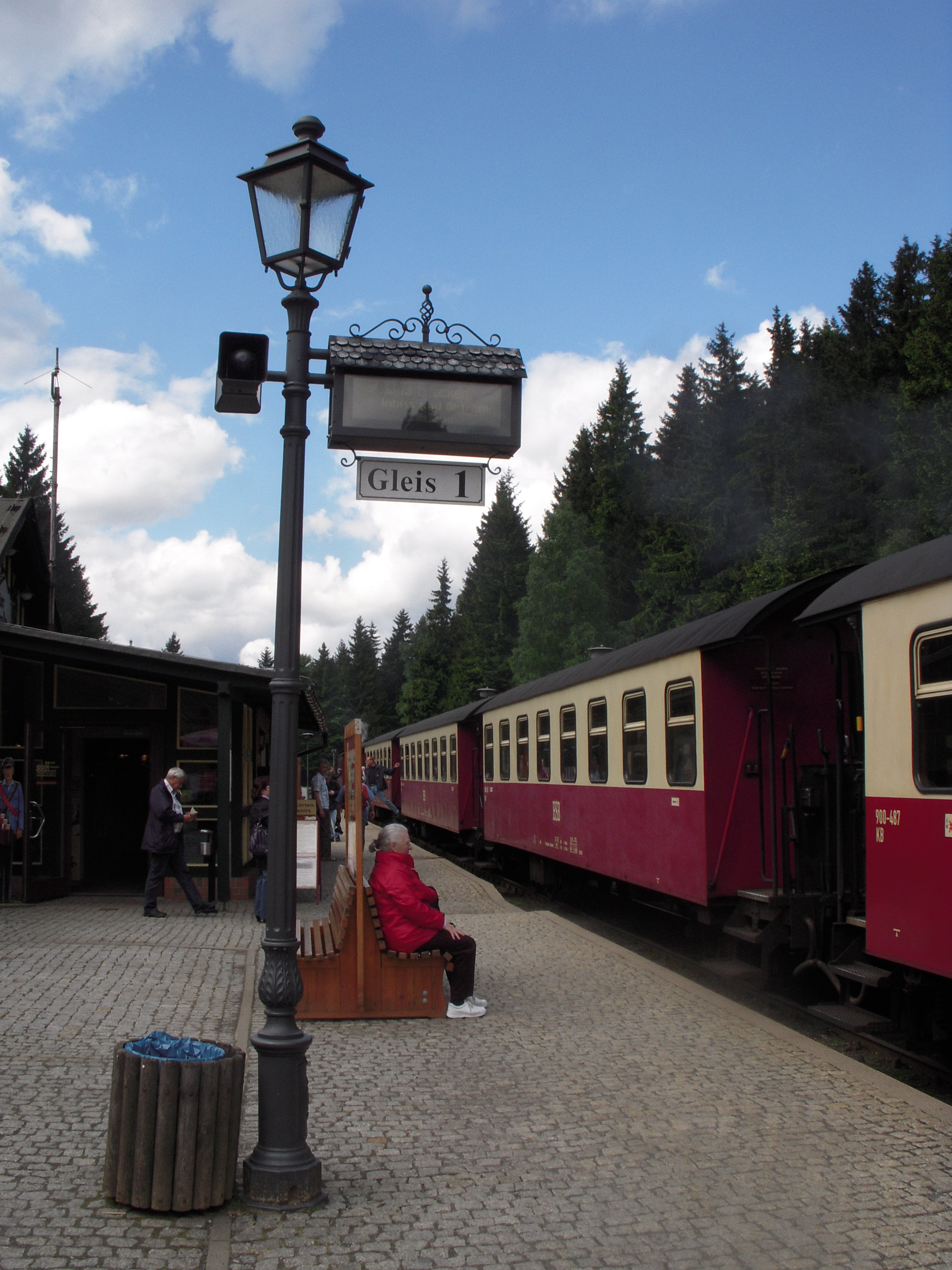
Schierke Station

The station, which is located at a height of 687 metres above sea level, was opened on 20 June 1898 and has been in continuous use as a railway station ever since. On the completion of the line up to the Brocken on 4 October 1898, trains to the highest mountain in North Germany, which were predominantly used by tourists, called at Schierke station. Because Brocken station was not served in winter due to heavy snowfalls, trains always terminated in Schierke from 16 October to 29 April. Not until the German Winter Sports Championships in spring 1950 did trains run to the Brocken in winter as well.

As a result of the location of the Brocken in the border zone between the GDR and FRG the Brocken Railway section between Schierke and Brocken station was closed to the public from 13 August 1961. Railway and station were then only used for military purposes or by the local population. After the Wende - the political changes in 1989 - the Brocken line was inspected and repaired, and Schierke station used for its original purpose again.

== Location and facilities ==
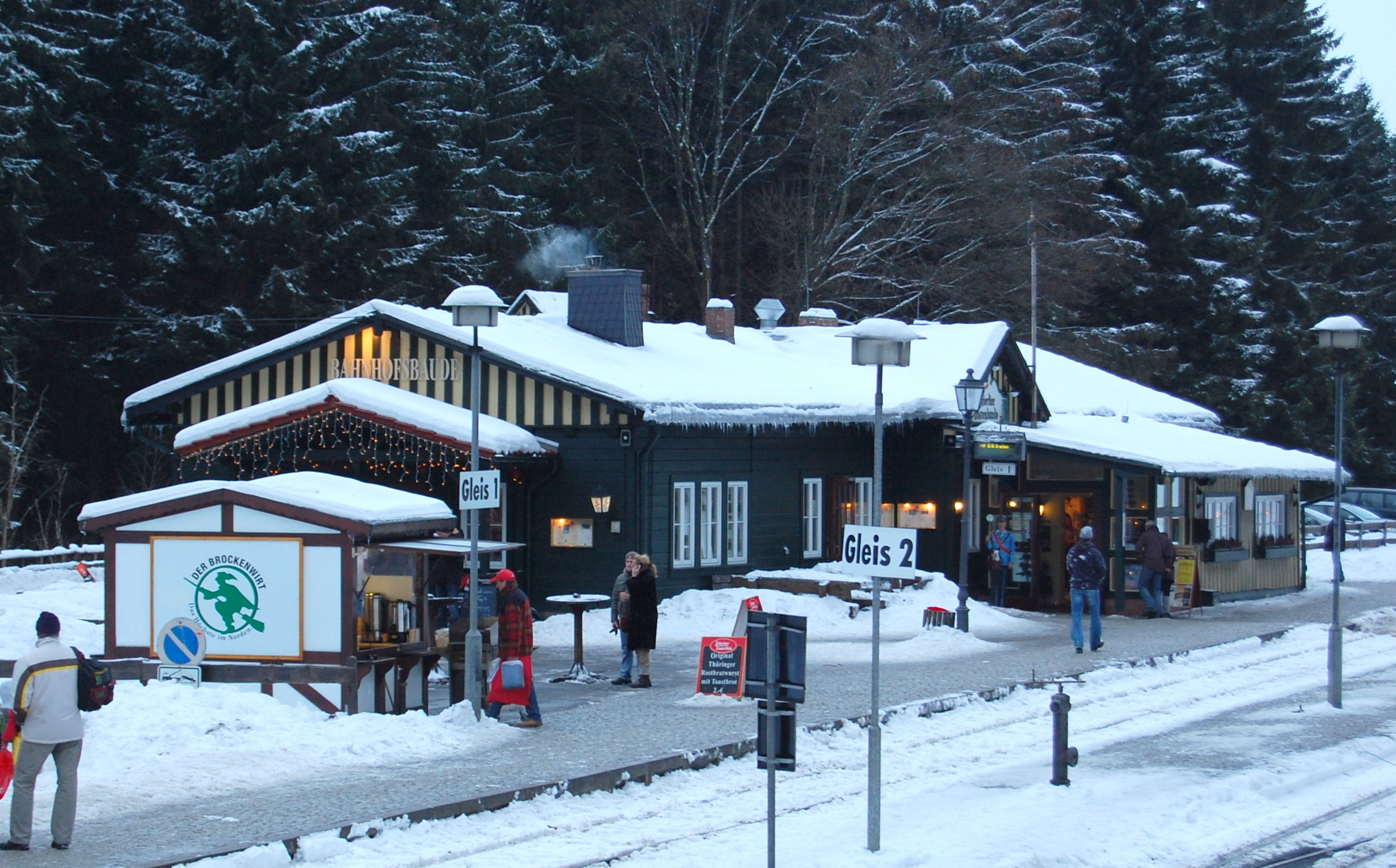
Schierke station in winter

The station lies just above the village of Schierke on the territory of the Harz National Park. Its approach roads are closed to private motor vehicles. Taxis, delivery vehicles and vehicles with special permission, such as e.g. for guests of the Brocken Hotel are excepted, but may not drive right up to the station. In the station building there is a restaurant and a ticket and souvenir shop run by the Harz Narrow Gauge Railways. In the station yard there is a mobile take-away stall. The station is only regularly worked by steam-headed trains of the Harz Narrow Gauge Railways. A little to the north is the rock formation of the Feuersteinklippe.
