= Drei Annen Hohne station =

Railway station in Wernigerode, Germany

Drei Annen Hohne
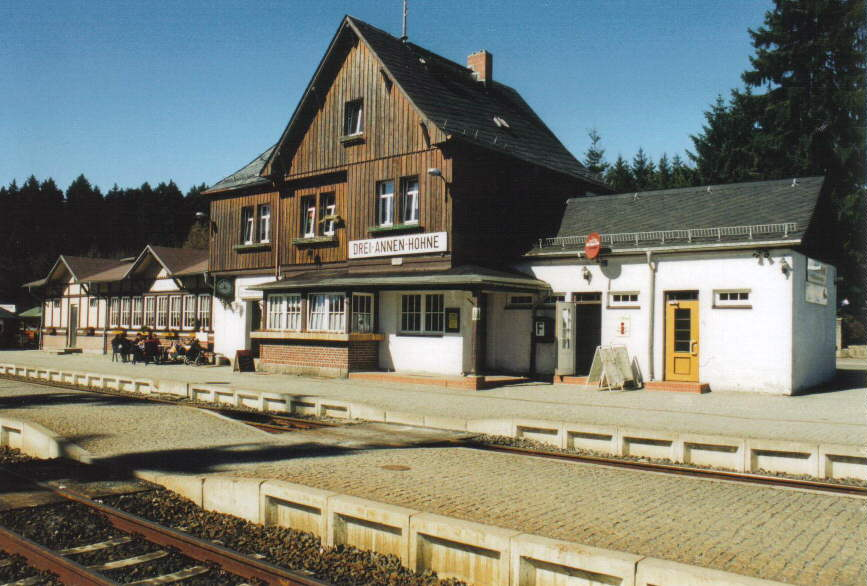
- View of the station building

General information
- Location: Wernigerode, Saxony-Anhalt; Germany
- Coordinates: 51°46′14″N 10°43′37″E
- System: Through station
- Lines: Harz Railway (KBS 326); Brocken Railway (KBS 325); former Elbingerode–Drei Annen Hohne
- Platforms: 4

Construction
- Architectural style: Timber-framed

Other information
- Station code: n/a
- DS100 code: LDAH

History
- Opened: 1898
Location
- Location within Saxony-Anhalt

Drei Annen Hohne station is a branch-off station on the Harz Railway and the Brocken Railway.

== History ==
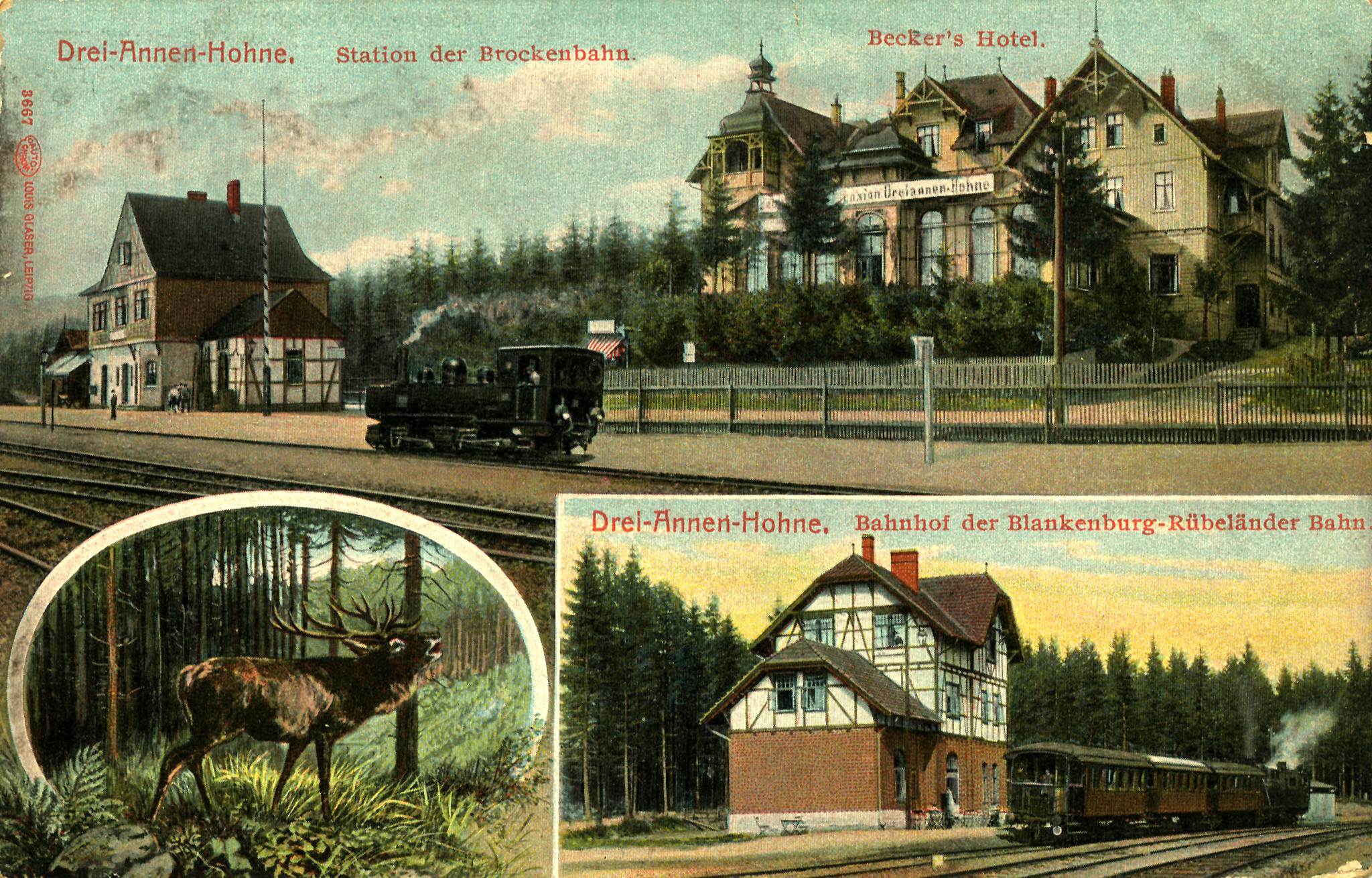
The "upper" and "lower" Drei Annen Hohne stations, in or after 1907

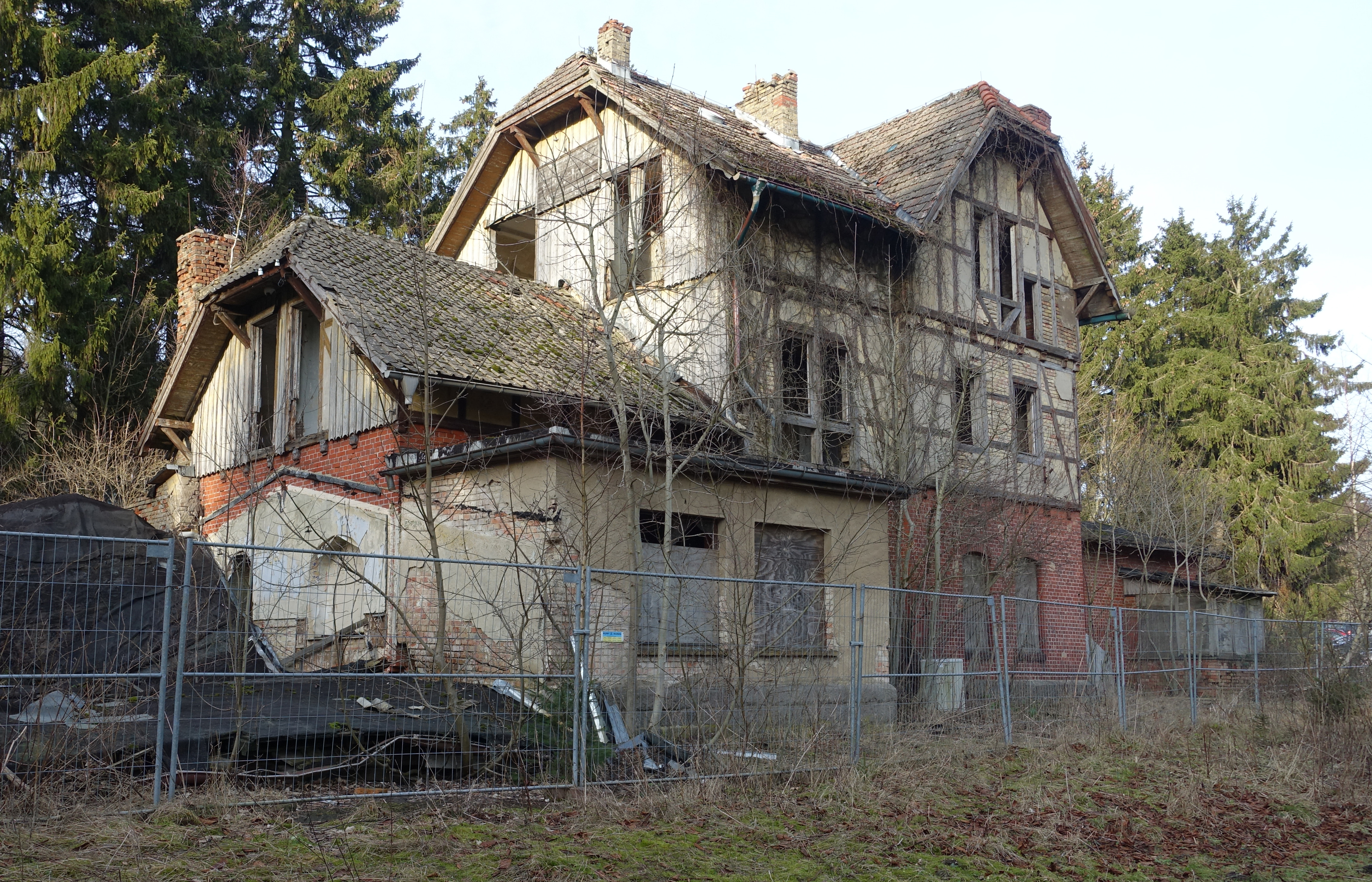
The derelict Drei Annen Hohne "lower", terminus, station in February 2016.

The upper station was built in 1898 by the Nordhausen-Wernigerode Railway Company after the completion of the Harz Railway and initially bore the name Signalfichte, then Signalfichte-Hohne. After a storm blew down the Signalfichte (a prominent "signal spruce" tree) in October 1901, the names of two hamlets in the vicinity were joined to make the new station name.

For the standard gauge railway line to Elbingerode a separate station was opened on 1 May 1907 south of the Harz Railway station and called the Lower Station (Untere Bahnhof). It was built by the Halberstadt-Blankenburg Railway. The two stations were linked by an underpass for pedestrians. This line was closed on 1 December 1965. The surviving railway embankment is used in places as a cycle path. Until 1947 both stations were in the borough of Elbingerode. Railway line and stations were then exchanged for the forest settlement of Büchenberg that belonged to Wernigerode. The Lower Station has fallen into disrepair since the line closure, after having been used for a period as a Mitropa restaurant.

In the year the station on the Harz Railway was built, a hotel appeared opposite it to the north, that was called Beckers Hotel until it was sold in 1940. After 1945 it was owned by the Interior Ministry. Since the Wende it has been once more in private hands and is now called the Kräuterhof.

The name of the station was later transferred to the small settlement of Drei Annen Hohne that is situated around the station.
