= South Harz Railway Company =

Railway company on Germany

Walkenried–Braunlage–Tanne

Service
- Route number: former 200 f (1962)

Technical
- Track gauge: 1000 mm
- Minimum radius: 60
- Maximum incline: 4,0 %

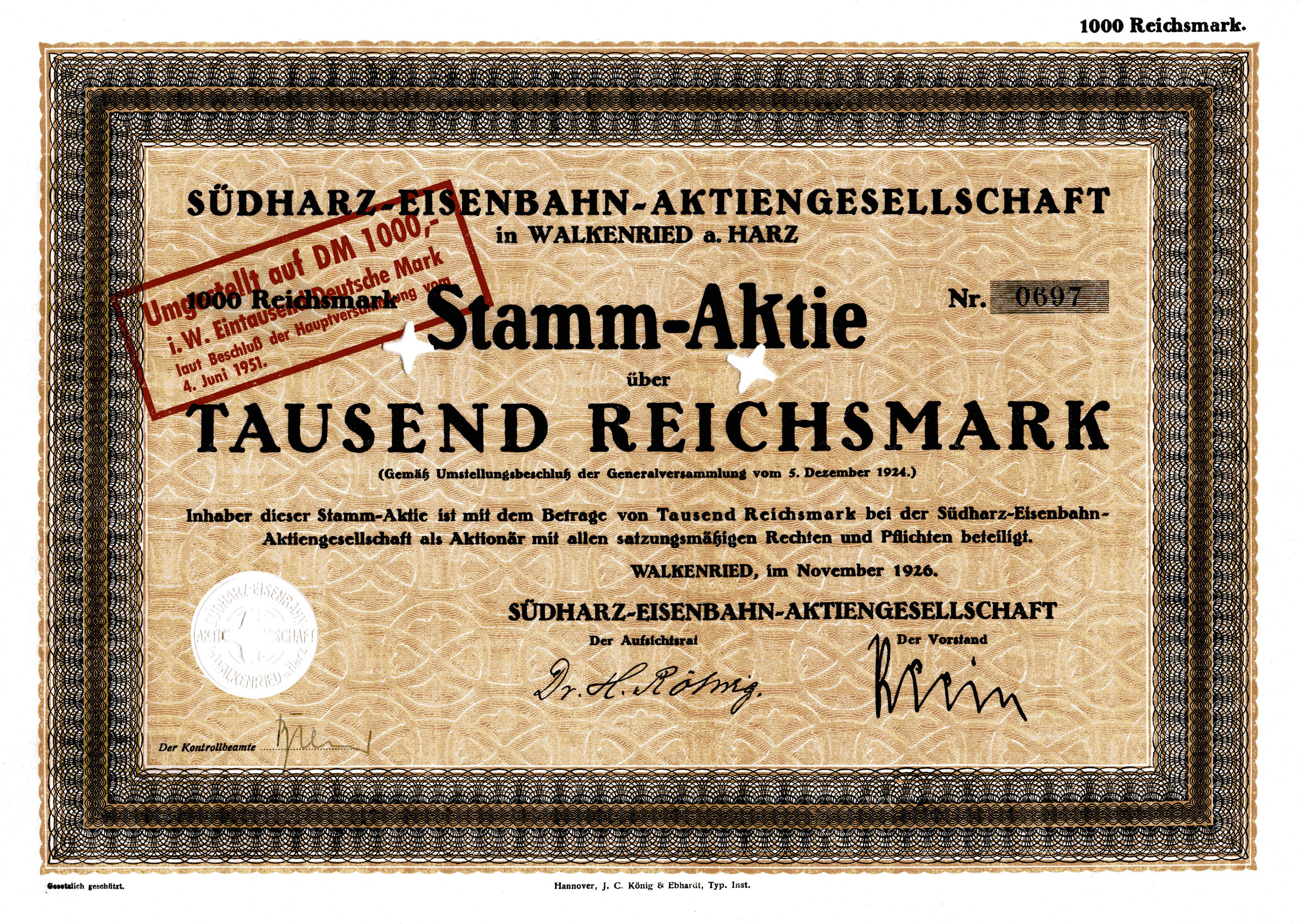
Share of the South Harz Railway Company, issued November 1926

The South Harz Railway Company (German: Südharz-Eisenbahn-Gesellschaft) or SHE was founded in 1897 and, on 15 August 1899, opened a 24 km long, winding and hilly, metre gauge railway from Walkenried via Wieda and Brunnenbachsmühle to Braunlage in the Harz Mountains of central Germany. On 1 November 1899 a 3 km extension for goods trains was opened to the Wurmberg mountain.

From 24 August 1899 an 8 km line branched off in Brunnenbachsmühle that ran through Sorge to Tanne. It provided a link with the Harz Railway operated by the Nordhausen-Wernigerode Railway Company and the Harz line run by the Halberstadt-Blankenburg Railway. This branch was cut in 1945 by the border zone and services were interrupted.

The "main branch" was worked by passenger trains and railbuses until 30 September 1962. Goods trains stopped running on 3 August 1963; the Wurmberg line had not been worked since 1958. Its operator was the Hermann Bachstein Central Office for Branch Lines (Centralverwaltung für Secundairbahnen Herrmann Bachstein), which had purchased the majority of shares in the South Harz Railway Company shortly after its foundation and which was turned into a public limited company (GmbH) in 1965.

== Sources ==
- Manfred Bornemann: Die Südharz-Eisenbahn. Verlag Ed. Piepersche Druckerei, Clausthal-Zellerfeld 1981
- Gerhard Zieglgänsberger, Hans Röper: Die Harzer Schmalspurbahnen. Transpress Verlag, Stuttgart 1999, ISBN 3-613-71103-6
- Wínfried Dörner: Die Südharz-Eisenbahn – eine Region und ihre Eisenbahn. Papierflieger Druck und Verlag, Clausthal-Zellerfeld 2007, ISBN 978-3-89720-929-9
