= Brocken station =

Railway station on the summit of the Brocken, Germany

Coordinates: 51°48′00″N 10°37′04″E

Brocken
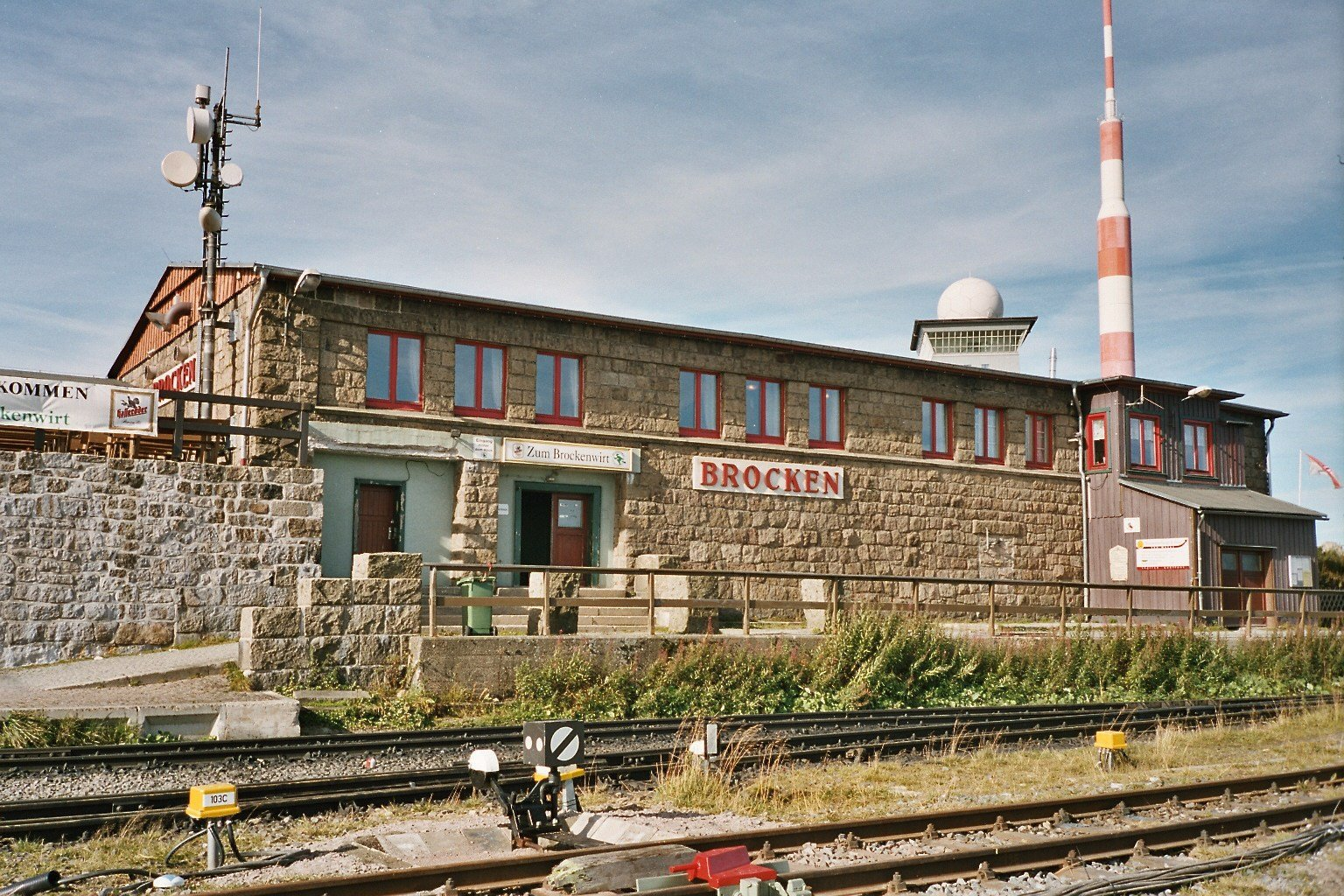
- Brocken station

General information
- Location: Wernigerode; Germany
- Elevation: 1,125 m (3,691 ft)
- System: Terminal station
- Owner: Harzer Schmalspurbahnen (HSB)
- Operator: Harzer Schmalspurbahnen (HSB)
- Line: Brocken Railway

Other information
- Station code: LBRO

History
- Opened: 1898
Location
- Location within Saxony-Anhalt Location within Germany Location within Europe

Brocken station (German: Bahnhof Brocken) is the terminus on the summit of the Brocken, the highest mountain in the Harz, in central Germany. It lies in the state of Saxony-Anhalt and is the end point of the Brocken Railway, operated by the Harz Narrow Gauge Railways.

== Location ==
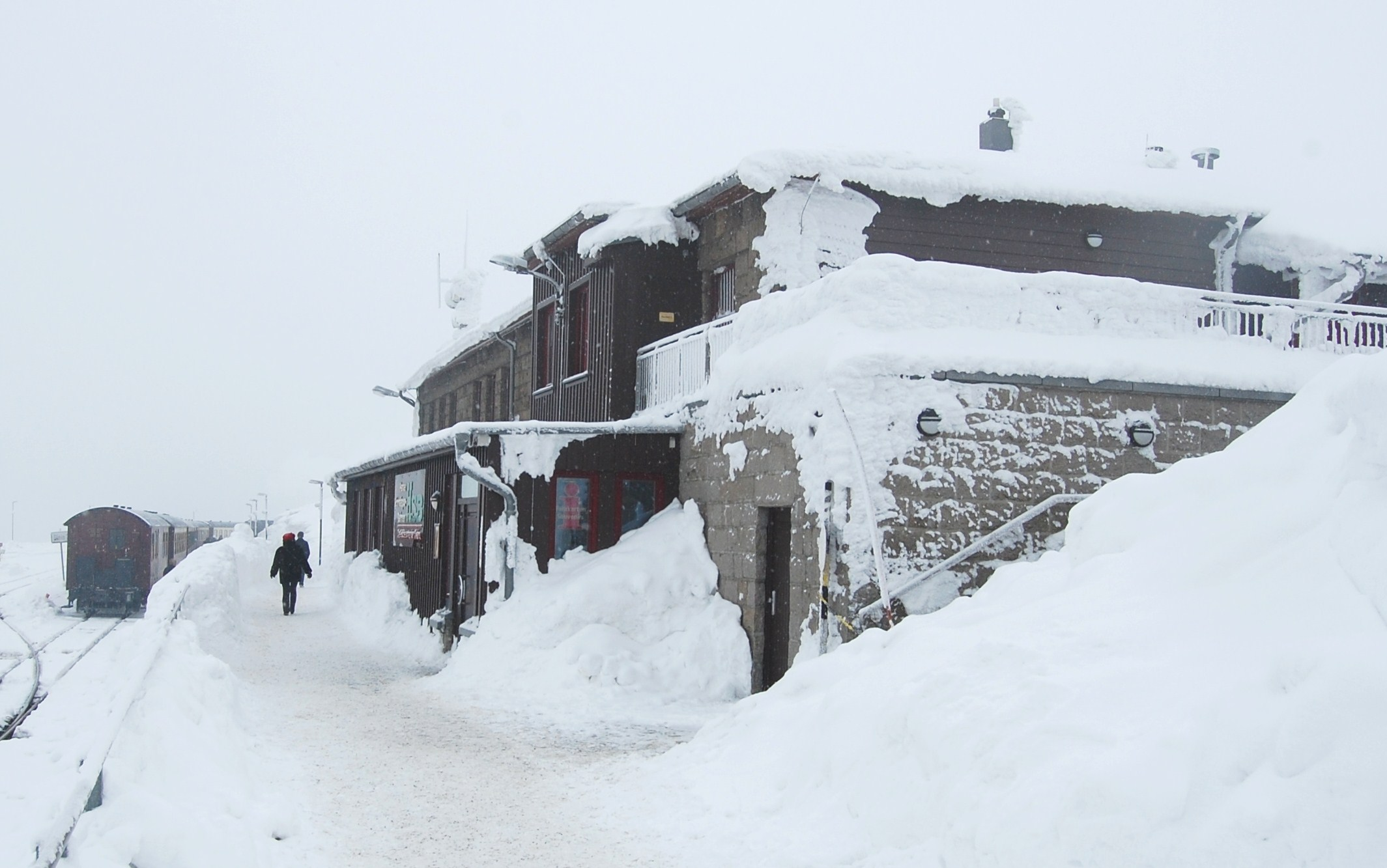
Brocken station in winter

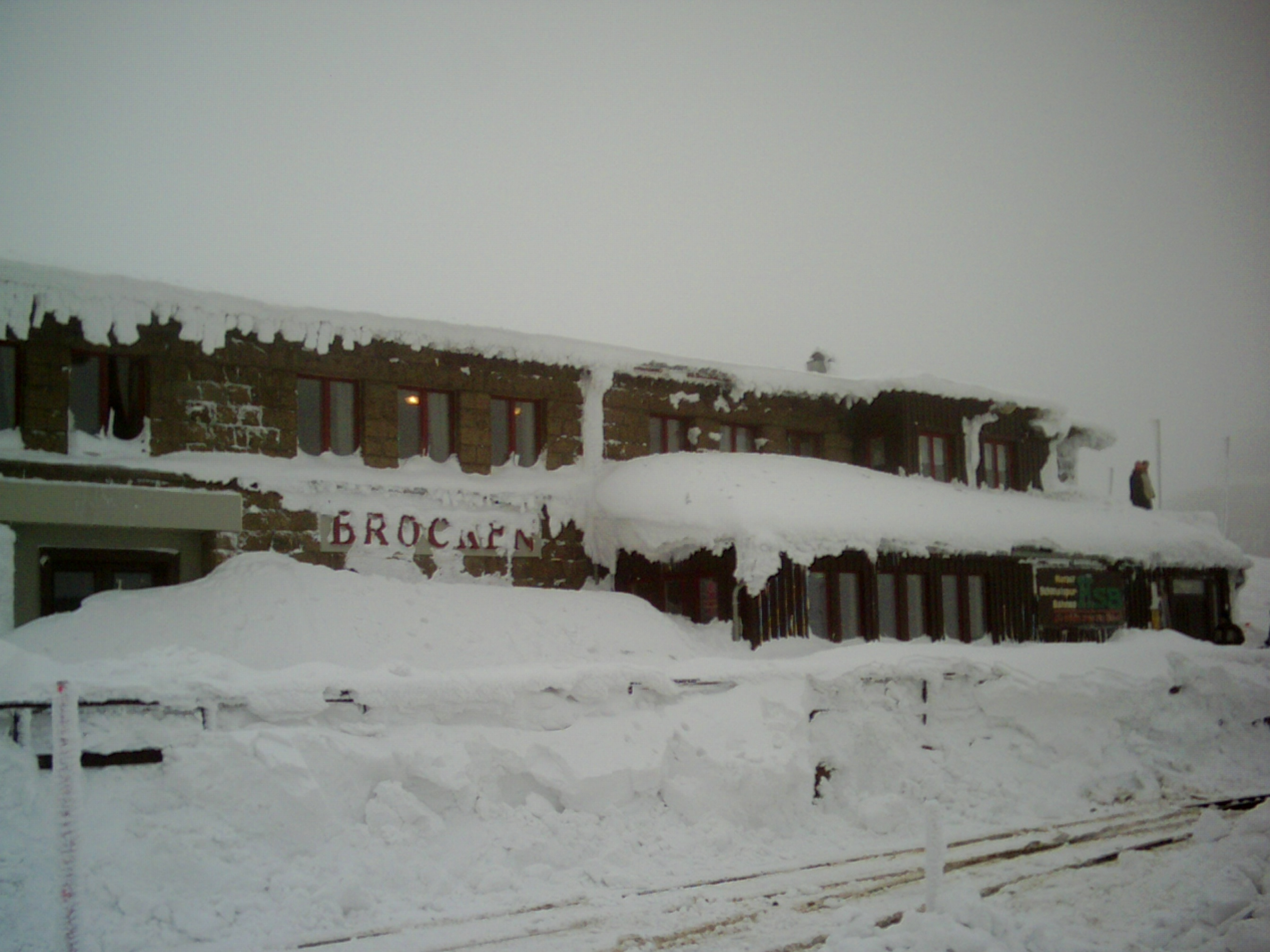
A snow-covered Brocken station

The railway station, also known in German as the Brockenbahnhof, lies only a few metres below the summit of the Brocken, at a height of 1,125 m (3,691 ft). It is the highest railway station in Germany, that is served by a railway without a rack system.

== History ==
The line to the Brocken was opened on 4 October 1898. The present station building was built in 1924 of granite. Initially, trains only ran during the summer months, due to the harsh winter weather conditions. Following the destruction in the final days of the Second World War, the line to the Brocken was closed and only reopened again on 14 May 1949. From 1950, the station was also served in the winter. At that time, the station was very busy. In July 1960, it received 90,000 passengers.

With the construction of border defences between East and West Germanies that ran close to the Brocken, public train services to the mountain ended on 13 August 1961. Brocken station acted as accommodation for the Border Troops of the GDR. In the period to 1987, only a few materiel goods trains called at the station. After the political changes following the fall of the Berlin Wall, the Brocken Railway was reopened in 1991 and Brocken station was once again used as a railway station.

== Facilities ==
A restaurant, ticket office and souvenir shop for the Harz Narrow Gauge Railway are located in the station building. The station is, currently, only served by scheduled services, by the steam-hauled trains of the Harz Narrow Gauge Railway and is, primarily, a tourist facility.
