= Harz Railway =

Railway line in Germany

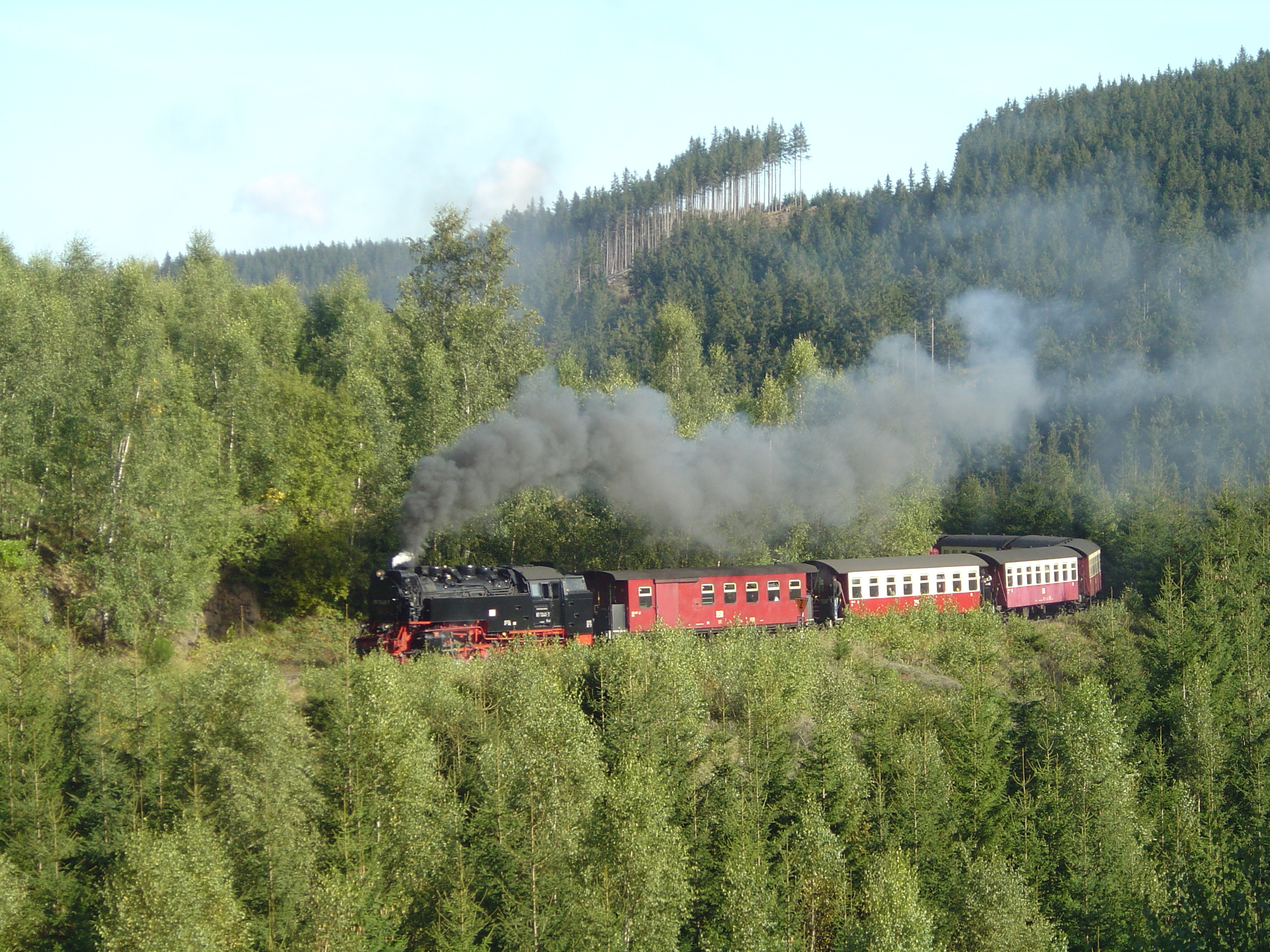
- Train heading towards the Brocken on the Trans-Harz Railway near Drei Annen Hohne

Overview
- Native name: Harzquerbahn
- Line number: 9700
- Locale: Saxony-Anhalt, Thuringia, Germany
- Termini: Nordhausen; Wernigerode

Service
- Route number: 326 Nordhausen–Drei Annen Hohne; 325 Drei Annen Hohne–Wernigerode

Technical
- Line length: 60.5 km (37.6 mi)
- Track gauge: 1,000 mm (3 ft 3 3/8 in) metre gauge
- Minimum radius: 42 m (137.8 ft)
- Operating speed: 40 km/h (24.9 mph) (maximum)
- Maximum incline: 3.3%
Route map
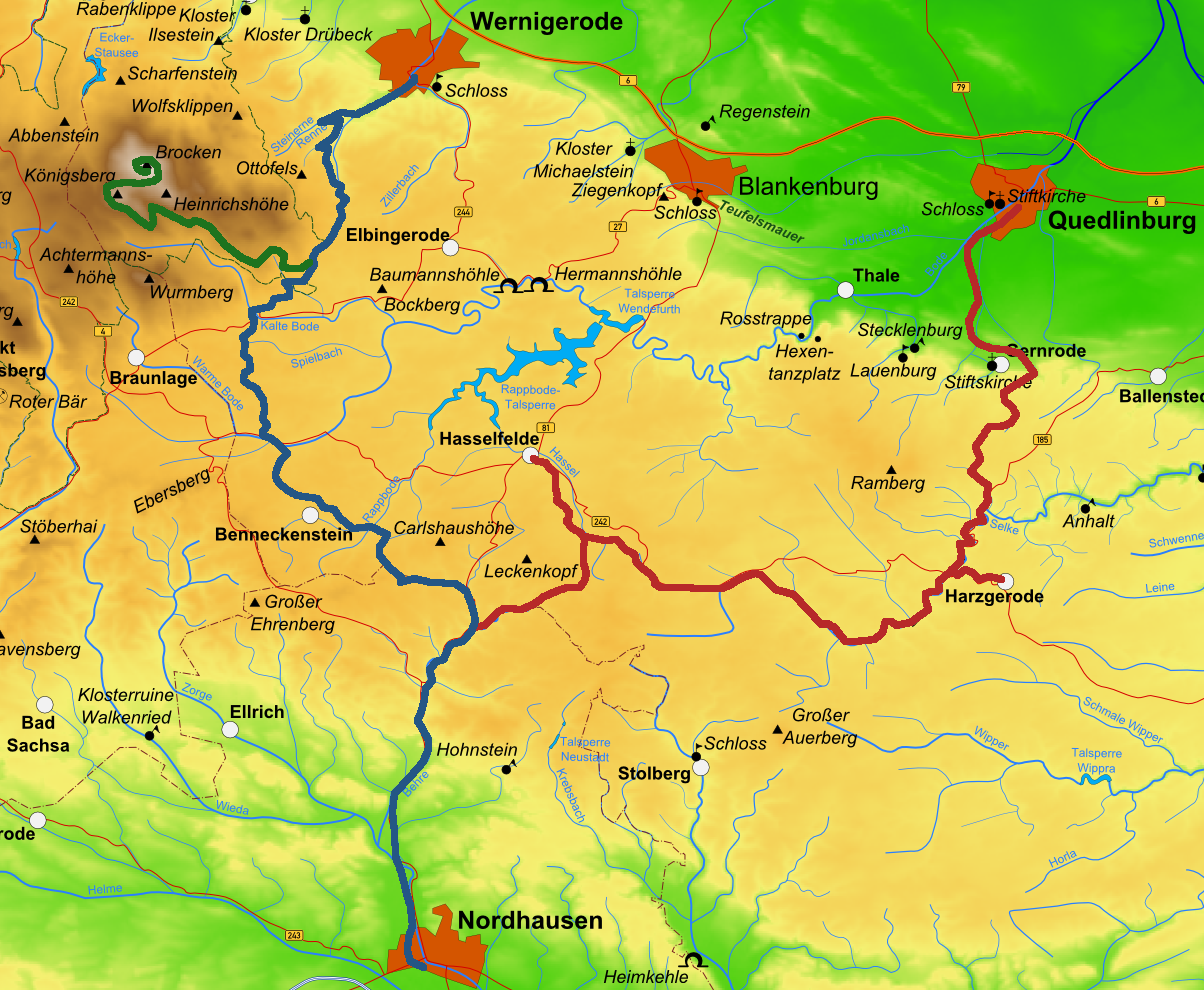
The Harz Railway is shown in blue as part of the HSB network
- Source: German railway atlas

The Harz Railway or Trans-Harz Railway (German: Harzquerbahn) was formerly the main line of the Harz Narrow Gauge Railways (Harzer Schmalspurbahnen or HSB) and runs north to south right across the Harz Mountains from Wernigerode to Nordhausen. However, the tourist attraction of the Brocken, the highest mountain in the Harz, is so great that the Brocken Railway is effectively the main line today. The Trans-Harz Railway joins up with the Selke Valley Railway to Quedlinburg at Eisfelder Talmühle where all trains are organised to make good connections.

== Route ==
The line begins at the HSB's narrow gauge station in Nordhausen (Nordhausen Nord). It lies in northwest of and parallel to the standard gauge railway station. After passing the link line to the Nordhausen Tramway that joins it from the right, the railway bends towards the north and runs for 7 km (4.3 mi) to the station of Niedersachswerfen Ost almost parallel to the standard gauge line from Nordhausen to Ellrich (the South Harz Line). The Harz mountains begin beyond Ilfeld (km 10.7). Behind Netzkater (km 14.0) lies the station of Eisfelder Talmühle (km 17.3), where the Selke Valley Railway branches off in a curve to the right.

The Trans-Harz Railway continues to follow the B 81 federal road as far as Tiefenbachmühle halt (km 19.5) before turning in a westerly direction in order to reach the request stop of Sophienhof (km 21.0), the last stop in Thuringia. The line runs through spruce forests over the state border with Saxony-Anhalt. At Benneckenstein station (km 29.8) the line crosses the ridge at 530 m above NN, its highest point so far. It then runs downhill into the valley of the Warme Bode, where the halt of Sorge (km 33.4; 449 m above NN) is located. Next the route climbs to its next summit at 557 m (1,827 ft). After Elend (km 41.6) the line reaches the junction with the Brocken Railway at Drei-Annen-Hohne station (km 46.4). In 2009 the construction of a new stub line from Elend to Braunlage was discussed (see South Harz Railway Company).

Behind Drei-Annen-Hohne the line runs steeply downhill and the railway reaches the 58 m (190.3 ft) long tunnel below the Thumkuhlenkopf. It is the only tunnel in the Harz Narrow Gauge Railway network. On emerging from the tunnel Wernigerode Castle can soon be seen in the distance. In the vicinity of the station at Steinerne Renne (km 54.5) the line enters one of the HSB's tightest curves with a 60 m (196.9 ft) radius, before reaching the station of Wernigerode-Hasserode (km 56.3). The next stations en route are Hochschule Harz halt (formerly Wernigerode-Kirchstraße) and Westerntor station (where the Wernigerode-Westerntor Bahnbetriebswerk is found) at Wernigerode. Its terminus is the station at Wernigerode (km 60.5).

== History ==
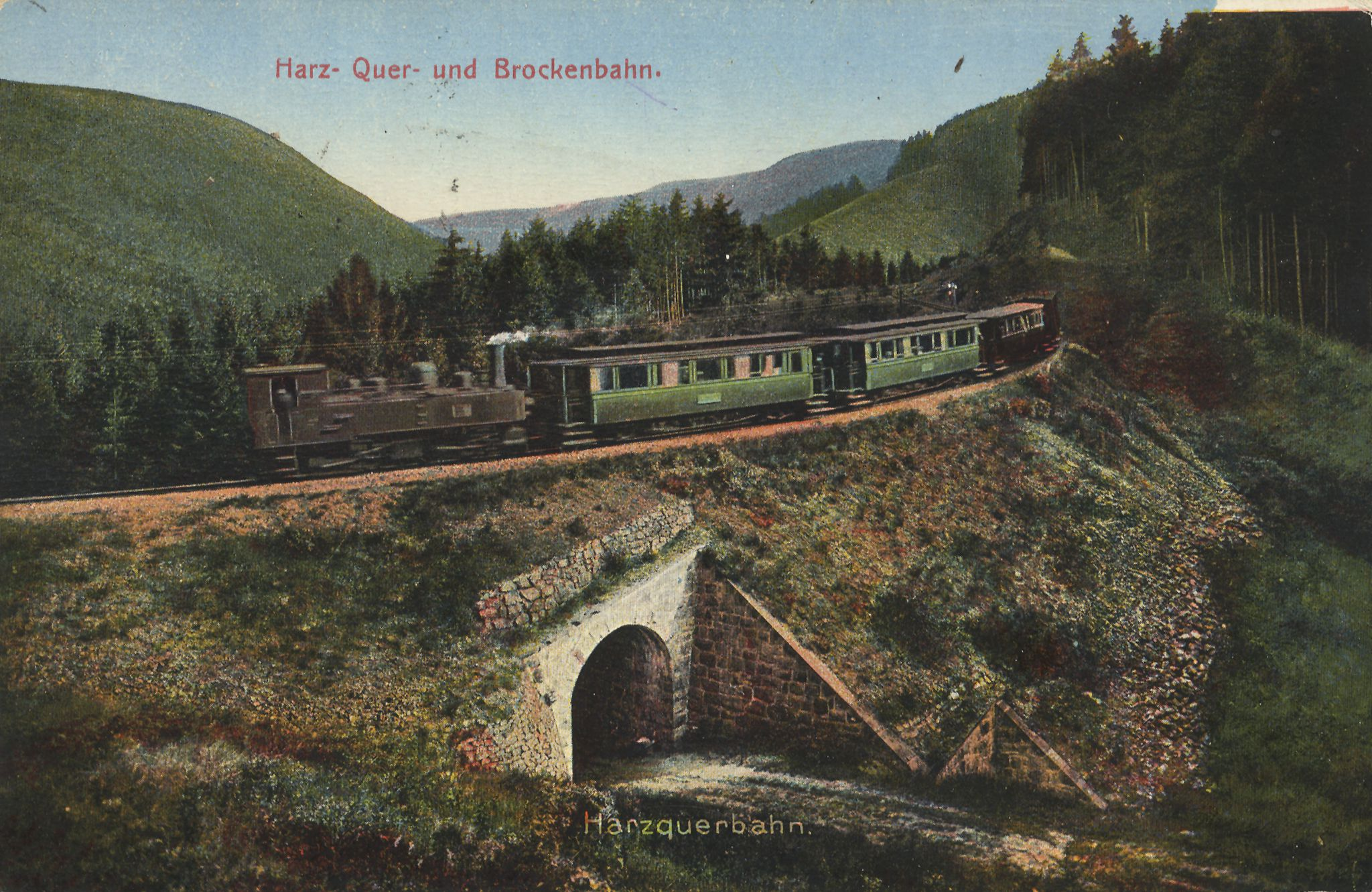
The Trans-Harz Railway around 1900

The first section of the Trans-Harz Railway to go into service was the line from Nordhausen to Ilfeld on 12 July 1897. On 7 February 1898 it was extended as far as Netzkater and on 15 September that year to Benneckenstein. From the north the section Wernigerode to Drei-Annen-Hohne was completed on 20 June 1898. The remaining section between Drei-Annen-Hohne and Benneckenstein was finally opened on 27 March 1899 along with the line up to the Brocken, the highest peak in the Harz mountains. The original operating company was the Nordhausen-Wernigerode Railway Company. After the compulsory acquisition of the line in 1949, the East German Deutsche Reichsbahn ran it until 1993.

From 1899 the Trans-Harz Railway crossed another metre gauge line at Sorge. This other line was operated by the South Harz Railway Company (SHE) and ran from Walkenried via Brunnenbachsmühle and Sorge to Tanne. A link line, initially just for passenger trains, was laid in 1913. In 1945 services between Sorge and Brunnenbachsmühle were closed, because this section crossed the Inner German Border. The section from Sorge to Tanne continued to be worked until 1958. The tracks were left on the border bridge until the fall of the Berlin Wall in 1989.

== Operations ==
Railway traffic has sharply increased in recent years on the section between Nordhausen and Ilfeld. Since 2004 Nordhausen hybrid-trams have run directly from Ilfeld into the tram network at Nordhausen. Other trains run to Eisfelder Talmühle and continue onto the Selke Valley Railway. Apart from one pair of steam trains, all services are worked by diesel railbuses. The only remaining goods trains on the Harz Narrow Gauge Railways work the line between Nordhausen and Eisfelder Talmühle. These regularly transport standard gauge ballast wagons from the Hartsteinwerken Unterberg on rollbocks to Nordhausen. A number of converted diesel locomotives are available for this, which have couplers and buffers at the right height for handling standard gauge goods wagons.

After 1993, daily services between Eisfelder Talmühle and Drei-Annen-Hohne were restricted to four pairs of trains. Only two pairs were hauled by steam locomotives. In addition, between Drei Annen Hohne and Wernigerode through trains run on the Brocken–Wernigerode route, the majority being steam-hauled.

== Gallery ==
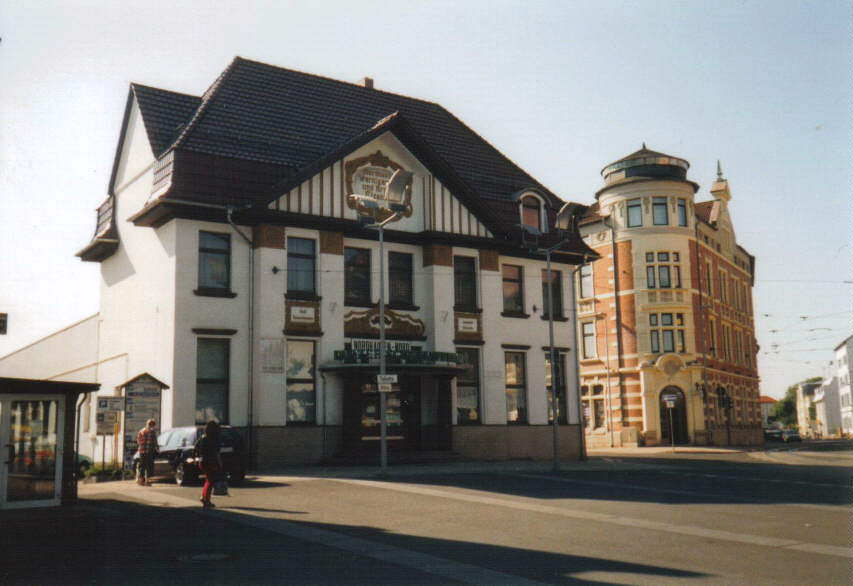
The station building at Nordhausen Nord

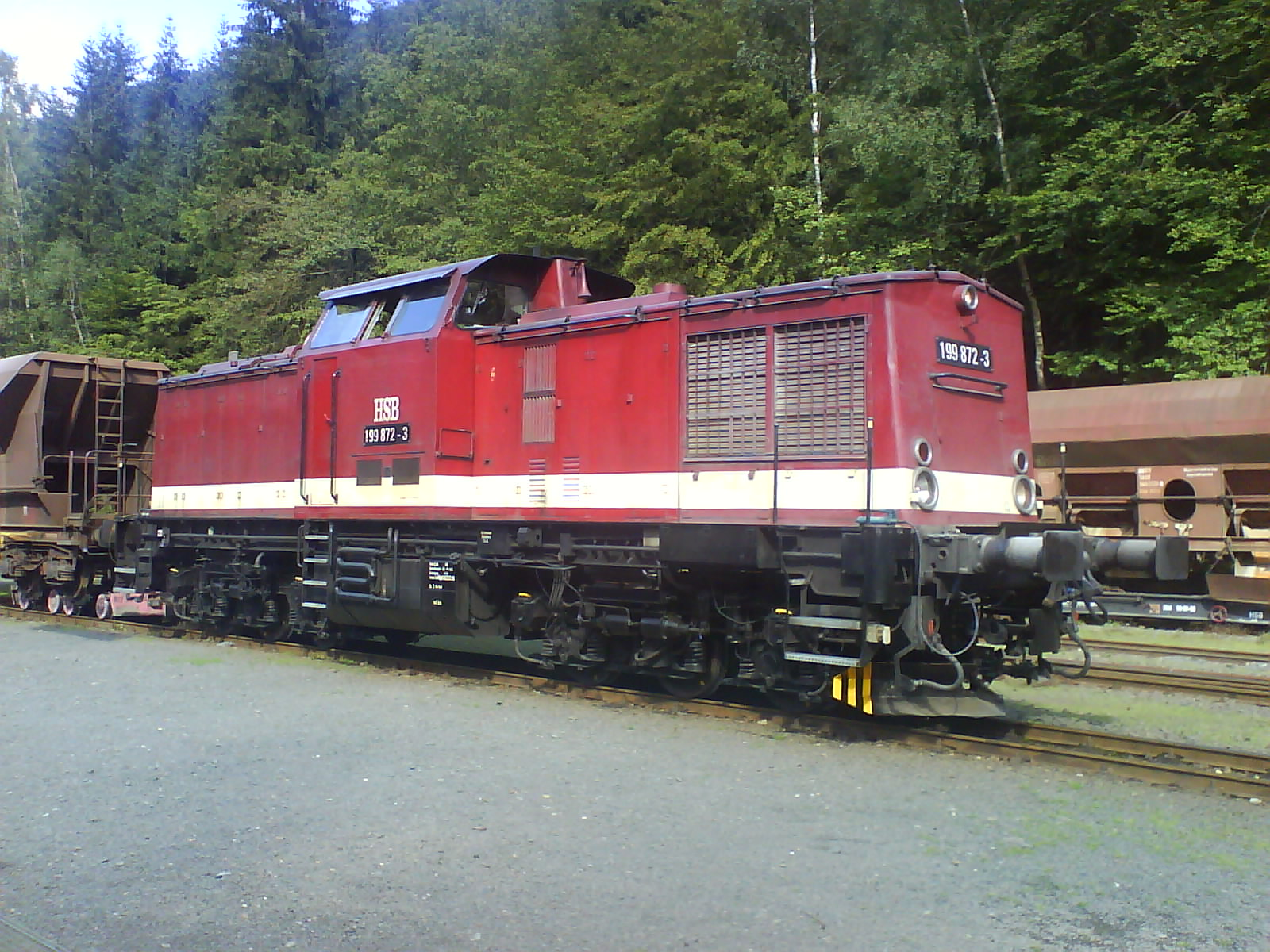
No. 199 872-3 in Eisfelder Talmühle

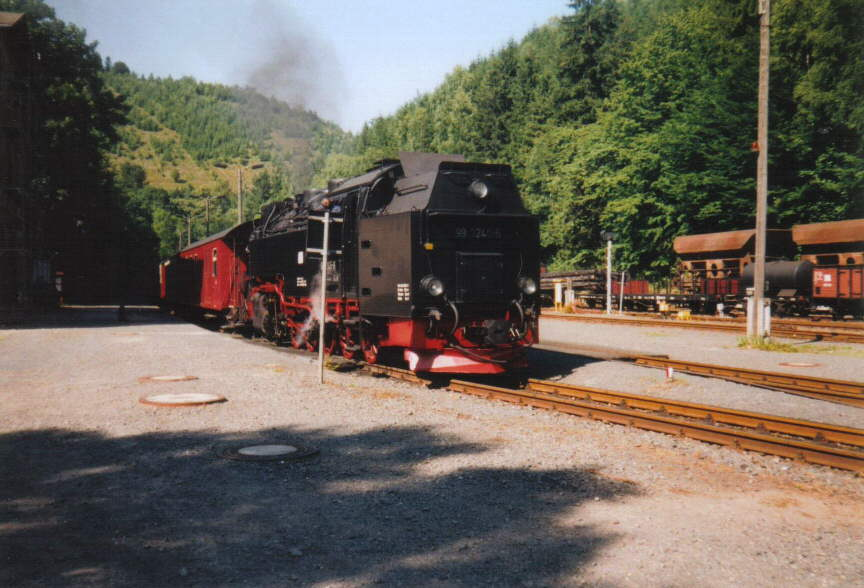
No. 99 7245 in Eisfelder Talmühle

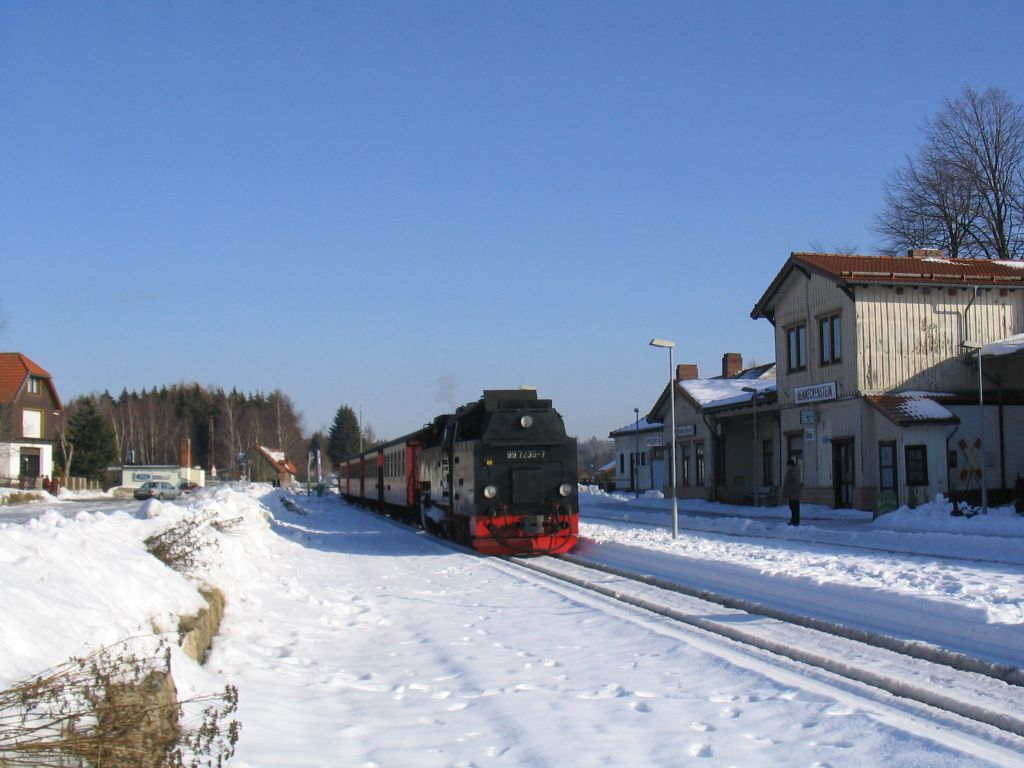
Benneckenstein station

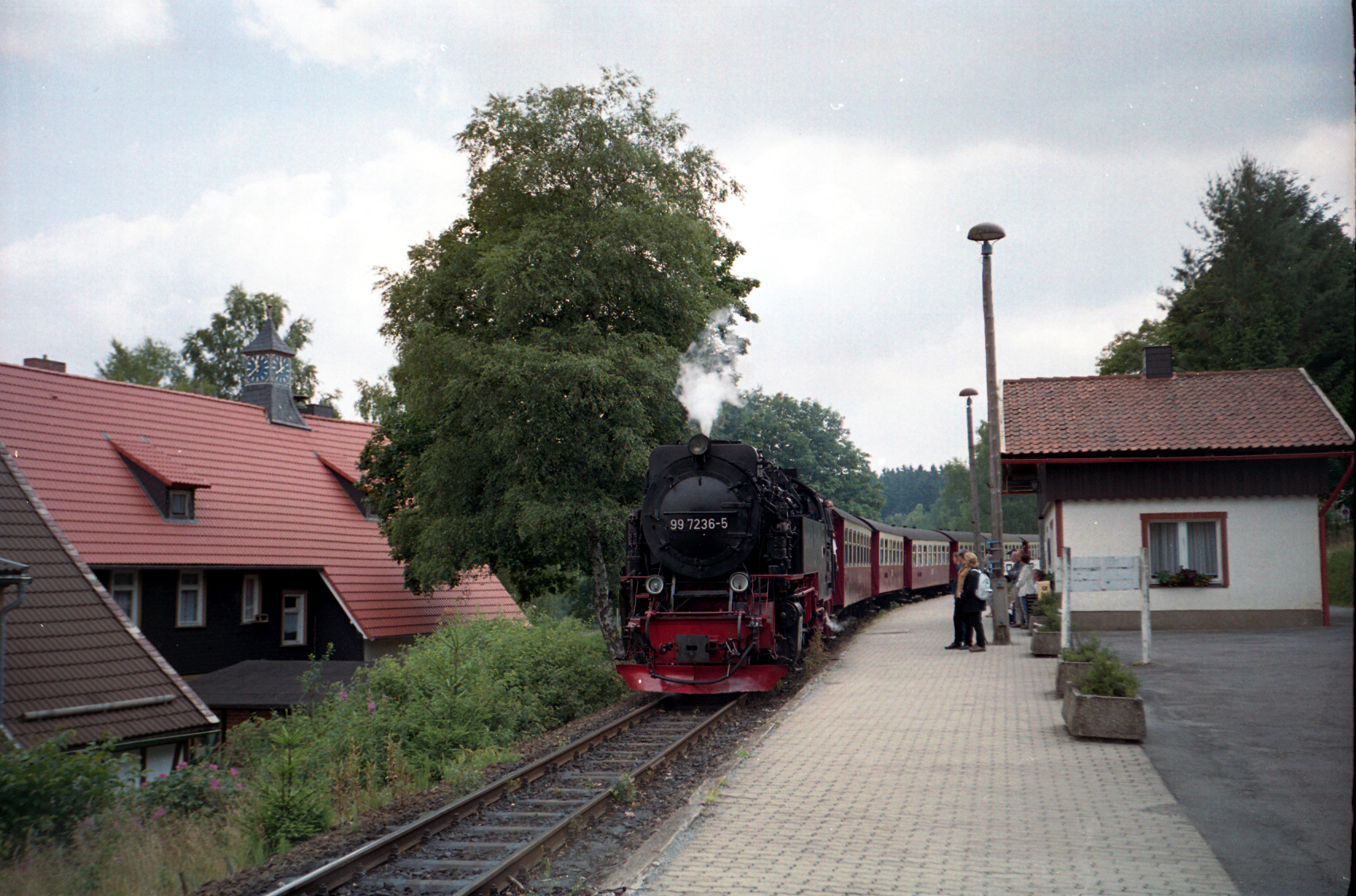
No. 99 7236 at Sorge halt

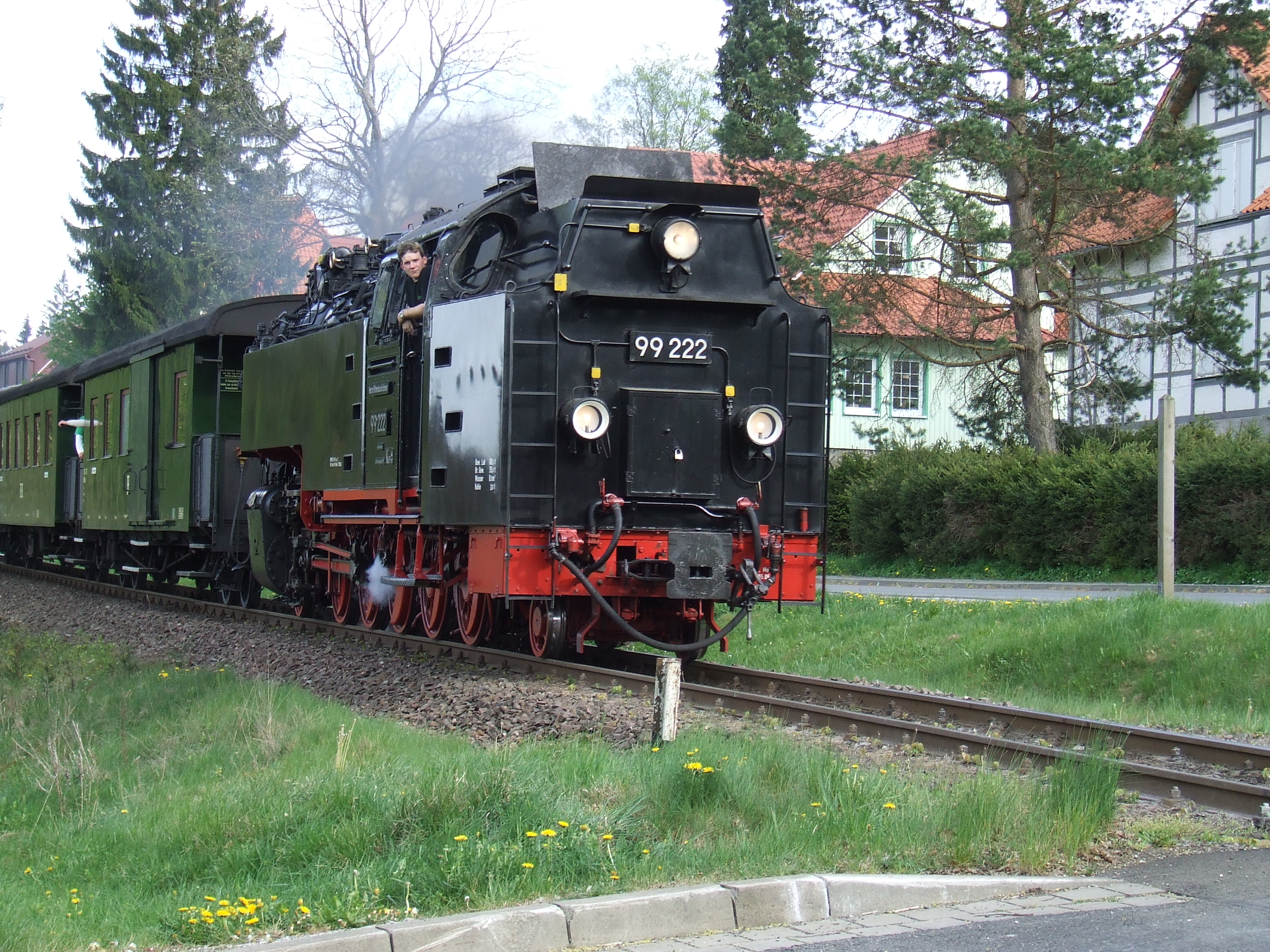
99 222 (Einheitsdampflokomotive)

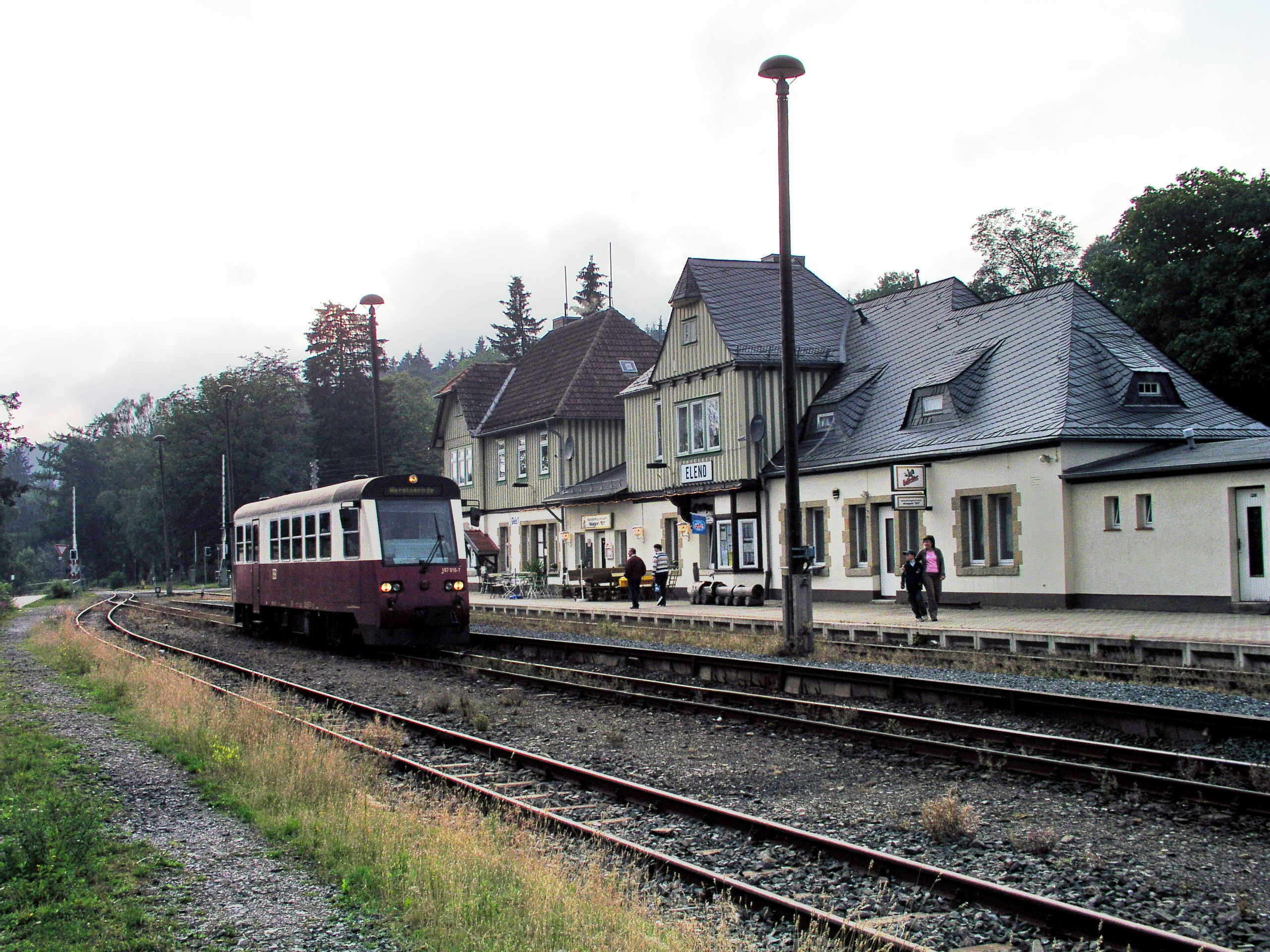
Elend station with a railbus

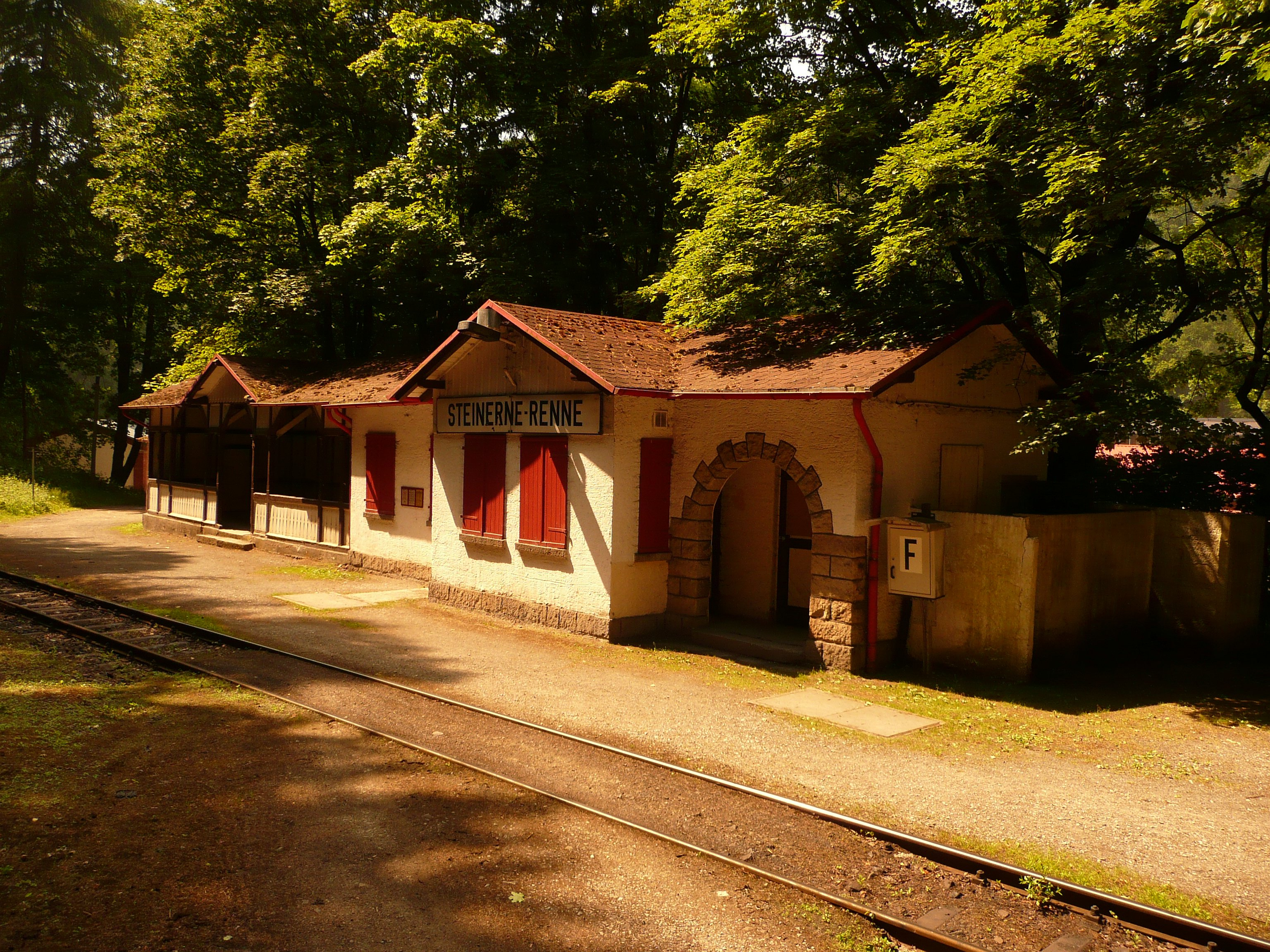
Steinerne Renne station

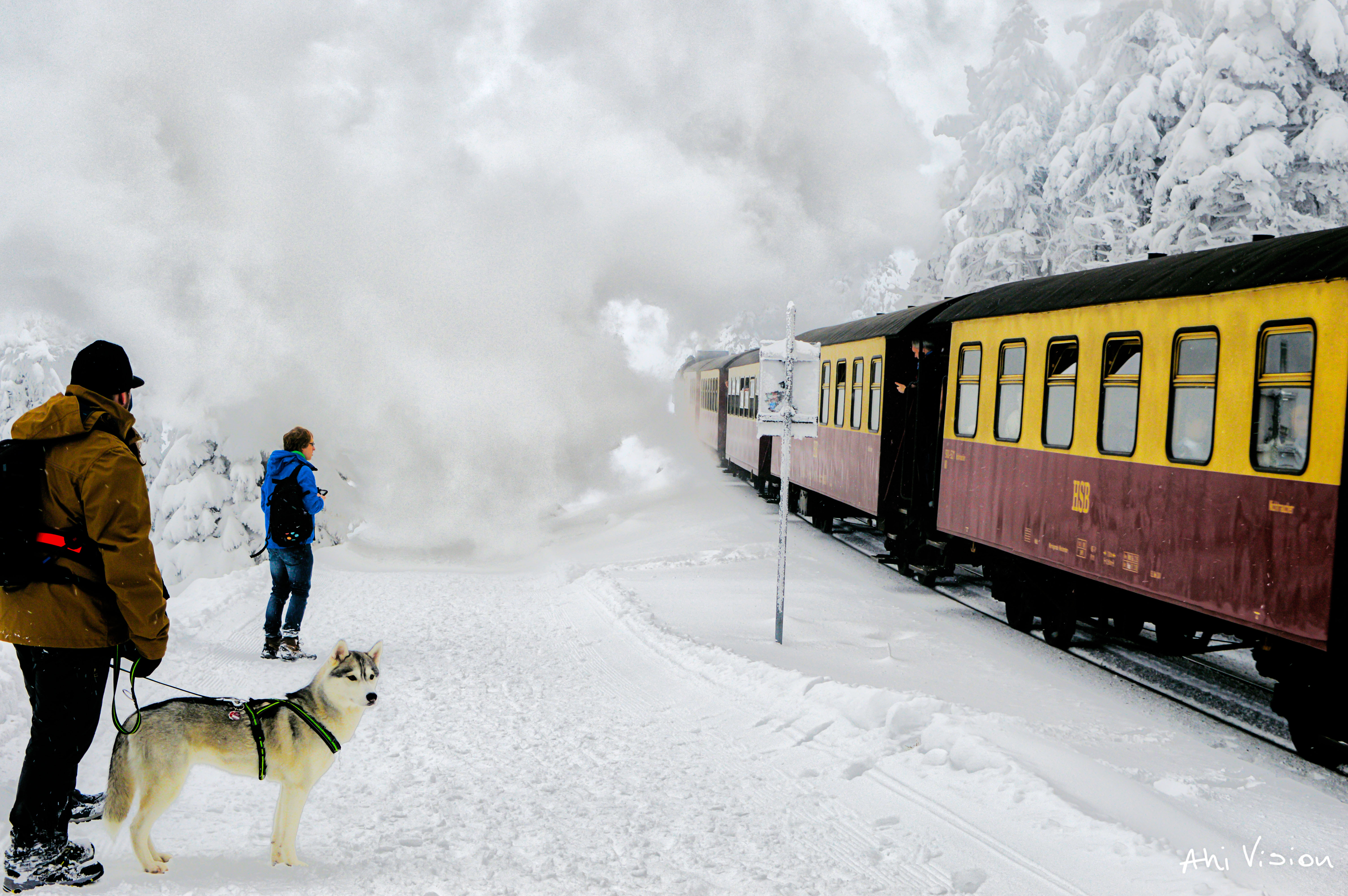

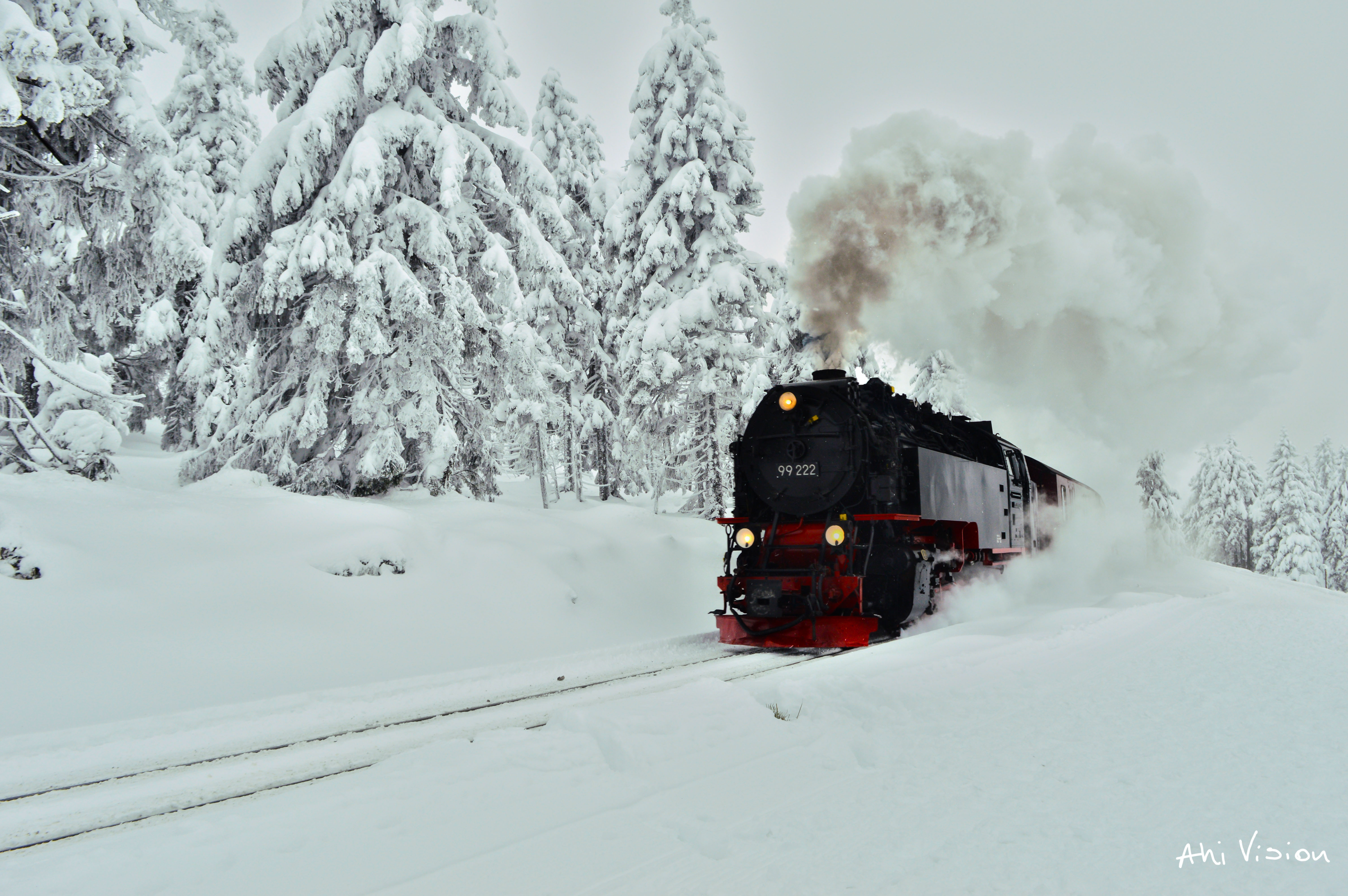

== See also ==
- Rübeland Railway
- There is information on the rolling stock used on the line at Harz Narrow Gauge Railways.

== Sources ==
- Eisenbahnatlas Deutschland – Ausgabe 2005/2006. Schweers + Wall, Aachen 2005, ISBN 3-89494-134-0
- Hans Röper; Helmut Becker; Werner Dill; Gerhard Zieglgänsberger (1992), Die Harzquer- und Brockenbahn (in German) (3. erweiterte ed.), Berlin: transpress, ISBN 3-344-70747-7

== Film ==
- SWR: Eisenbahn-Romantik – Die Harzquerbahn (Folge 327)
