= Brocken Railway =

Tourist metre gauge railway in the Harz mountain range of Germany

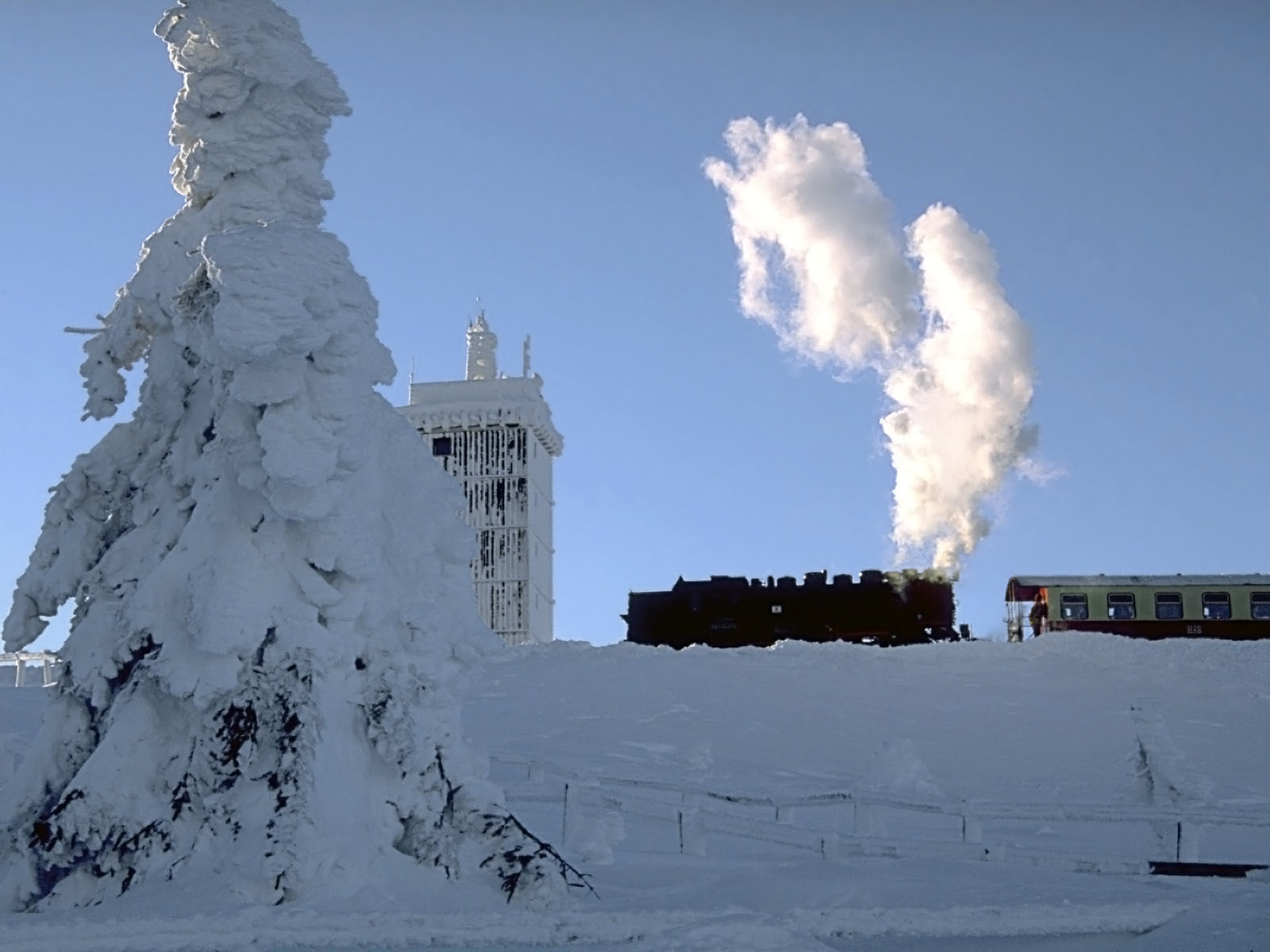
- In the vicinity of the Brocken weather station, December 2001

Overview
- Native name: Brockenbahn
- Locale: Saxony-Anhalt, Germany
- Termini: Drei Annen Hohne; Brocken

Technical
- Line length: 19.0 km (11.8 mi)
- Track gauge: 1,000 mm (3 ft 3 3/8 in) metre gauge
- Operating speed: 40 km/h (24.9 mph) (maximum)
- Maximum incline: 3.3%

The Brocken Railway (German: Brockenbahn) is one of three tourist metre gauge railways which together with the Harz Railway and Selke Valley Railway form the Harz Narrow Gauge Railways railway network in the Harz mountain range of Germany.

It runs from the station of Drei Annen Hohne (51.7704°N 10.7269°E) at 542 m (1,778 ft), where it joins the Harz Railway, via Schierke and the Bode River valley to the summit of the Brocken (51.7997°N 10.6179°E), the highest mountain of the Harz at 1,141 m (3,743 ft) and part of the Harz National Park.

== Route ==
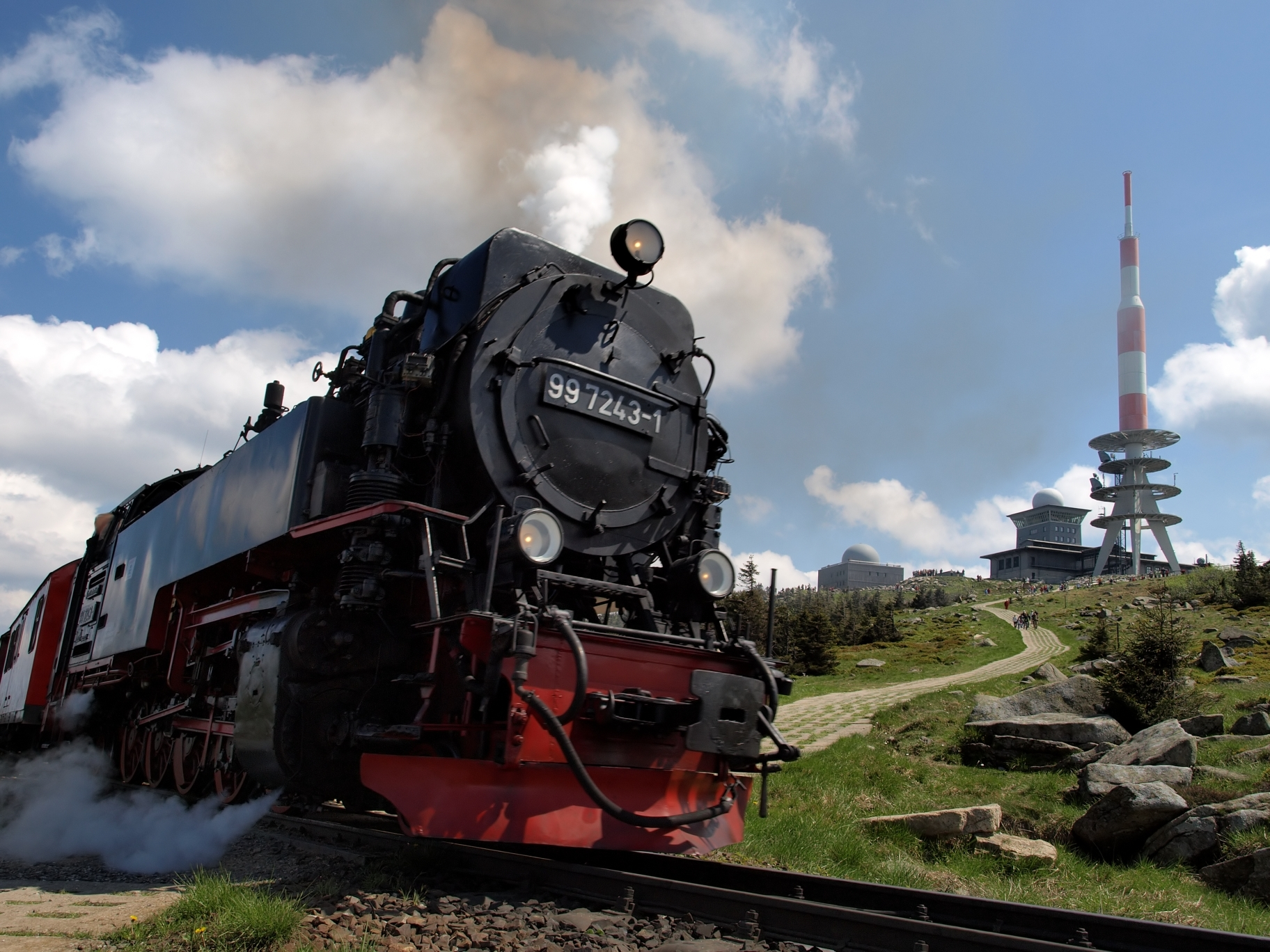
Steam locomotive 99 7243

The Brocken Railway leaves Drei Annen Hohne station (542 m above NN), like the Harz Railway, in a southwesterly direction. As it leaves the station, however, it crosses the road to Schierke/Elend and then enters the Harz National Park. It then heads west to Schierke station (688 m), where until 1963, there was a siding to Knaupsholz granite quarry at about the half-way point. The line then runs for some distance along the valley of the Cold Bode, which lies south and far below the line. Next the 971 m high mountain, the Wurmberg, appears on the left, and the train crosses the Brocken Road for the first time.

After a tight left hand bend before the Eckerloch Bridge and another right-hander, the line reaches Goetheweg station (956 m), which is now only used as a locomotive depot. Then the line runs directly to the Brocken, encircling it in a spiral 1 ½ times, during which it crosses the Brocken Road again, and then finally ends after 18.9 km at Brocken station (1,125 m).

== History ==
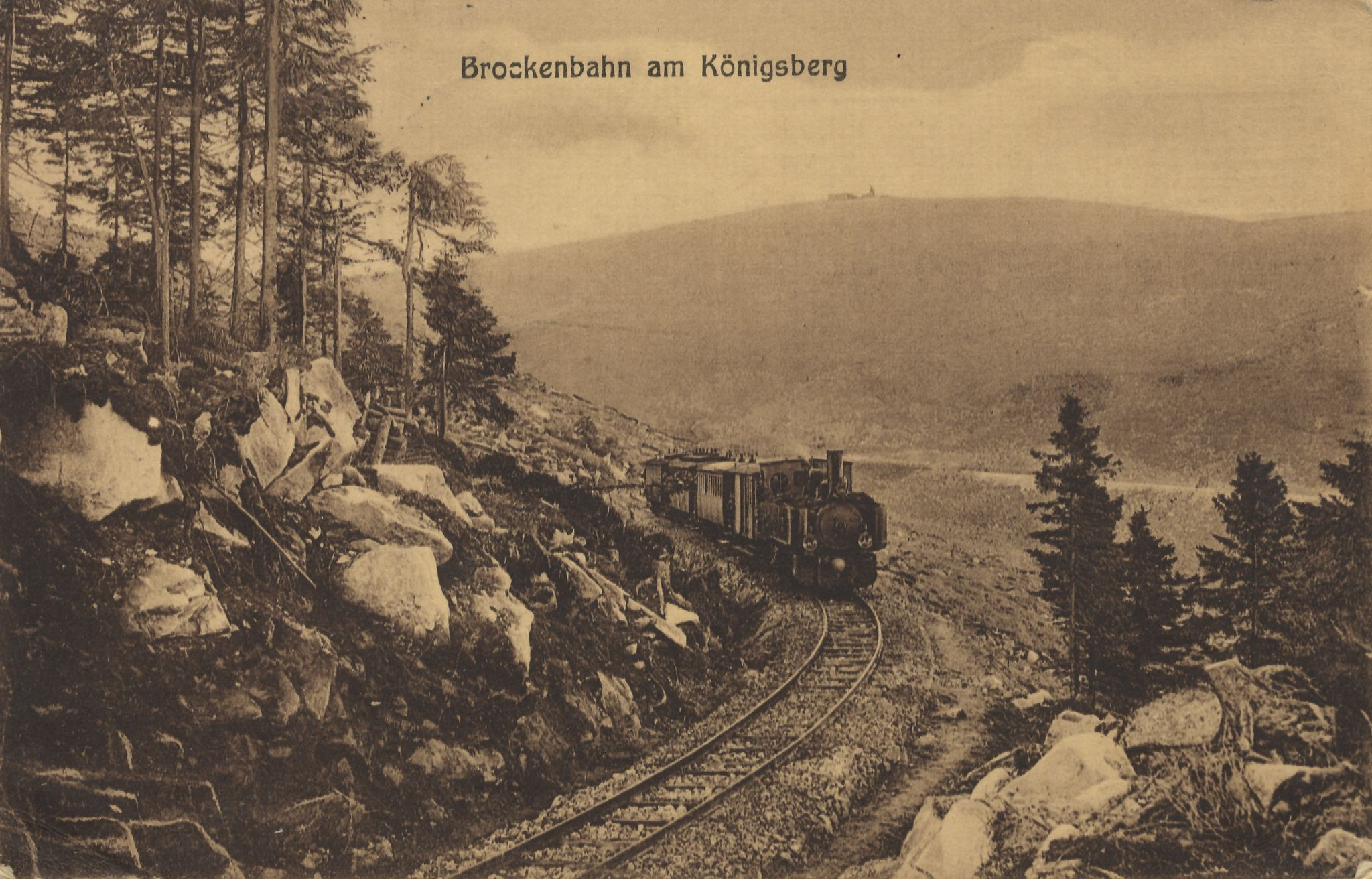
The Brocken Railway at Königsberg, around 1900

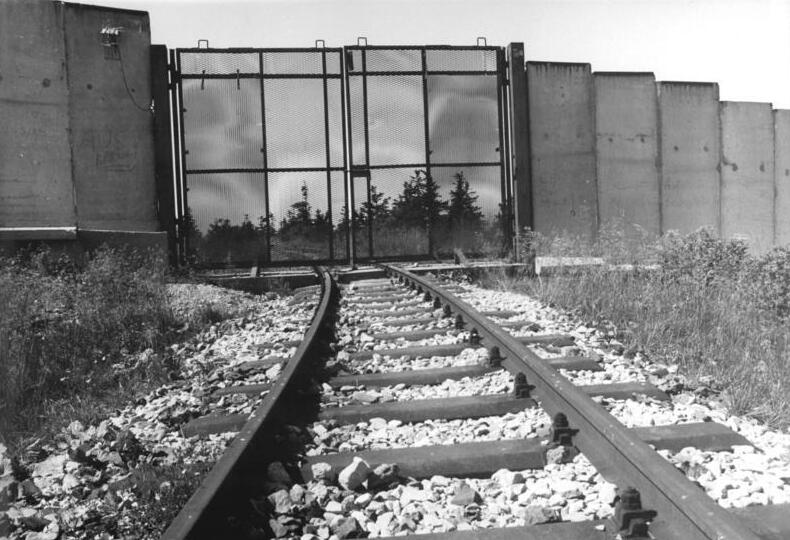
Railway passage in the wall encompassing the Brocken summit, September 1990

As early as 1869 there was a design for the construction of a railway to the Brocken, but it was turned down. A resubmission in 1895 succeeded, however, and, on 30 May 1896, the construction permit was issued once Prince Otto of Stolberg-Wernigerode had allocated the requisite land. The first section of the Brocken Railway, from Drei Annen Hohne to Schierke, was opened on 20 June 1898 and construction work for the remaining section up to the Brocken was begun on 4 October 1898. Initially services to the Brocken only ran between 30 April to 15 October; during the winter trains terminated at Schierke station. At the end of the Second World War significant damage occurred to the track, mainly through bombs and artillery shells, in the course of fighting in the Harz, which had been declared a fortress. The section to the Brocken was only reopened, therefore, in 1949.

The operator of the Brocken Railway until 5 August 1948 was the Nordhausen-Wernigerode Railway Company (NWE), after which it belonged from the Association of Publicly Owned Companies (VVB), part of Saxony-Anhalt's transport services, and, from 11 April 1949 to the Deutsche Reichsbahn in East Germany. Only after the German winter sports championships in 1950, which took place in Schierke, did winter trains run up to the Brocken summit. A railway station at Eckerloch was also built for the championships which was closed again after they had ended. The location of the former sidings at Eckerloch station can still be easily seen.

Goods trains continued to work the Brocken Railway right up to 1987, although since the construction of the Berlin Wall on 13 August 1961 the Brocken and its station had been part of the out-of-bounds area and thus not accessible to the public. Up to that time the trains transported coal, oil and building materials up the mountain for the East German Border Troops and Soviet soldiers who were stationed there.

Passengers services on the Brocken Railway continued to run from Drei Annen Hohne to Schierke; usually only two pairs of passenger train pairs ran each day; however they could be used with only a special pass, because Schierke lay in the border zone with West Germany.

After German reunification the continued operation of the Brocken Railway was initially called into question, however united efforts by railway enthusiasts and politicians under the overall control of the then state Minister for the Economy, Horst Rehberger, helped to give the Brocken Railway a second chance. The German Armed Forces (Bundeswehr) was also involved, because the Brocken Railway was needed to haul away the obsolete, military facilities on the Brocken. On 15 September 1991, after being renovated, the Brocken Railway was ceremoniously opened to the public with two steam-hauled trains. The trains were headed by locomotive no. 99 5903, a Mallet locomotive, which had been procured by the NWE in 1897/98, and locomotive no. 99 6001, a prototype developed in 1939 by the firm of Krupp.

Since the privatisation of the narrow gauge lines in the Harz in 1993 the Brocken Railway has been operated by the Harz Narrow Gauges Railways (HSB).

The steam trains on the Brocken Railway have become popular with thousands of tourists every year, offering convenient access to the top of the Brocken.

== Current operations ==
Video of the Brocken Railway in operation (2013).

Up to six pairs of trains run daily to the top of the Brocken during the winter. Of those, four start and end in Wernigerode. During the summer, services are increased to eleven pairs of trains daily. The fastest train takes 49 minutes to reach the summit. The Brocken Railway is the only HSB line whose regular services are exclusively hauled by steam locomotives such as the Class 99 (specials are also hauled by diesel railbuses and diesel engines of Class 199.8, the latter for clearing snow).

== Gallery ==
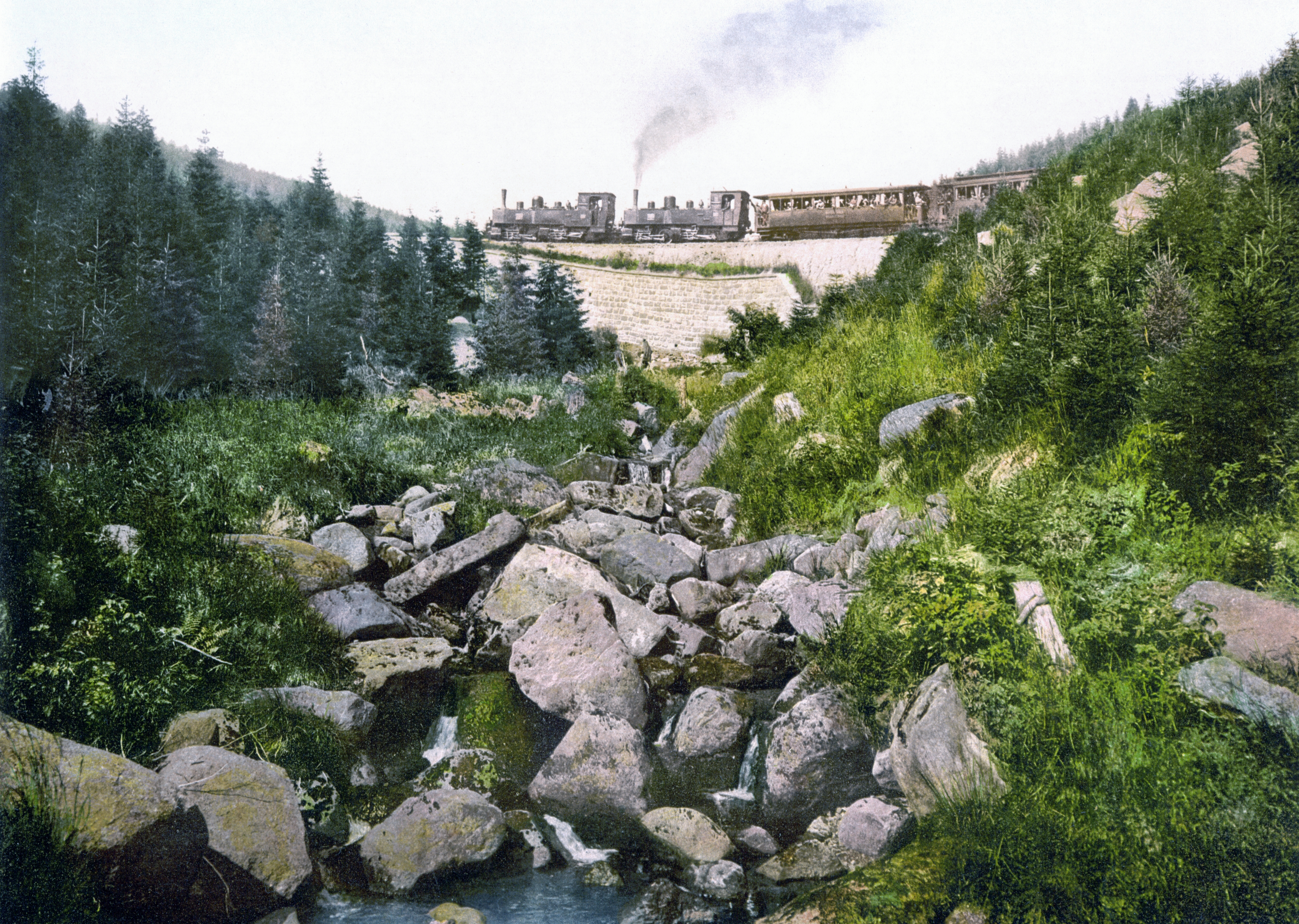
Brocken Railway around 1900

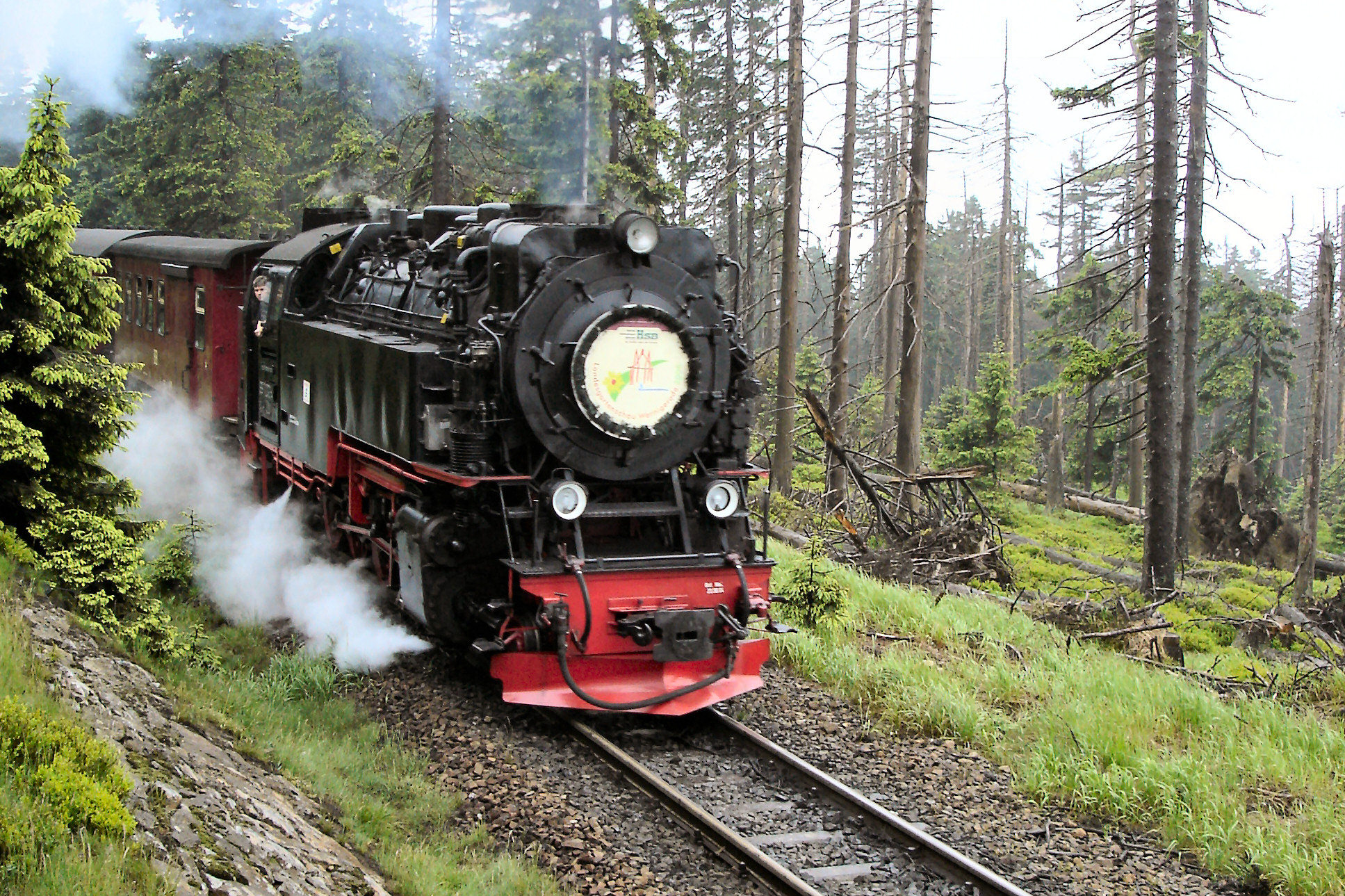
On the way to the Brocken

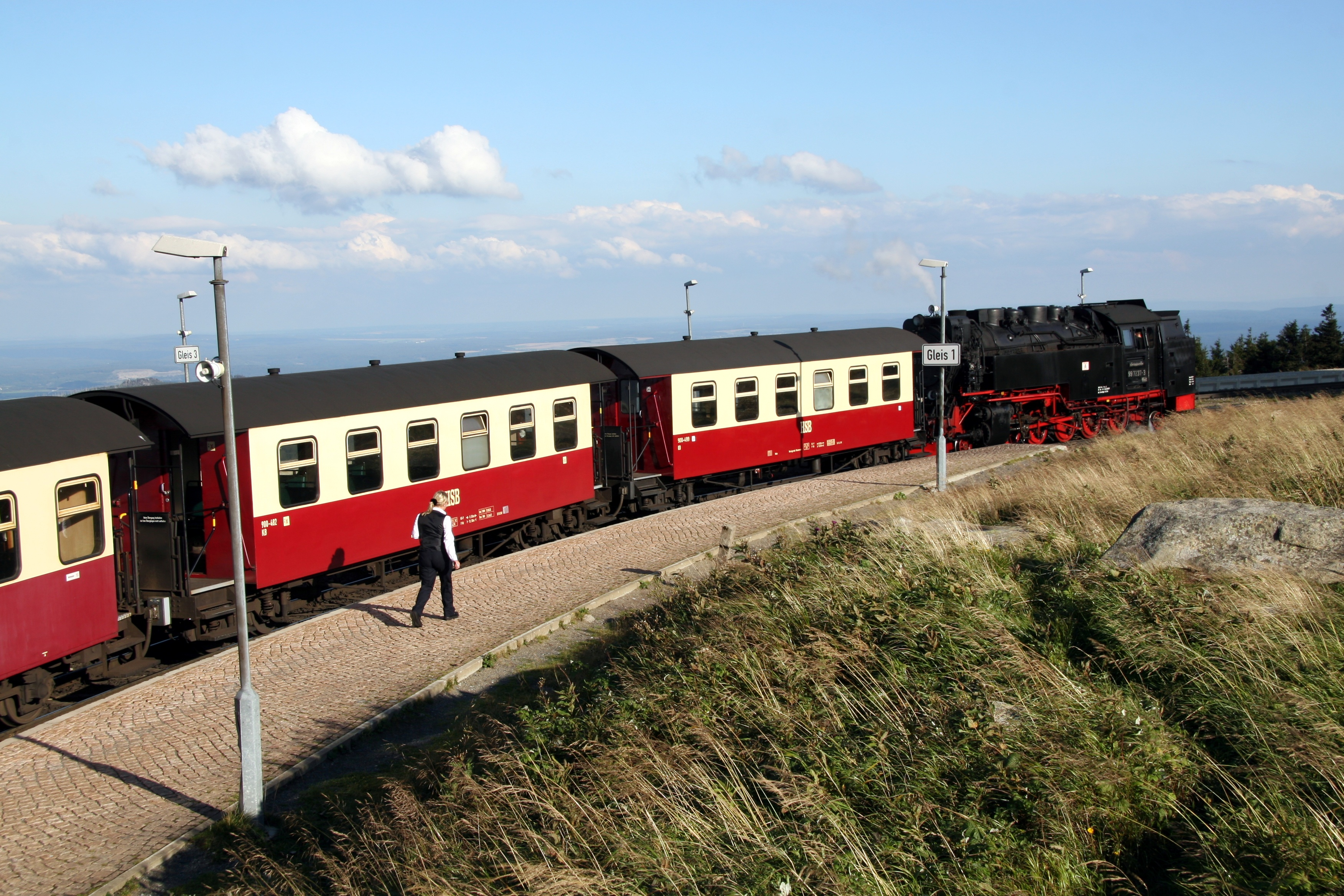
Steam train at Brocken station

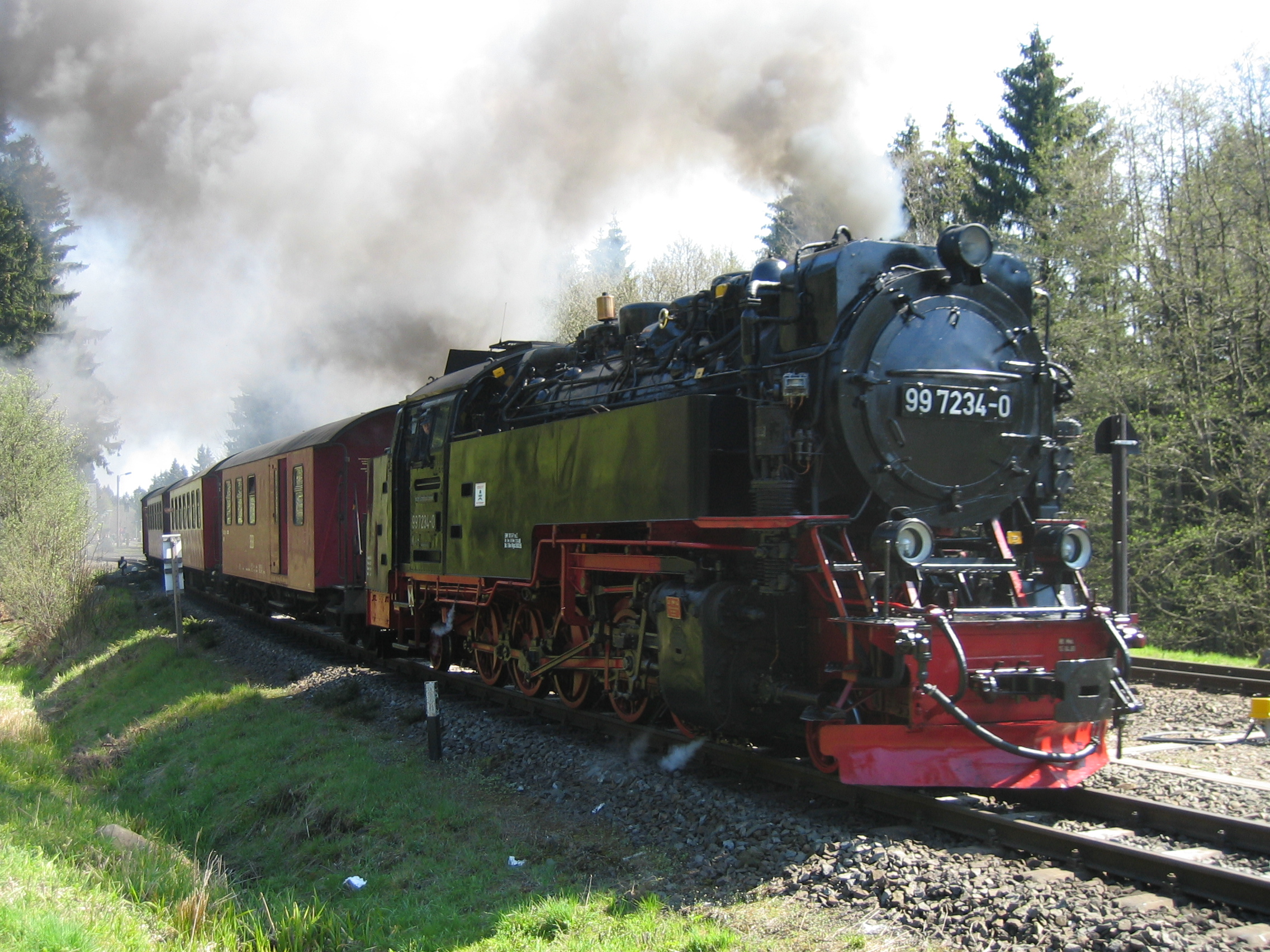
Brocken Railway at Drei Annen Hohne

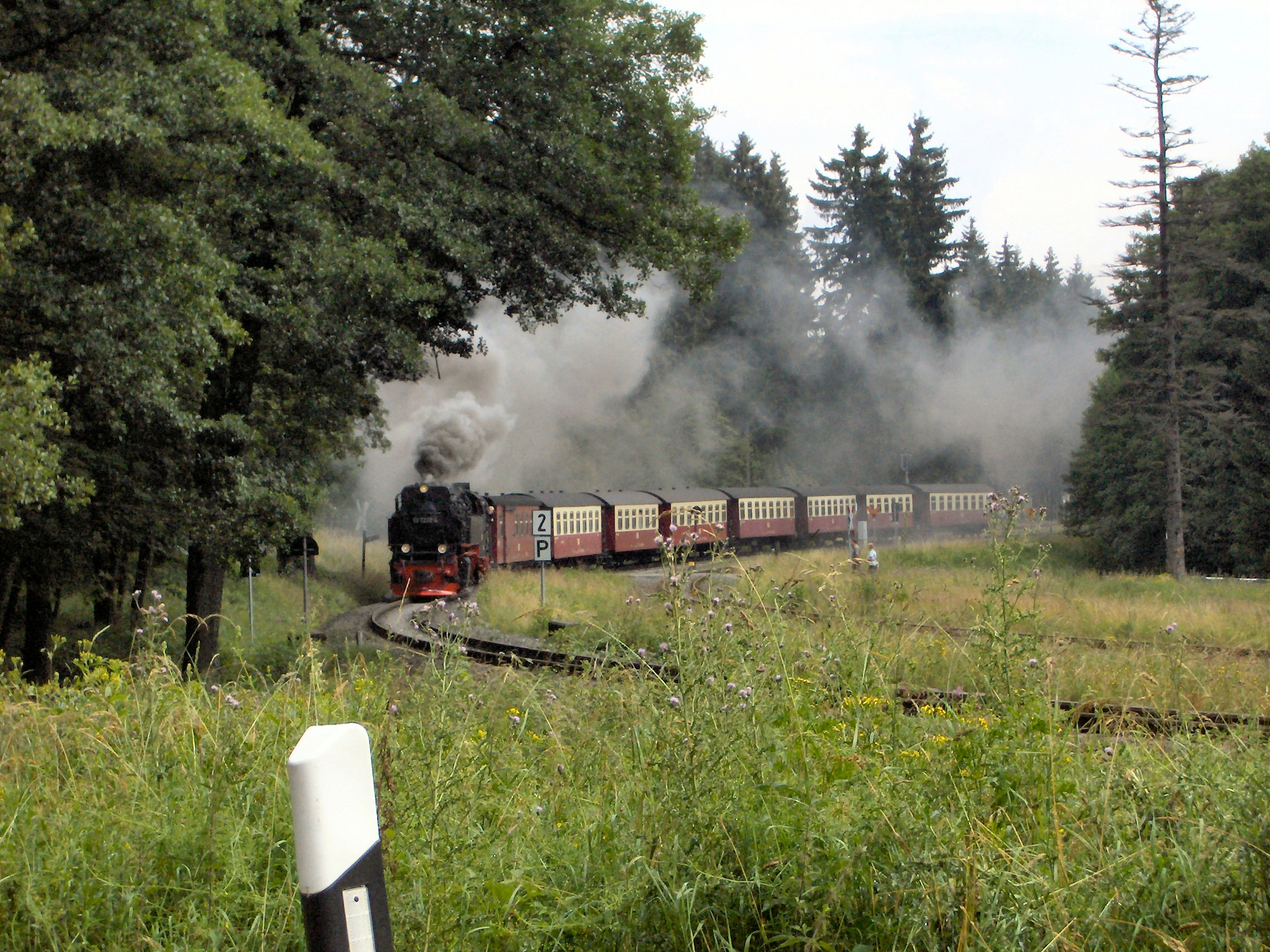
Brocken Railway Drei Annen Hohne

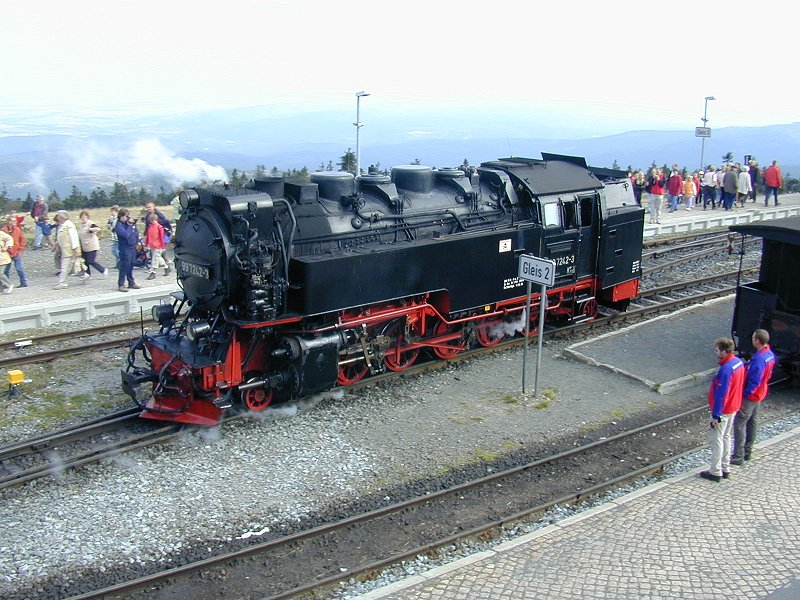
Neubaudampflokomotive at Brocken station

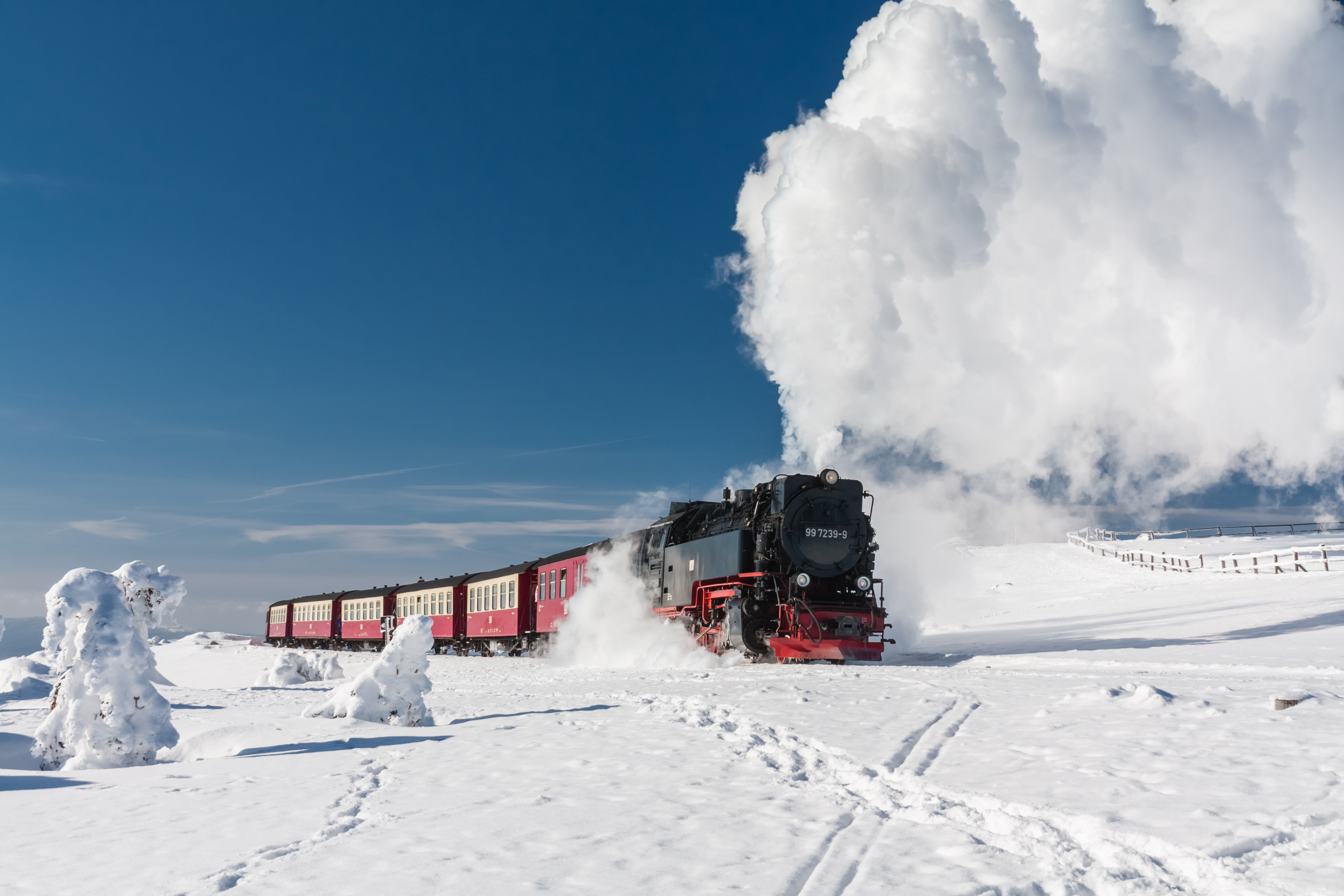

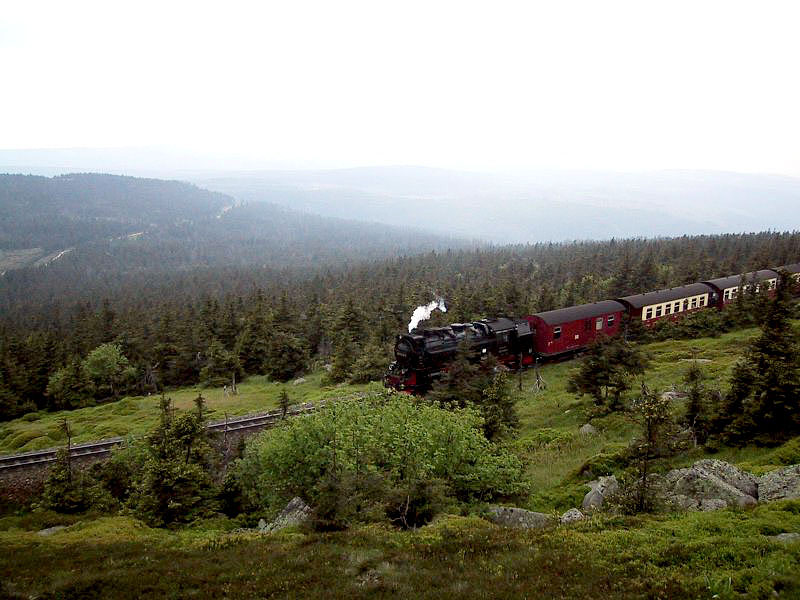
Brocken Railway below the Brocken plateau

== See also ==
- Brocken station
