= Class 84 =

Class 84 may refer to:

- British Rail Class 84, a class of electric locomotives
- DRG Class 84, a class of German 2-10-2T steam locomotives
