= Schwartzkopff-Eckhardt bogie =

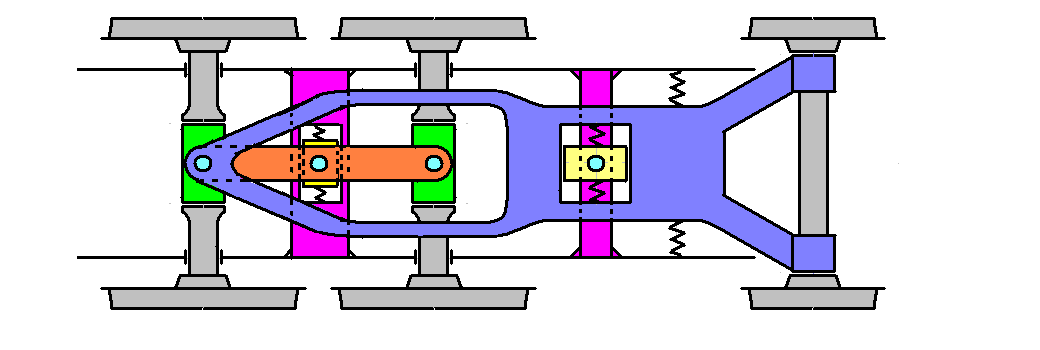
Diagram of a Schwartzkopff-Eckhardt bogie

A Schwartzkopff-Eckhardt bogie (German: Schwartzkopff-Eckhardt-Lenkgestell or Schwartzkopff-Eckhardt-Gestell) is a mechanical device to improve the curve running of steam locomotives.

The Schwartzkopff-Eckhardt bogie is a further refinement of the Krauss-Helmholtz bogie, whereby two coupled axles and the carrying axle are combined within the bogie. The carrying axle steers the second coupled axle via a long shaft and this also moves the first coupled axle via a Beugniot lever. This bogie is used on the DRG Class 84. Whether DR Class 99.23-24 locomotives were also fitted with this arrangement is not entirely clear.

It was named after the L. Schwartzkopff locomotive factory and its chief engineer, Friedrich Wilhelm Eckhardt.

== See also ==
- DRG Class 84
- DR Class 99.23-24
