= DR Class 99.23-24 =

Class of East German steam locomotives

DR Class 99.23–24
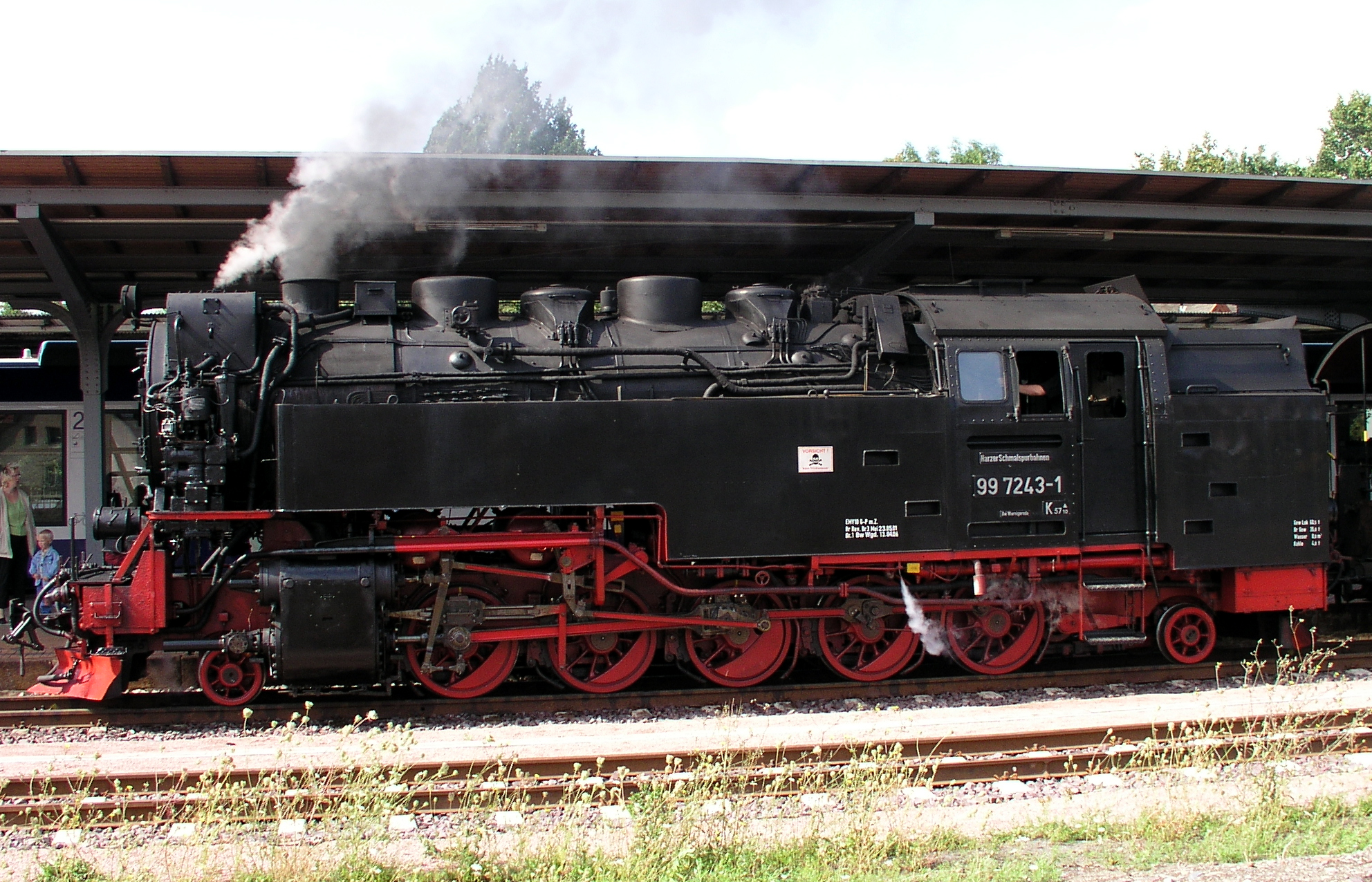
- 99 7243-1 in 2006
Type and origin
- Power type: Steam
- Builder: VEB Lokomotivbau "Karl Marx" Babelsberg
- Serial number: 134008–134028
- Build date: 1954–1956
- Total produced: 21
Specifications
- Configuration
  - Whyte: 2-10-2T
  - UIC: 1′E1′ h2t
  - German: K 57.10
- Gauge: 1,000 mm (3 ft 3 3/8 in)
- Leading dia.: 500 mm (1 ft 7 5/8 in)
- Driver dia.: 1,000 mm (3 ft 3 3/8 in)
- Trailing dia.: 550 mm (1 ft 9 5/8 in)
- Wheelbase
  - Axle spacing (Asymmetrical): 1,950 mm (76 3/4 in) +; 1,200 mm (47 1/4 in) +; 1,200 mm (47 1/4 in) +; 1,200 mm (47 1/4 in) +; 1,200 mm (47 1/4 in) +; 1,950 mm (76 3/4 in) =
  - Engine: 8,700 mm (342 1/2 in)
- Length
  - Over couplers: 11,730 mm (461 3/4 in)
  - Over headstocks: 11,100 mm (437 in)
- Width: 2,645 mm (8 ft 8 1/8 in)
- Height: 3,650 mm (11 ft 11 11/16 in)
- Axle load: 9.5 t (9.3 long tons; 10.5 short tons)
- Adhesive weight: 47.5 t (46.7 long tons; 52.4 short tons)
- Empty weight: 47.5 t (46.7 long tons; 52.4 short tons)
- Service weight: 64.5 t (63.5 long tons; 71.1 short tons)
- Fuel type: Coal
- Fuel capacity: 4.0 t (3.9 long tons; 4.4 short tons)
- Water cap.: 8.0 m^{3} (1,760 imp gal; 2,110 US gal)
- Firebox
  - Grate area: 2.8 m^{2} (30 sq ft)
- Boiler
  - Pitch: 2,500 mm (8 ft 2 3/8 in)
  - Tube plates: 3,200 mm (10 ft 6 in)
  - Small tubes: 44.5 mm (1 3/4 in), 114 off
  - Large tubes: 121 mm (4 3/4 in), 32 off
- Boiler pressure: 14 bar (14.3 kgf/cm^{2}; 203 psi)
- Feedwater heater: Mixer-preheater
- Heating surface
  - Firebox: 10.4 m^{2} (112 sq ft)
  - Tubes: 49.7 m^{2} (535 sq ft)
  - Flues: 35.4 m^{2} (381 sq ft)
  - Total surface: 95.5 m^{2} (1,028 sq ft)
- Superheater
  - Heating area: 30.0 m^{2} (323 sq ft)
- Cylinders: Two, outside
- Cylinder size: 500 mm × 500 mm (19 11/16 in × 19 11/16 in)
- Valve gear: Heusinger with Kuhn slide valves
- Loco brake: Ke G-P mZ
- Train brakes: Hardy vacuum brake, converted to Knorr compressed air brake
- Couplers: Equalising lever coupler; In Eisfeld: Janney
Performance figures
- Maximum speed: 40 km/h (25 mph)
- Indicated power: 700–750 PS (515–552 kW; 690–740 hp)
- Tractive effort: 102.9 kN (23,100 lbf)
Career
- Operators: Former: Deutsche Reichsbahn (GDR) (17) / Soviet Railways (4); Current: Harzer Schmalspurbahnen GmbH (17)
- Numbers: DR: 99 231 – 99 247; After 1970: 99 7231 – 99 7247

The DR Class 99.23 are metre gauge tank locomotives built by the Deutsche Reichsbahn (DR) in East Germany from 1954 to 1956. When they entered service they had operating numbers 99 231–99 247. Today they are numbered 99 7231–99 7247.

== History ==
A total of 17 locomotives were bought by the DR between 1954 and 1956 for the railways of the Harzquerbahn and Brockenbahn, and for the line from Eisfeld to Schönbrunn to replace much of the outdated fleet. Four locomotives were built for the USSR in 1956, but their ultimate fate is unknown. The first seven units (99 231 to 99 237) were originally equipped with two Krauss-Helmholtz bogies. Due to problems with curve running, the engines in the second series were given Beugniot levers between the first and second coupled axles in addition to the Krauss-Helmholtz bogies (according to other sources also a Schwartzkopff-Eckhardt II bogie).

The locomotives of the first series were subsequently modified with Beugniot levers, some in the early 1960s, others in 1973/74 (on the Harz lines). The thinner wheel flanges of the driving wheels were completely removed later to achieve better curve running, resulting in the second series not having a rigid wheelbase. The drive was applied to the third coupled axle, the locomotives had Heusinger valve gear with unsprung Müller balanced slide valves and, later, Trofimoff valves.

These Neubaulokomotiven were a fully welded development of the standard locomotives (Einheitsloks) of the DRG Class 99.22. In contrast to those, the 99.23-24s had mixer-preheaters and plate frames. However, the latter caused maintenance difficulties from the outset due to cracks and distortion. 10 locomotives (99 7232, 7240, 7245, 7239, 7236, 7234, 7237, 7241, 7243, 7247) were equipped from 2004 onward with a redesigned plate frame and 5 of those (99 7232, 7240, 7245, 7239, 7236) with new, welded steam cylinders. The 17 DR engines are all extant and based in the Harz; some however are no longer working.

The 17 German engines were converted to primary oil-firing between 1977 and 1983, and together with the DRG Class 99.22 are the most powerful German narrow gauge steam locomotives ever constructed. They were later converted back to coal-firing and are primarily used on the line up to the Brocken from Wernigerode.

Their operating numbers changed from 99 231 et seq to 99 7231 et seq on the introduction of computerised numbers in 1970 and then again to 99 0231 et seq on conversion to oil-firing. The computer numbers are still valid because the HSB retains those allocated in the 1970 DR renumbering scheme.

The engines can carry 4 tonnes (3.9 long tons; 4.4 short tons) of coal and 8,000 litres (1,760 imperial gallons; 2,113 US gallons) of water.

== Locomotives ==
- 99 7231: out of service since 2001
- 99 7232: working, new frame
- 99 7233: out of service since 1999
- 99 7234: out of service since 2025, new frame
- 99 7235: out of service since 2020
- 99 7236: working, new frame
- 99 7237: working, new frame
- 99 7238: working
- 99 7239: working, new frame
- 99 7240: working, new frame
- 99 7241: out of service since 2025, new frame
- 99 7242: out of service since 2010
- 99 7243: working, new frame
- 99 7244: working, undergoing conversion to oil-firing
- 99 7245: working, new frame
- LKM 134023: built for & lost in the USSR
- LKM 134024: built for & lost in the USSR
- LKM 134025: built for & lost in the USSR
- LKM 134026: built for & lost in the USSR
- 99 7246: out of service since 1996
- 99 7247: working, new frame

== Photo gallery ==
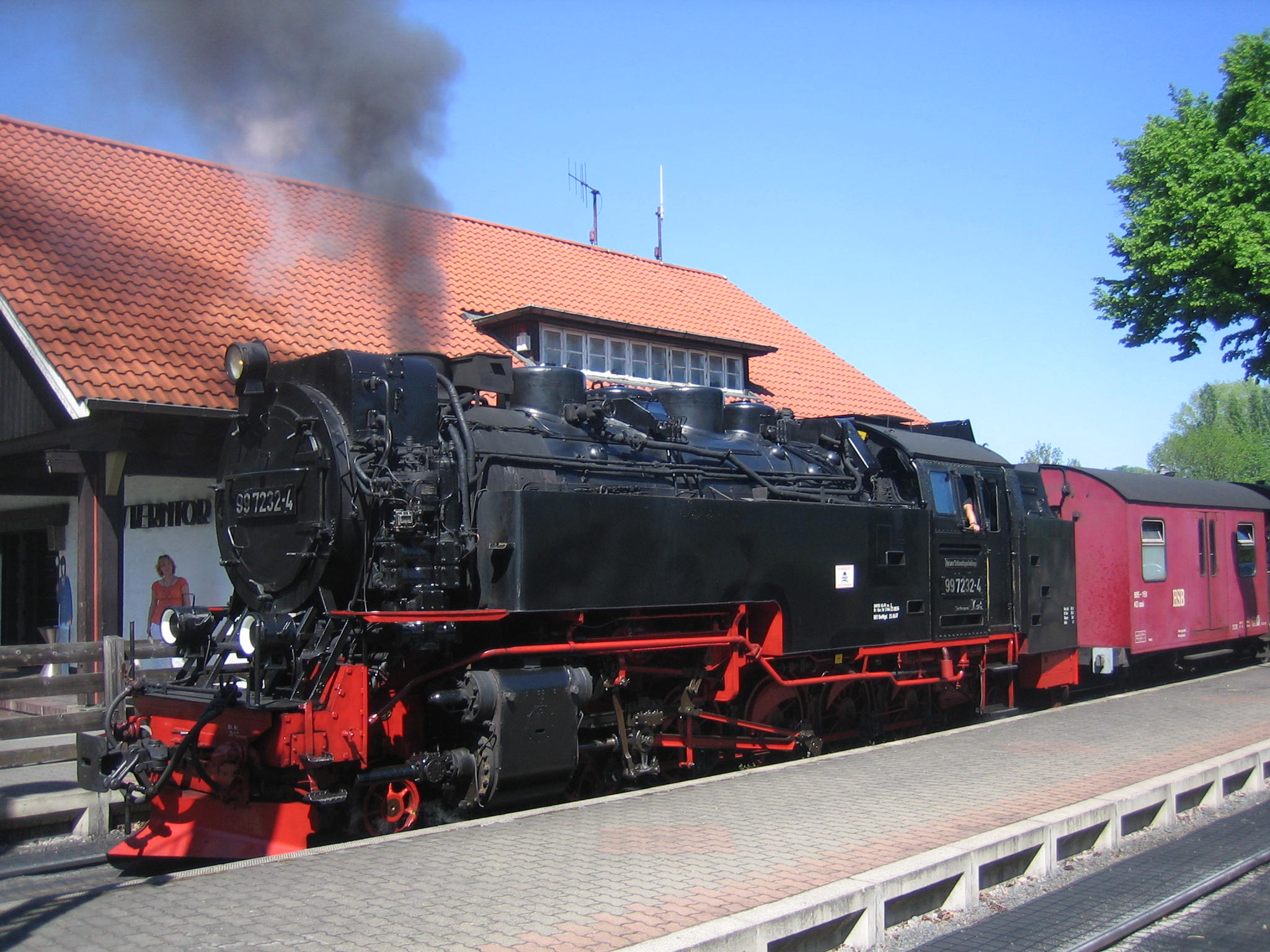
99 7232

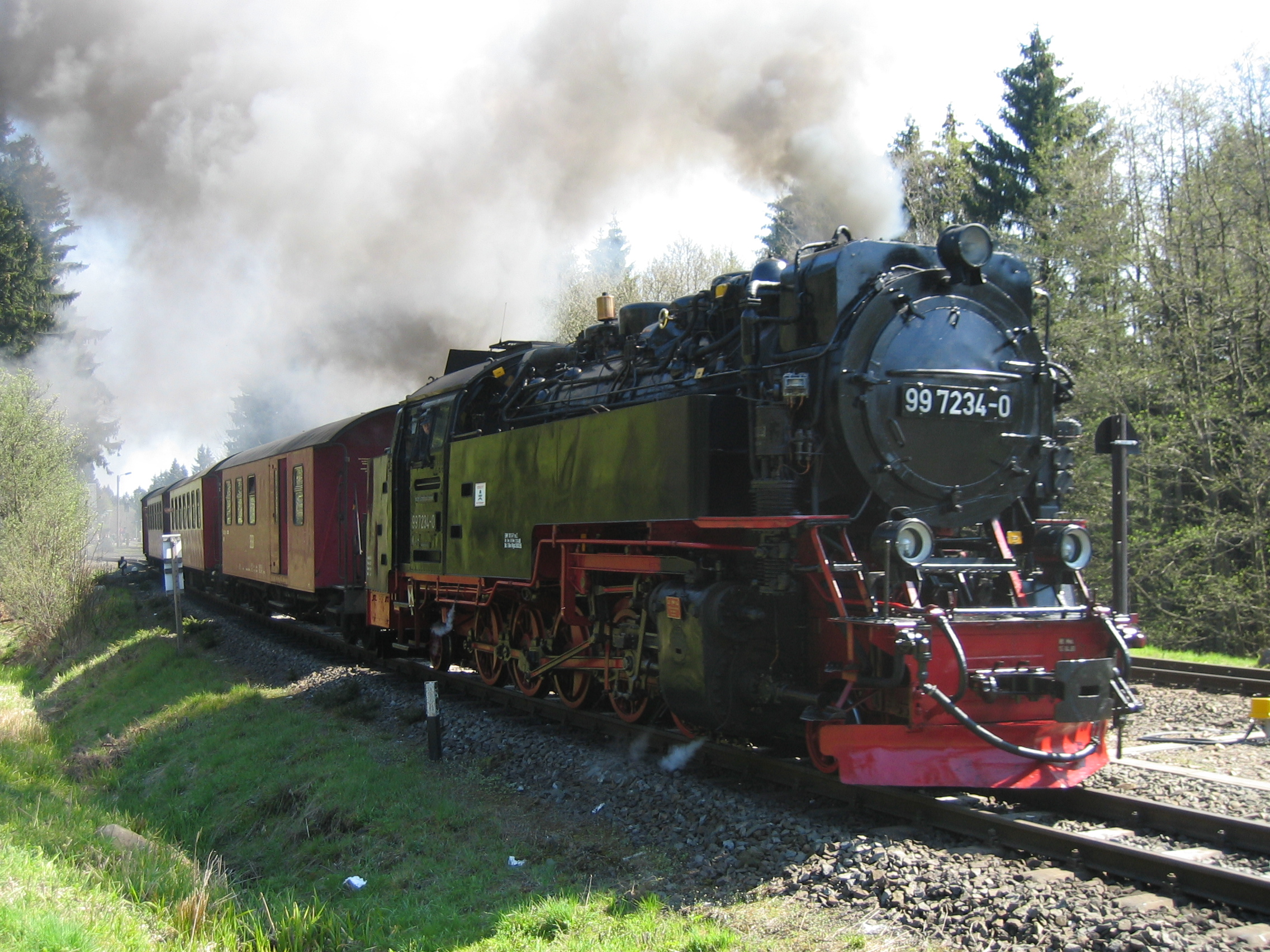
99 7234

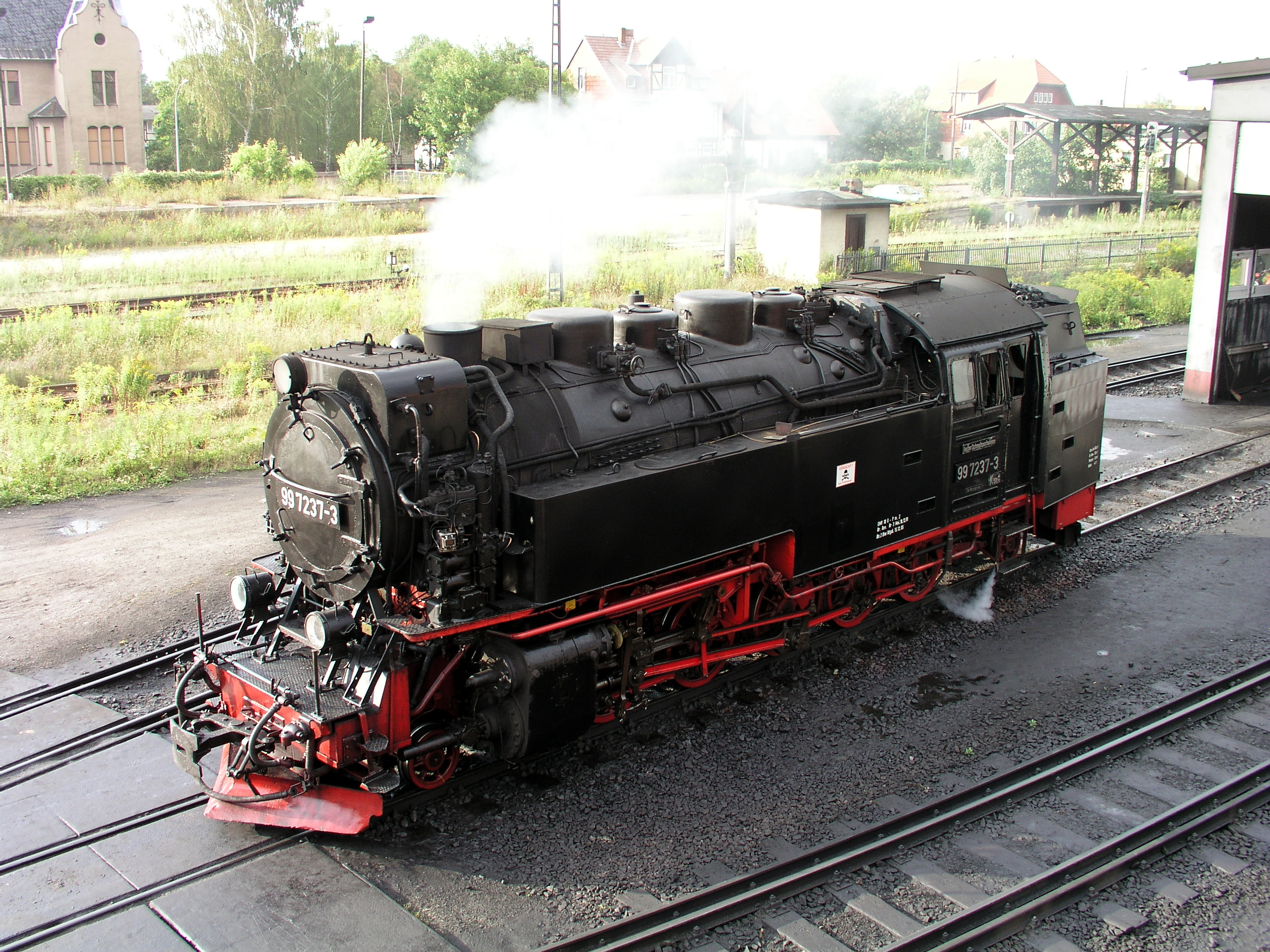
99 7237

== See also ==
- List of East German Deutsche Reichsbahn locomotives and railbuses
- Neubaulok
