= Southern Railway Ss class =

Class of 80 American 2-10-2 locomotives

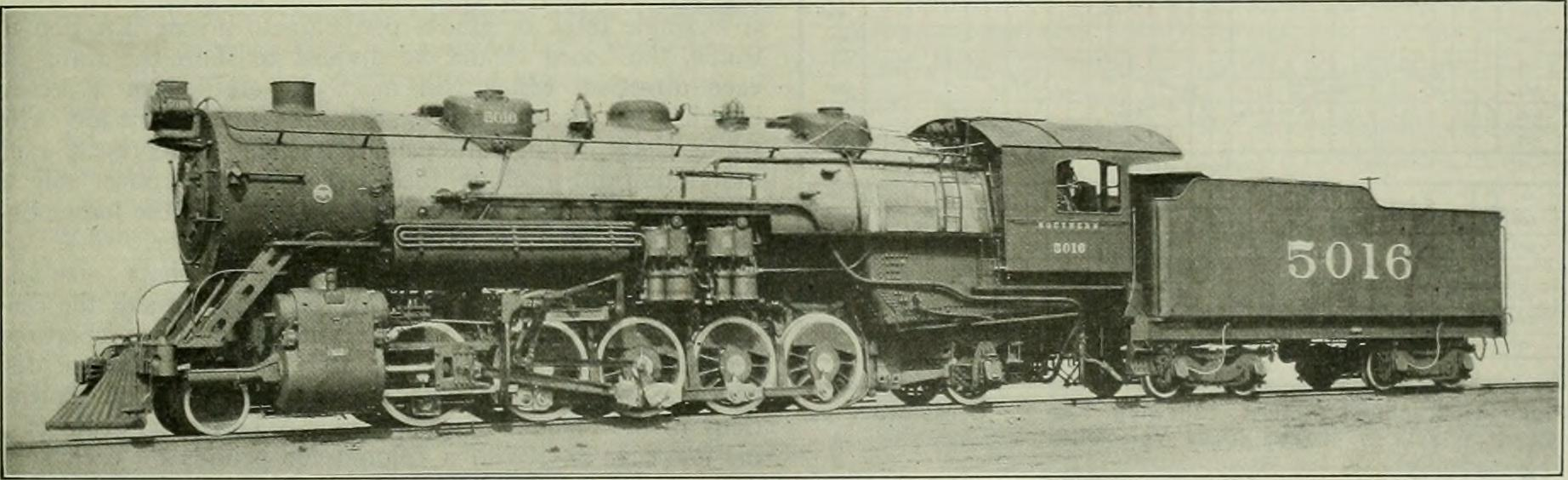
- Southern Railway No. 5016, constructed new in 1917
Type and origin
- Power type: Steam
- Builder: Baldwin Locomotive Works; ALCO's Richmond Works
- Build date: 1917-1918
- Total produced: 80
Specifications
- Configuration
  - Whyte: 2-10-2
- Gauge: 4 ft 8 1/2 in (1,435 mm) standard gauge
- Leading dia.: 33 in (838 mm)
- Driver dia.: 57 in (1,448 mm)
- Trailing dia.: 42 in (1,067 mm)
- Wheelbase: 20 ft 7 in (6.274 m)
- Length: 84 ft 3.5 in (25.69 m)
- Loco weight: 378,000 lb (171,000 kg)
- Tender weight: 176,000 lb (80,000 kg)
- Tender type: 2 axle bogie
- Fuel type: Coal
- Fuel capacity: 16 t (16 long tons; 18 short tons), formerly 12 t (12 long tons; 13 short tons)
- Water cap.: 9,000 US gal (34,000 L; 7,500 imp gal)
- Firebox
  - Grate area: 88 sq ft (8.2 m^{2})
- Boiler pressure: 200 psi (1.38 MPa), formerly 190 psi (1.31 MPa)
- Feedwater heater: Worthington (added in the 1940s)
- Cylinders: Two, outside
- Cylinder size: 28 in × 32 in (711 mm × 813 mm)
- Valve gear: Southern
- Valve type: 14-inch (356 mm) piston valves
Performance figures
- Tractive effort: 74,000 lbf (329.2 kN), formerly 71,000 lbf (315.8 kN)
Career
- Operators: Southern Railway; Cincinnati, New Orleans and Texas Pacific Railway (1918 only)
- Class: Ss
- Numbers: SOU No. 5000-5054; CNO&TP No. 6350-6374→SOU No. 5055-5079
- Withdrawn: 1938-1939, 1949-1952
- Disposition: All scrapped

The Southern Railway Ss was a class of 2-10-2 "Santa Fe" type steam locomotives built in 1917 and 1918 for the Southern Railway (SOU). They were assigned to haul and bank heavy freight trains over the Saluda Grade and Old Fort Loops in the Blue Ridge Mountains of North Carolina.

== History ==
Ever since the Santa Fe Railway develop the 2-10-2 wheel arrangement (hence the Railroad's namesake) in 1904, the Southern Railway (SOU) began placing a new order of their own 2-10-2s; the Ss class were built with the first batches of fifty-five locomotives (Nos. 5000-5054) in 1917 by the Baldwin Locomotive Works in Philadelphia, Pennsylvania. These locomotives were equipped with 57 in (1,448 mm) driving wheels, duplex stokers, four sand domes, Southern valve gear, and 28 in × 32 in (711 mm × 813 mm) cylinders with an operating boiler pressure of 190 psi (1.31 MPa), which made them produced 71,000 lb (32.2 tonnes) of tractive effort. They were also equipped with a two-axle bogie tender with a fuel capacity of 12 tonnes (26,000 lb) of coal and 9,000 US gallons (34,000 L) of water.

In 1918, the second batches of twenty-five 2-10-2s (Nos. 6350-6374) were built by the American Locomotive Company (ALCO) of Richmond, Virginia for SOU's Cincinnati, New Orleans and Texas Pacific (CNO&TP) division. The CNO&TP locomotives were equipped with a wimble smoke duct due to the CNO&TP route traveling through 27 tunnels between Danville, Kentucky and Harriman, Tennessee, earning the nickname The Rathole Division.

The Ss class were designed to haul heavy freight trains, but were proven too slow to work on the Southern Railway's Washington, D.C. to Atlanta mainline and too big for the CNO&TP tunnels' tight clearances. Thus, No. 6350-6374 were renumbered to 5055-5079. They were very efficient on handling the mountain grades in North and South Carolina, Georgia, and Tennessee. Eventually, they were moved to Southern's Asheville and Knoxville divisions to bank and haul heavy freight trains, especially on Saluda Grade between Asheville, North Carolina and Spartanburg, South Carolina and the Old Fort Loops between Asheville and Salisbury, North Carolina in the Blue Ridge Mountains.

To work on the Asheville Division, the Ss locomotives were modified with two water gauges made longer for the engineer and fireman to safely measure the water level in the boiler while going up and down the railway grades. Additionally, the Ss locomotives were equipped with a second air pump due to the excessive use of air brakes. While they were used to bank the head end passenger trains, the Ss locomotives were given cab signals and steam brake connection; and the water pipes were added to cool down the driving wheels' tires while descending the mountains.

By the late 1940s, the Southern Railway began to dieselize with the Ss steam locomotives' duties taken over by the EMD F7 diesel locomotives. All of the Ss steam locomotives were retired and scrapped by the early 1950s, with none surviving into preservation.

== See also ==
- USRA Light Santa Fe

== Bibliography ==
- Prince, Richard E. (1970). Steam Locomotives and Boats: Southern Railway System (2nd ed.). Wheelwright Lithographing Company. ISBN 0-9600088-4-5.
- Ranks, Harold; Lowe, Shelby (1966). Southern Steam Power (1st ed.). Barnhart Press.
- Tillotson Jr., Curt (2000). Classic Steam Trains of the South (1st ed.). TLC Publishing. ISBN 1-883089-55-7.
- Tillotson Jr., Curt (2005). Southern Railway Steam Trains Volume 2 - Freight (1st ed.). TLC Publishing. ISBN 0-9766201-5-4.
