= PKP class OKz32 =

PKP OKz32
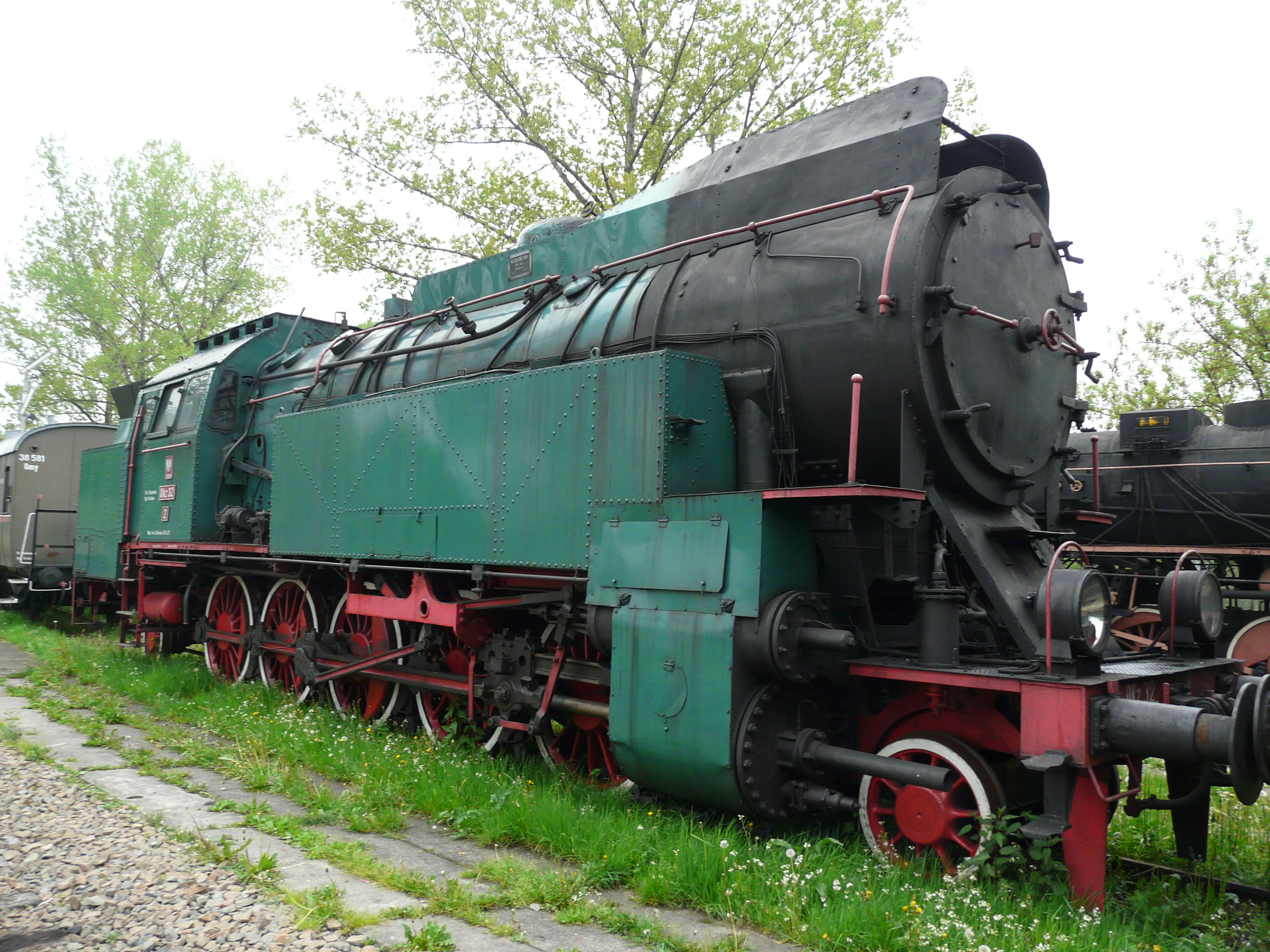
- OKz32 locomotive
Type and origin
- Power type: Steam
- Builder: H. Cegielski – Poznań
- Build date: 1934–1935
- Total produced: 25
Specifications
- Configuration
  - Whyte: 2-10-2T
  - UIC: 1′E1′ h2t
- Gauge: 1,435 mm (4 ft 8 1/2 in) standard gauge
- Leading dia.: 860 mm (33.86 in)
- Driver dia.: 1,450 mm (57.09 in)
- Trailing dia.: 860 mm (33.86 in)
- Minimum curve: 150 m (492 ft 2 in)
- Wheelbase
  - Engine: 11.700 m (38 ft 5 in)
  - Drivers: 6.400 m (21 ft 0 in)
- Length: 15.320 m (50 ft 3 in)
- Height: 4.620 m (15 ft 2 in)
- Axle load: 17 tonnes
- Loco weight: 118.4 tonnes
- Fuel type: coal
- Fuel capacity: 6 tonnes
- Water cap.: 10 m^{3} (350 cu ft)
- Firebox
  - Grate area: 3.8 m^{2} (41 sq ft)
- Boiler pressure: 15 kg/cm^{2} (1.47 MPa; 213 psi)
- Heating surface: 184.1 m^{2} (1,982 sq ft)
- Superheater
  - Heating area: 66 m^{2} (710 sq ft)
- Cylinders: Two, outside
- Cylinder size: 630 mm × 700 mm (24.80 in × 27.56 in)
- Valve gear: Heusinger
Performance figures
- Maximum speed: 75 km/h (47 mph)
- Power output: 1,868 hp (1,393 kW)
- Tractive effort: 17,200 kgf (37,920 lbf)
Career
- Operators: PKP
- Class: OKz32
- Numbers: OKz32-1 to OKz32-25
- Locale: Poland
- Preserved: 1

PKP Class OKz32 is a Polish tank locomotive of Polskie Koleje Państwowe, designed for hauling passenger trains in mountain regions, built in 1934-1935. The designation stood for passenger (O) tank (K) 2-10-2 (z) steam locomotive accepted in 1932.

== History ==
The locomotive was designed in Poland specially for passenger traffic on mountain route Kraków – Zakopane in Tatra Mountains. It was constructed in H. Cegielski works in Poznań, under direction of Prof. Antoni Xsiężopolski. The first locomotive was made in 1934 and appeared successful. A series of 25 in total was built in 1934-1935 for Polskie Koleje Państwowe. The locomotive could haul heavier trains (350 tonnes), than German-origin TKt1 and TKt2 (250 tonnes), and was faster. They were also used with freight trains.

During World War II 18 locomotives were captured by the Germans and impressed into service as DRG class 95^{3}, with numbers 301 to 318 (two of them were first captured by the Soviets, then by the Germans in 1941). The remaining 7 locomotives were seized by the Soviets in Poland and converted to broad gauge by 1941. They served in Ural Mountains during the war. Along with further locomotives captured from the Germans, Soviet Union operated 11 locomotives after the war, until 1966.

After World War II, Poland reclaimed 11 locomotives, receiving new numbers OKz32-1 to 11. They served still until the 1970s. One – OKz32-2 (former OKz32-5) was preserved, in Chabówka Railway Museum. It was operable as of 2016.
