= 2-10-2 =

Locomotive wheel arrangement

2-10-2 (Santa Fe)

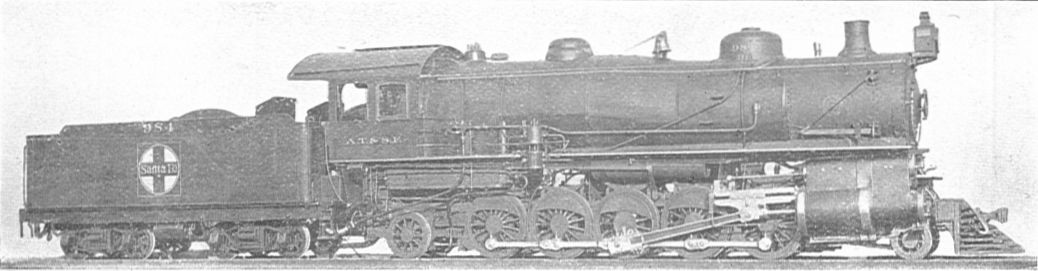
- ATSF tandem compound 2-10-2
Equivalent classifications
- UIC class: 1E1, 1′E1′
- French class: 151
- Turkish class: 57
- Swiss class: 5/7
- Russian class: 1-5-1
First known tank engine version
- First use: 1922
- Country: Germany
- Locomotive: Prussian T 20
- Railway: Deutsche Reichsbahn
- Designer: Prussian state railways
- Builder: Borsig & Hanomag
First known tender engine version
- First use: 1903
- Country: United States
- Locomotive: AT&SF 900 class
- Railway: Atchison, Topeka and Santa Fe
- Builder: Atchison, Topeka and Santa Fe
- Evolved from: 2-10-0, 2-8-2
- Evolved to: 2-10-4
- Benefits: Deeper firebox and better steaming than the 2-10-0
- Drawbacks: Nosing action at speed
First known "True type" version
- First use: 1919
- Country: United States
- Locomotive: AT&SF 3800 class
- Railway: Atchison, Topeka and Santa Fe
- Builder: Atchison, Topeka and Santa Fe
- Evolved to: 2-10-4
- Benefits: Larger and deeper firebox
- Drawbacks: Nosing action at speed

Under the Whyte notation for the classification of steam locomotives, 2-10-2 represents the wheel arrangement of two leading wheels, ten powered and coupled driving wheels, and two trailing wheels. In the United States and elsewhere the 2-10-2 is known as the Santa Fe type, after the Atchison, Topeka and Santa Fe Railway that first used the type in 1903.

== Overview ==
The 2-10-2 wheel arrangement evolved in the United States from the 2-10-0 Decapod of the Atchison, Topeka and Santa Fe Railway (ATSF). Their existing 2-10-0 tandem compound locomotives, used as pushers up Raton Pass, encountered problems reversing back down the grade for their next assignments since they were unable to track around curves at speed in reverse and had to run very slowly to avoid derailing. Consequently, the ATSF added a trailing truck to the locomotives which allowed them to operate successfully in both directions. These first 2-10-2 locomotives became the forerunners to the entire 2-10-2 family.

The trailing truck allows a larger, deeper firebox than that of a 2-10-0. Like all ten-coupled designs, the long rigid wheelbase of the coupled wheels presented a problem on curves, requiring flangeless drivers, lateral motion devices and much sideplay on the outer axles. To limit this problem, the coupled wheels were generally small, up to 64 inches (1,630 mm) in diameter, which in turn generated the problem of insufficient counterweights to balance the weight of the driving rods.

The 2-10-2's inherent problem was the low speed restriction on the type, which was about 35 mph (56 km/h). Further, the 2-10-2 had other inherent restrictions. The massive cylinders that were required on locomotives in the United States for high tractive effort had the result that no reasonably sized valves could admit and exhaust steam at a sufficient rate to permit fast running. In addition the 2-10-2, like the 2-6-2, had its main rod connected to the middle coupled axle, very near to the centre of gravity, which created a violent nosing (waddling) action when operating at speed. The peak of the 2-10-2 design limitations was reached in the United States in 1926 and was overcome with the advent of the superior 2-10-4 design.

== Usage ==
Locomotives with a 2-10-2 wheel arrangement were used in a number of countries around the world, including those in North America, Western Europe, China, the Soviet Union and Africa. Continental Europe saw a fair number of 2-10-2s, although the type was always less popular than 2-8-2 Mikados and 2-10-0 Decapods. A large number of European 2-10-2s were tank locomotives, taking advantage of the symmetrical nature of the wheel arrangement.

=== Argentina ===
The metre gauge General Manuel Belgrano Railway in Argentina operated the E2 series of 2-10-2 locomotives. In 1956, Mitsubishi Heavy Industries of Japan constructed a batch of ten 2-10-2s based on this design for the isolated Ramal Ferro Industrial Río Turbio (RFIRP) 750 mm gauge railway in the southern Patagonian Desert, to haul coal from Río Turbio for shipping from Río Gallegos, Santa Cruz. These required modification by Livio Dante Porta to achieve their full potential. Ten more powerful examples were introduced into service in 1964.

=== Belgian Congo ===
Two classes of 2-10-2 locomotives were used in the Belgian Congo.

- Two locomotives were built by Forges, Usines et Fonderies de Haine-Saint-Pierre for the CF du Congo Superieur aux Grands Lacs Africains in 1937, numbered 60 and 61. They had 510-by-530-millimetre (20 by 21 in) cylinders and 1,060-millimetre-diameter (42 in) coupled wheels, with a working order mass of 64.7 tonnes (63.7 long tons; 71.3 short tons).
- One locomotive was built for the CF du Bas-Congo au Katanga by Société Anonyme John Cockerill in 1947, numbered 901 and later renumbered 802. It had 540-by-550-millimetre (21 by 22 in) cylinders and 1,100-millimetre-diameter (43 in) coupled wheels, with a working order mass of 94.1 tonnes (92.6 long tons; 103.7 short tons), a grate area of 4 square metres (43 sq ft) and a tractive effort at 65% boiler pressure of 14,215 kilograms-force (139.40 kN; 31,340 lbf).

=== Canada ===
In 1916, Canadian Government Railways (CGR) took delivery of ten 2-10-2s built by ALCO. After CGR became part of Canadian National Railways (CNR) in 1918, these locomotives were designated Class T-1-a. Ten more were delivered from the Montreal Locomotive Works in 1918, and another 25 slightly modified T-1-cs in 1920 that were 500 kilograms (1,100 lb) lighter. Canadian Locomotive Company produced five T-2-as in 1924. Ten ALCO's named "T-3-a" were acquired from the Boston and Albany Railroad in 1928. Canadian Locomotive Company produced the last series of 2-10-2s for CNR, a batch of 15 T-4-as in 1929, and 18 T-4-bs in 1930.

The 2-10-2s began to be scrapped in the mid-1950s, with the last models being used until 1961. There are two surviving CNR 2-10-2 locomotives. One is No. 4008, on display at the CNR Station in Rainy River, Ontario, and the other is No. 4100, on display at the Canadian Railway Museum in Delson, Quebec.

=== China ===
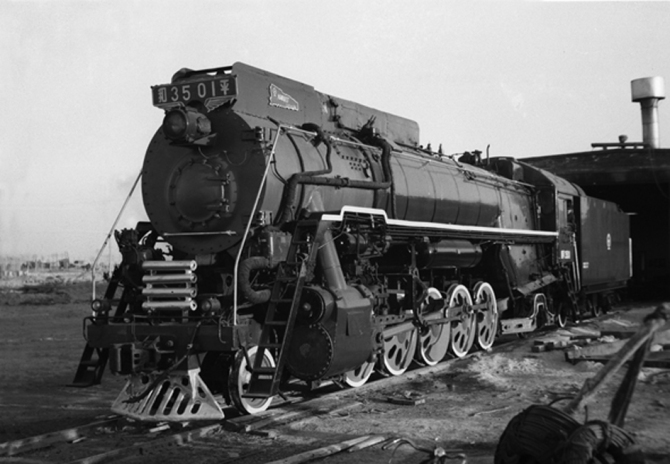
The first QJ class locomotive

The mainstay of Chinese steam was their 2-10-2 locomotives. This was the wheel arrangement of the Chinese QJ class locomotives that were based on the Soviet locomotive class LV and built by Datong Locomotive Works from 1959. They were produced until 1988 and were still in widespread service until the final steam runs in 2005.

After retirement, some of these QJ class locomotives found their way to the United States, where they are used in revenue freight and excursion service. In Train Festival 2011, Multipower International restored two Chinese locomotives to Federal Railroad Administration (FRA) Part 230 specifications and delivered them to the Railroad Development Corporation.

=== Germany ===
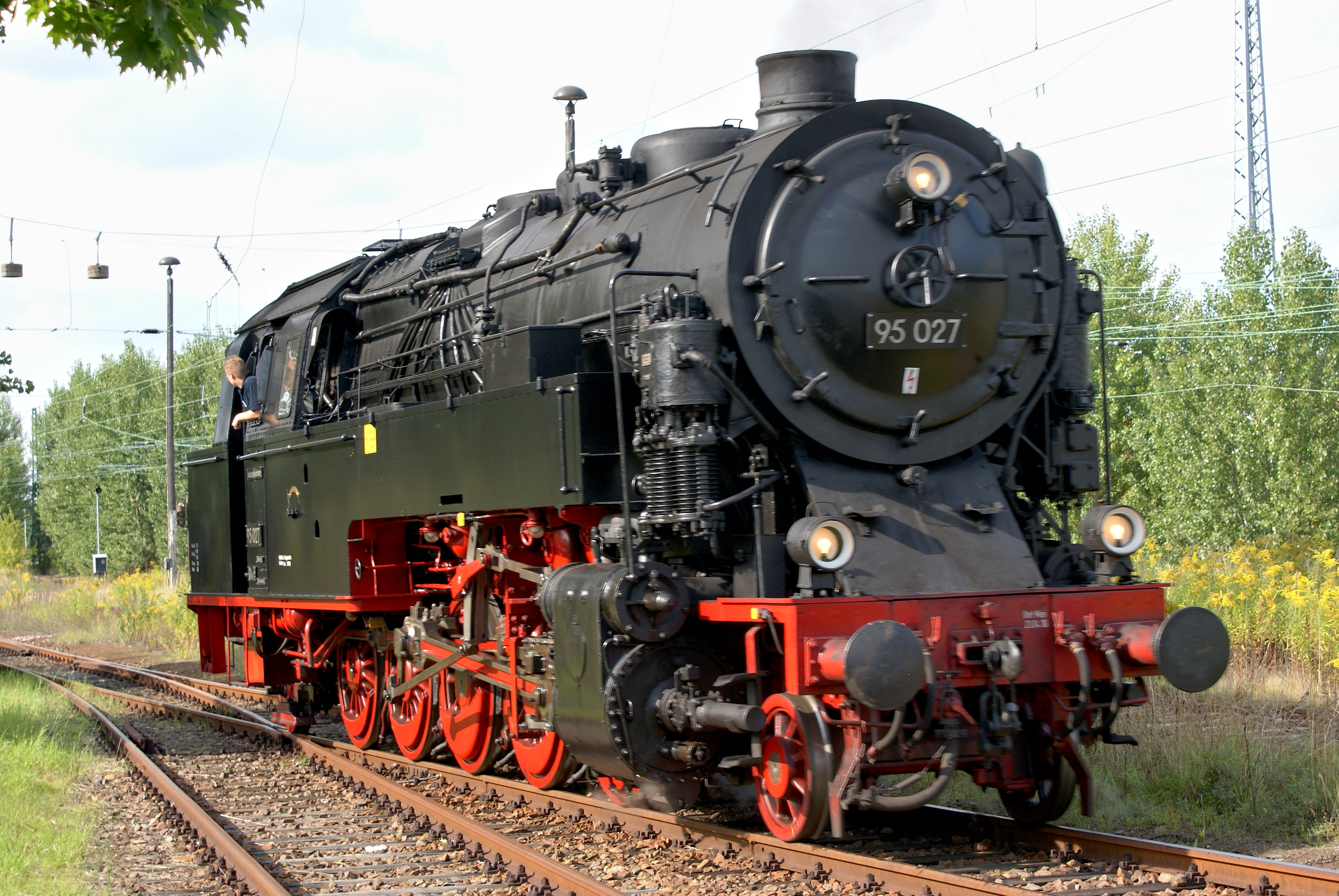
Prussian T 20, class BR95

Examples on the German railway systems included classes BR84 and BR85, both standard tank locomotive designs built in 1935 and 1937 respectively, and class BR95, a tank locomotive built in 1922 by the Prussian State Railways as the Prussian T 20.

From 1936, the German railways built 28 three-cylinder 2-10-2 tender freight locomotives of class BR45, which were the most powerful steam locomotives on the system.

Further examples, still in regular service, are the metre-gauge DR Class 99.23-24 on the Harz Narrow Gauge Railways and the 750 mm-gauge DR Class 99.77-79 on the Rügen narrow-gauge railway.

=== Greece ===
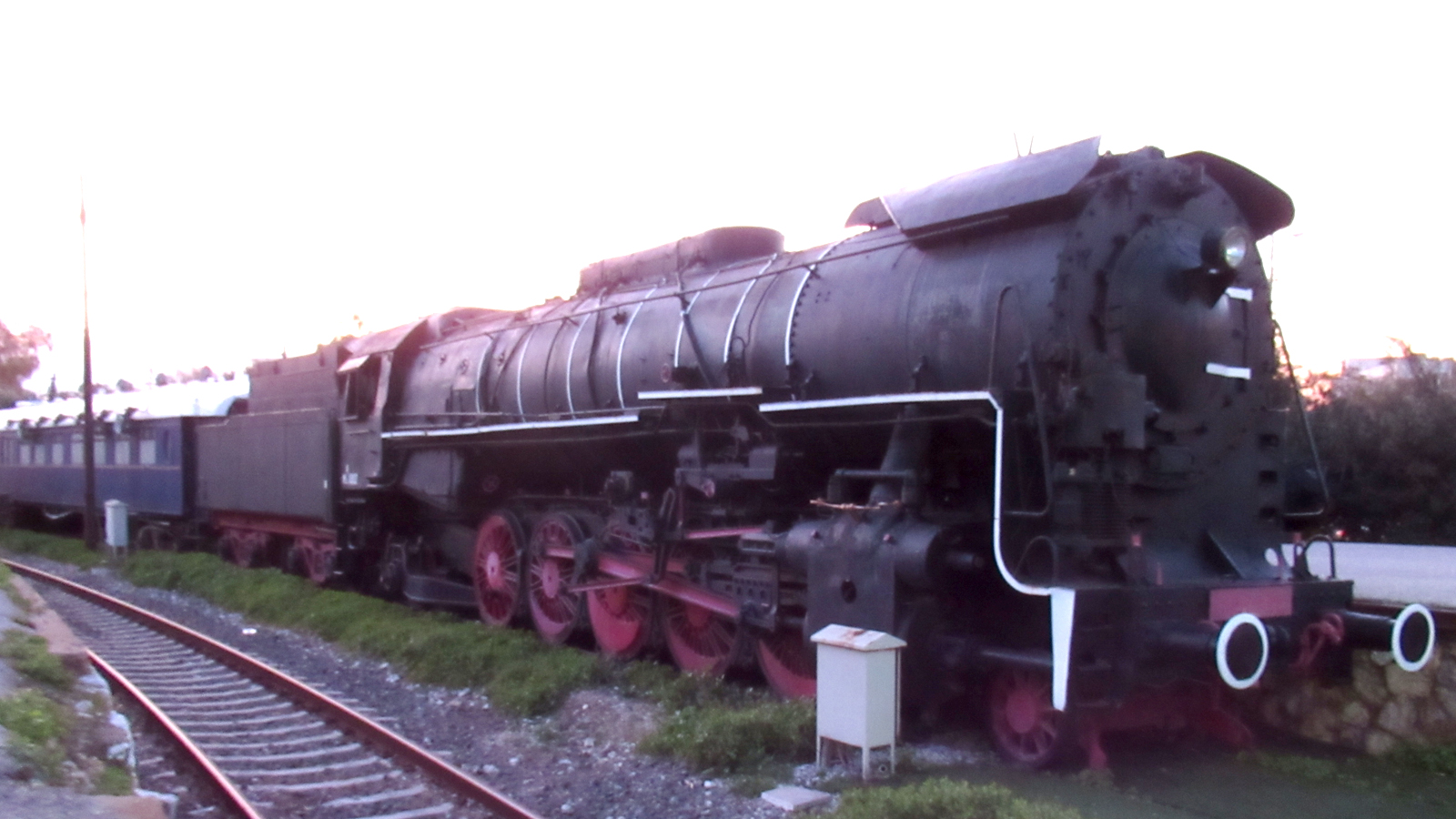
SEK class Μα

SEK (Sidirodromoi Ellinikou Kratous, Hellenic State Railways) class Μα (or class Ma; Mu-alpha) was a class of 2-10-2 steam locomotives built by Ansaldo and Breda in 1953. They were numbered Μα 1001-1020.

The Μα locomotives were the last steam locomotives acquired by SEK before conversion to diesel traction. They were designed and built in Italy by Breda (10 units) and Ansaldo (10 units) in 1953–1954, while some parts (including whole tender underframes) were made by Nuove Reggiane. The length of the locomotive with the tender was 24.93 m, the maximum height 4.51 m and service weight 136 t. The boiler operated at 18 bars (1.8 MPa; 260 psi), and their rated power was 2,950 horsepower (2.20 MW). Maximum speed was 90 km/h.

Due to various technical problems, only two years after introduction they were modified by Henschel (1957–1958). The boilers were converted to burn heavy fuel oil.

These locomotives were based at Aghios Ioannis Rentis and Thessaloniki depots and were used mainly for freight trains and for some express passenger trains on Piraeus–Thessaloniki and Thessaloniki–Idomeni mainlines until the early 1970s, when they were withdrawn by the Hellenic Railways Organisation (successor of SEK) due to complete conversion to diesel traction.

Only two examples survived the 1984-1985 steam locomotives scrappings. One of them, 1002 was set on display as part of the theatre Το Τρένο στο Ρουφ (Greek for 'The Train at Rouf'), at Rouf station in Athens. The other one is at Thessaloniki old railway station, not preserved.

=== India ===
The Bombay Port Trust had a pair of 2-10-2 tank locomotives, numbered 25H and 26H, for hump shunting, weighing in at 105.5 tons. Built by Nasmyth, Wilson and Company in 1922, they had 4 ft 3 in (1.30 m) driving wheels, and 23.5 in × 26 in (600 mm × 660 mm) cylinders. Both were withdrawn and scrapped in 1976.

=== Mozambique ===
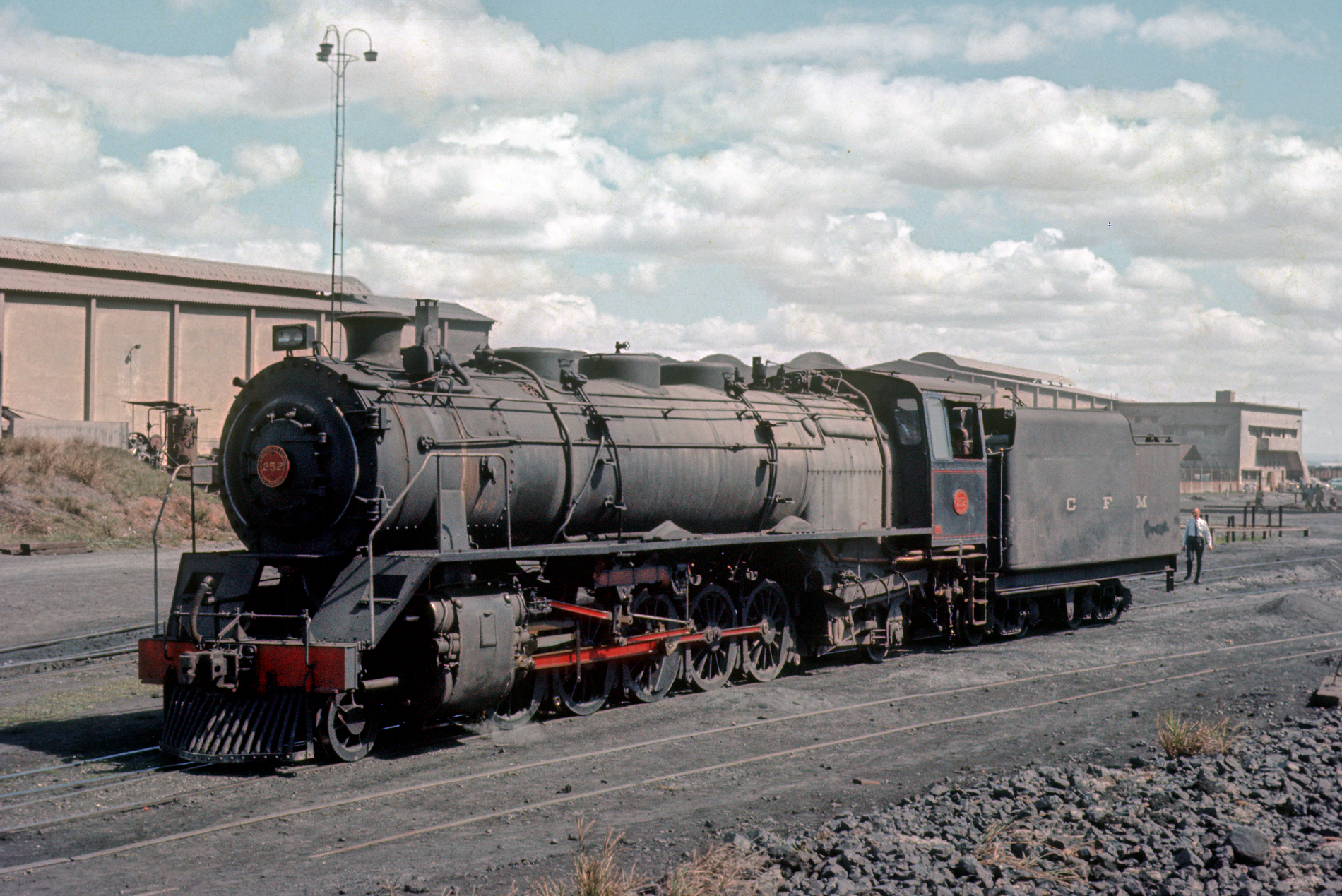
CFM Class 250 2-10-2 No. 252

While the 2-10-2 wheel arrangement was not very common in Africa, the Lourenco Marques system in Mozambique (Caminhos de Ferro de Moçambique or CFM) had altogether 37 locomotives of this type, in three classes.

- Nine locomotives of the Series 200, numbered 201 to 209, were built by Baldwin Locomotive Works between 1915 and 1919.
- Six more Santa Fe type locomotives of the Series 214, numbered 214 to 219, were built by Henschel and Son in 1951.
- Twenty-two locomotives of the Series 250, numbered 251 to 272, were built by Henschel in 1955.

=== Philippines ===
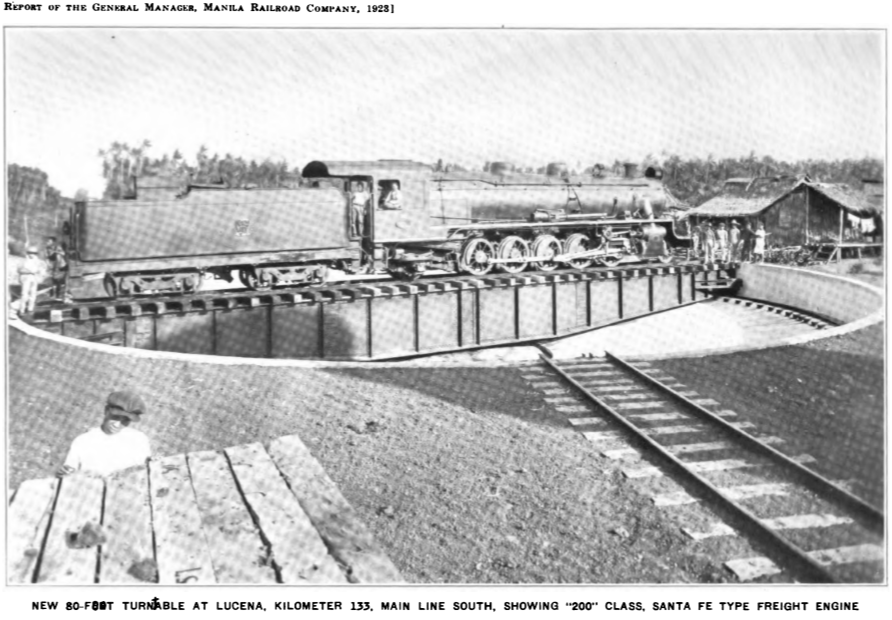
MRR 200 class on a turntable in Lucena, Quezon.

The Manila Railroad Company (now the Philippine National Railways) acquired ten 200-class locomotives in 1922 from the American Locomotive Company (Alco) and was purchased alongside the 4-8-2 170-class. Based on Henry Kirke Porter's acclaimed design of the 45 class, these were intended to replace the original Scottish-built tank locomotives as well as a small group of 4-4-2 tender locomotives that were acquired from the company's predecessors.

They were serviced to haul heavy freight trains on the South Main Line between Manila and Lucena. This class also had one of the largest cylinders of any unarticulated Cape-gauge locomotive according to Alco, but it comparatively had small boilers and grills. Their arrival also called for larger 80-foot (24 m) turntables in both ends of the line, making them some of the largest and most powerful locomotives that entered Philippine service.

Out of ten locomotives, four managed to survive World War II, all of which were still in active service in 1952. However, these locomotives were retired after the MRR turned to upgrading its fleet to diesel locomotives in 1956. Not a single unit was preserved.

=== Poland ===
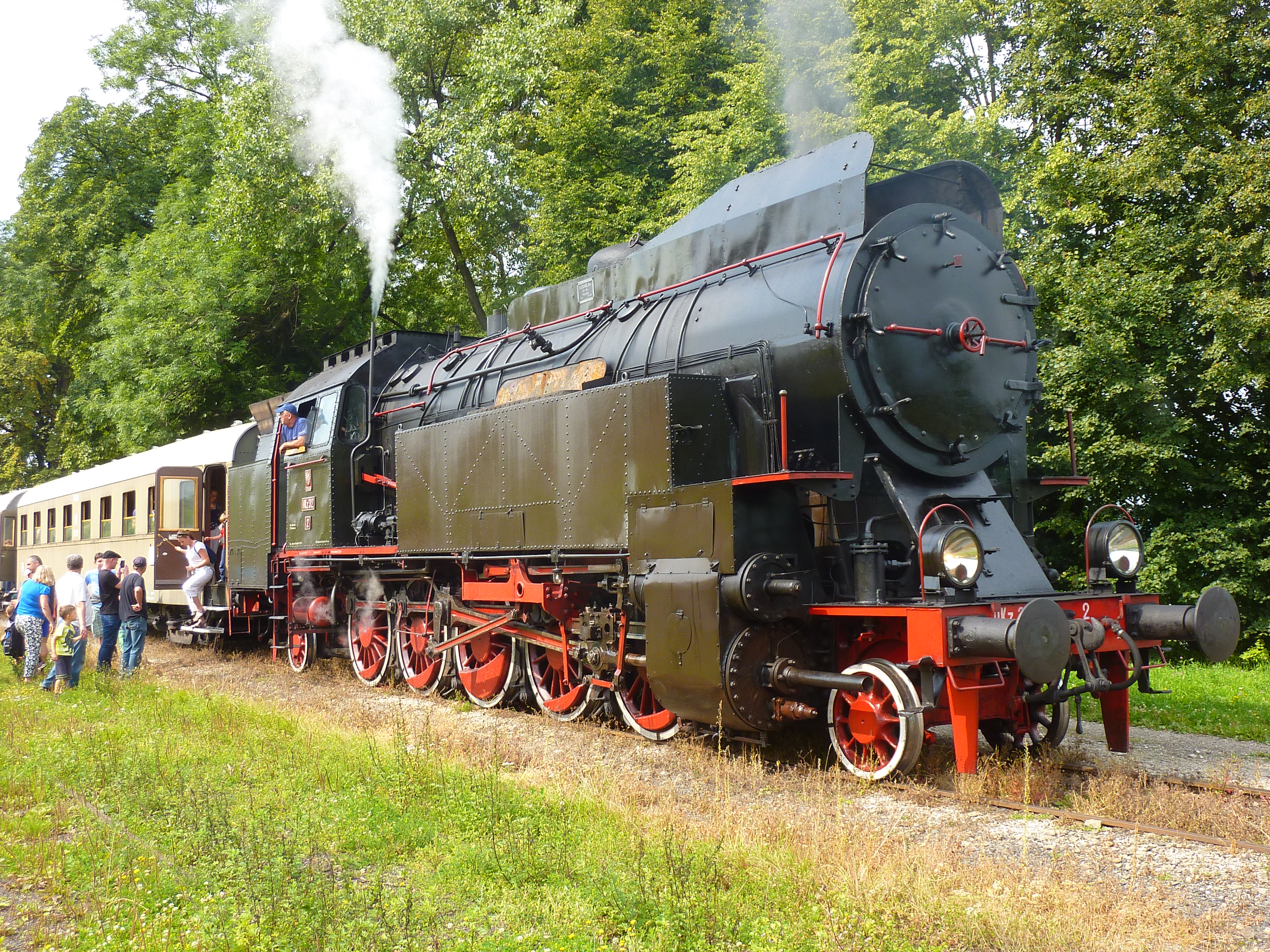
PKP Class OKz32

Twenty-five OKz32 2-10-2 tank locomotives were built by H. Cegielski – Poznań and delivered to PKP between 1934 and 1936. They were used mainly to work passenger trains between Kraków and Zakopane, a difficult railway line, steep in places, with many sharp curves, and requiring three direction changes. One has been preserved in working condition.

=== Romania ===
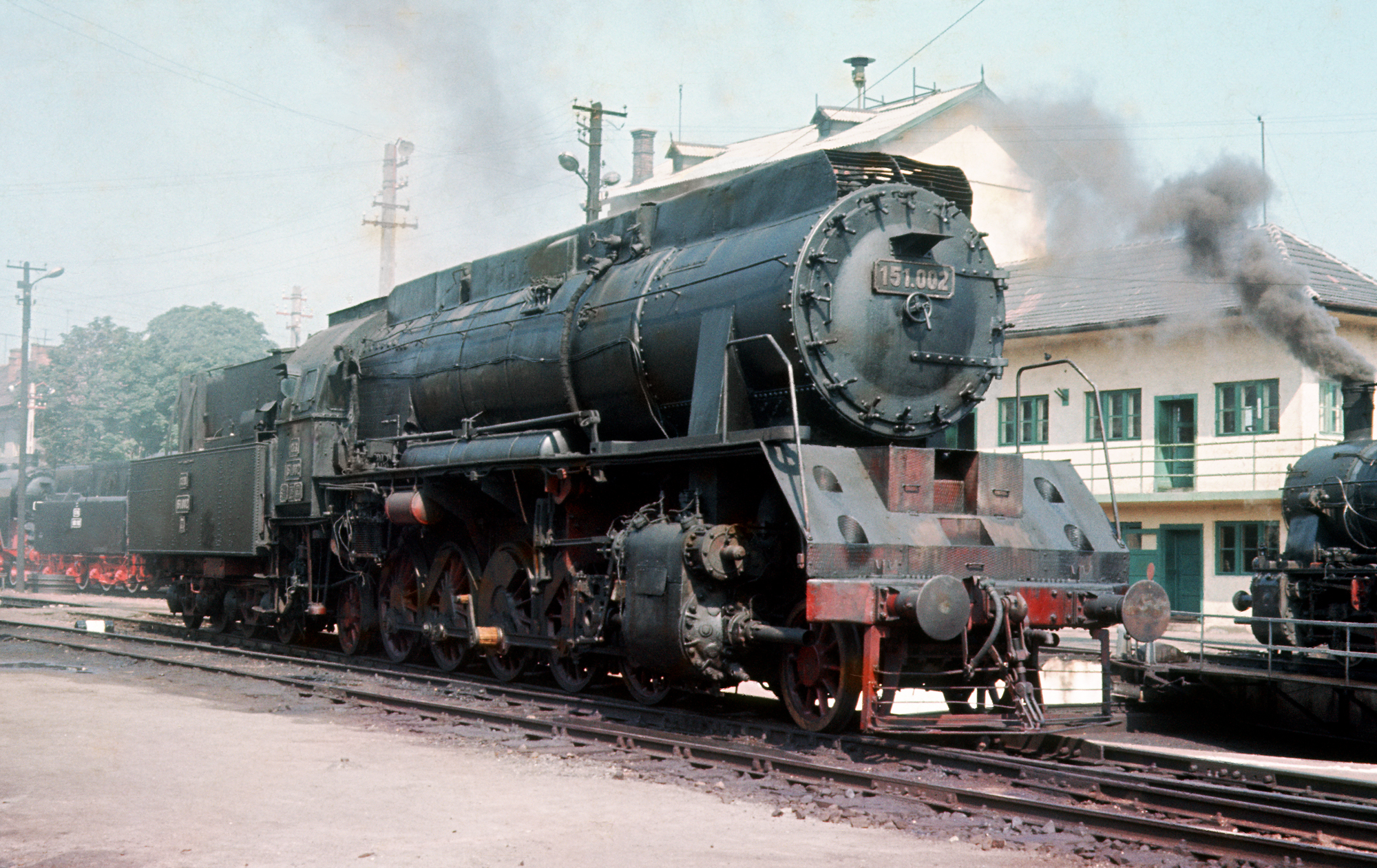
CFR 151.000 no. 151.002 at Cluj Depot

Romania designed its 151.000 Class as freight locomotives to serve on the Căile Ferate Române (CFR). These locomotives used a straightforward two-cylinder 650-by-720-millimetre (26 in × 28 in) engine with 1,500-millimetre-diameter (59 in) coupled wheels and a total weight in working order of 123 tonnes (121 long tons; 136 short tons). The heating surface of the boiler was 254.8 square metres (2,743 sq ft), of which 98.5 square metres (1,060 sq ft) were superheated, while the grate area was 4.72 square metres (50.8 sq ft). At a tractive effort of 21,294 kilograms-force (208.82 kN; 46,950 lbf), they were the most powerful steam locomotives built in Romania.

Two of these locomotives were built by the Malaxa Works in 1939 and 1941, numbered 151.001 and 151.002. Number 151.002 was preserved.

=== South Africa ===
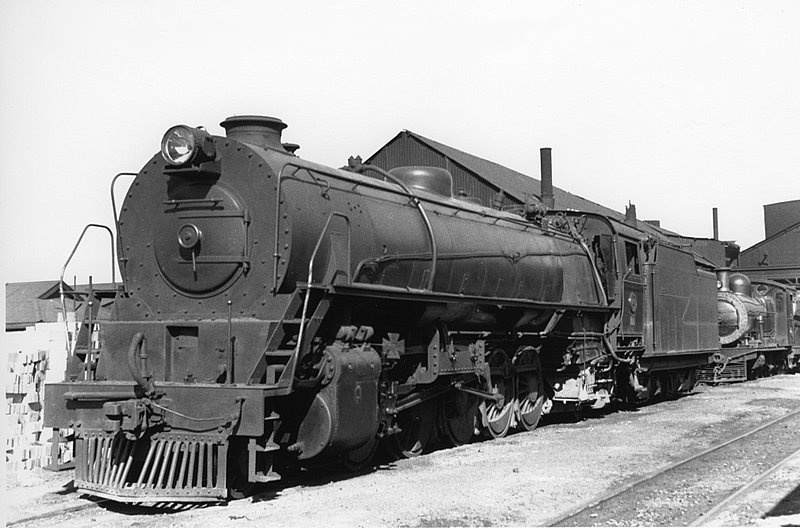
SAR Class 18

On 3 ft 6 in (1,067 mm) Cape gauge, this wheel arrangement was first used by the South African Railways (SAR) in 1927. Two Class 18 steam locomotives, the most powerful non-articulated locomotives to see service on the SAR, were introduced on the line between Witbank and Germiston in an attempt to ease problems that were being experienced with increasingly heavy coal trains. It was designed by Colonel F.R. Collins DSO, Chief Mechanical Engineer of the SAR from 1922 to 1929, and built by Henschel and Son in Germany. They were three-cylinder locomotives, with the two outer cylinders using Walschaerts valve gear and the inner cylinder using Gresley conjugated valve gear, actuated by the motions of the outer cylinders.

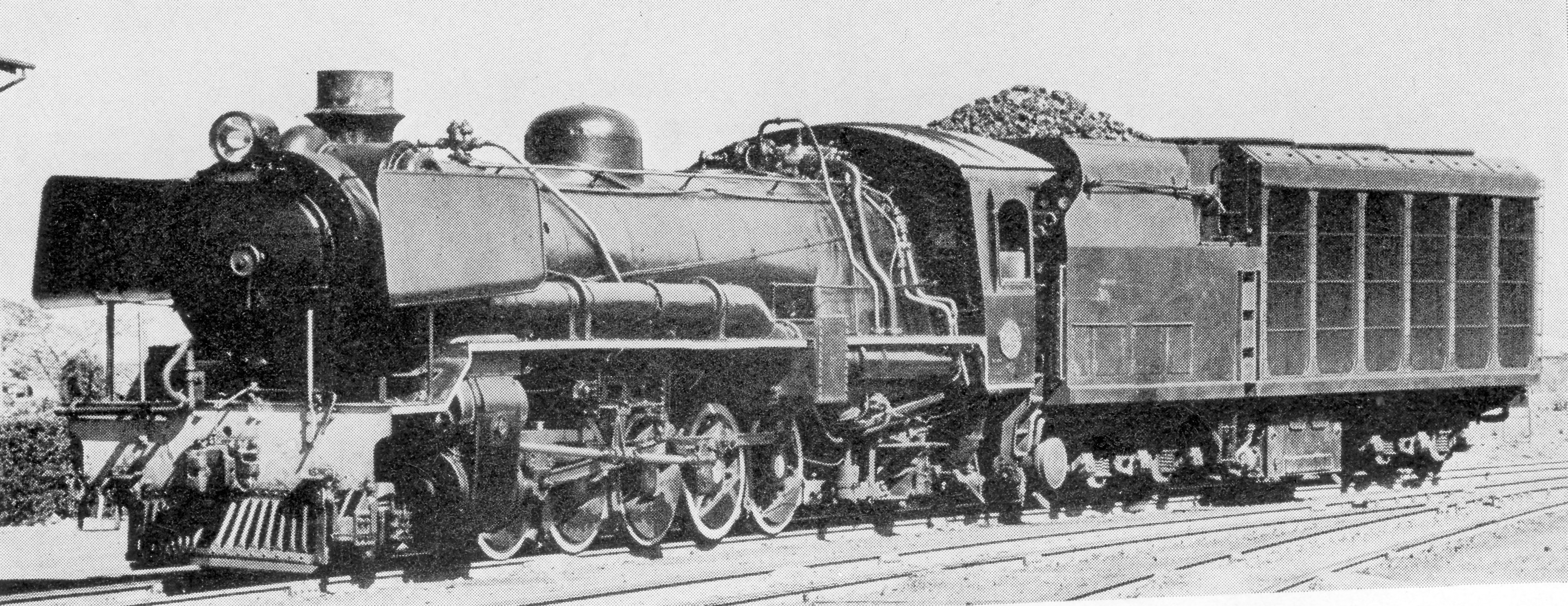
SAR Class 20 as experimental condensing locomotive

One more 2-10-2 locomotive, the Class 20, was designed for branch line work on light rail by A.G. Watson, Chief Mechanical Engineer from 1929 to 1936. Only one locomotive was built by the SAR at its Pretoria Mechanical Shops at Salvokop in 1935.

In 1950, this sole Class 20 locomotive was modified to an experimental condensing locomotive, equipped with a condensing tender that was ordered from Henschel in Germany in 1948. Beginning in 1951, tests with the condensing Class 20 were conducted in the Eastern Transvaal and the Karoo. The positive results of the condensing trials proved the viability of condensing locomotives in South Africa and led to the introduction of the Class 25 4-8-4 condensing locomotive fleet in 1953.

=== Soviet Union ===
In the Soviet Union, 2-10-2 locomotives were used to haul heavy freight trains. Two series were relatively common, the FD (for Felix Dzerzhinsky) with more than three thousand built through the 1930s, and the LV (Lebedyansky, modified by the Voroshilovgrad plant).

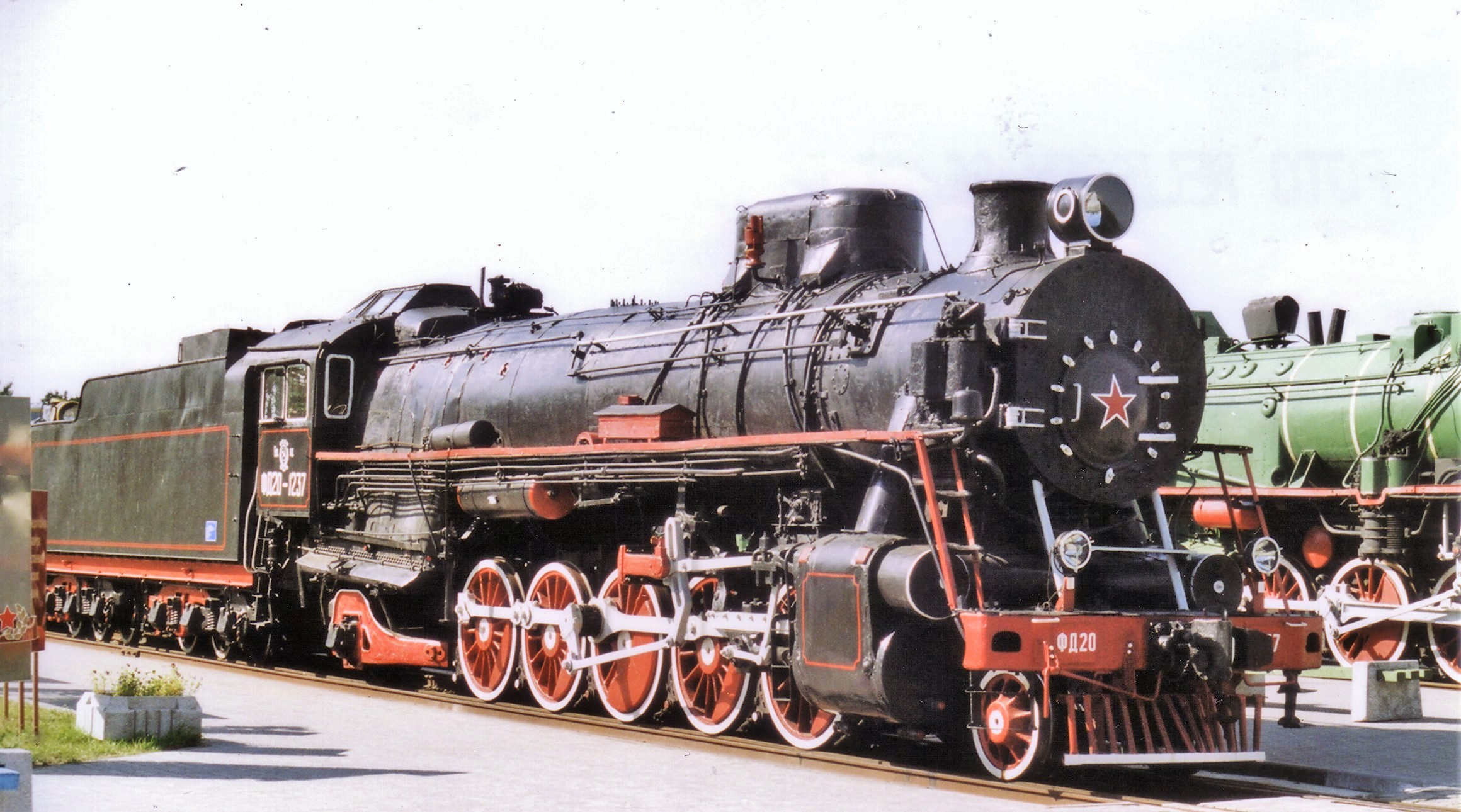
Soviet locomotive class FD 2-10-2 in Brest museum

The FD class was developed from ALCO and Baldwin heavy freight locomotives that were imported to the Soviet Union, where they were designated as the Ta and Tb classes respectively. The first FD class locomotive was built at the Voroshilovgrad Locomotive Plant in 1931.

In 1932, the Voroshilovgrad plant began with the mass production of FD20 locomotives. In the process of production, their construction was improved constantly. Production was interrupted at the outbreak of the Great Patriotic war in 1941 and was only resumed in 1942, when four locomotives were built in Ulan Ude. The total production was 2,927 locomotives of FD20, and 286 locomotives of FD21. The two subclasses only differed in respect of their types of superheater.

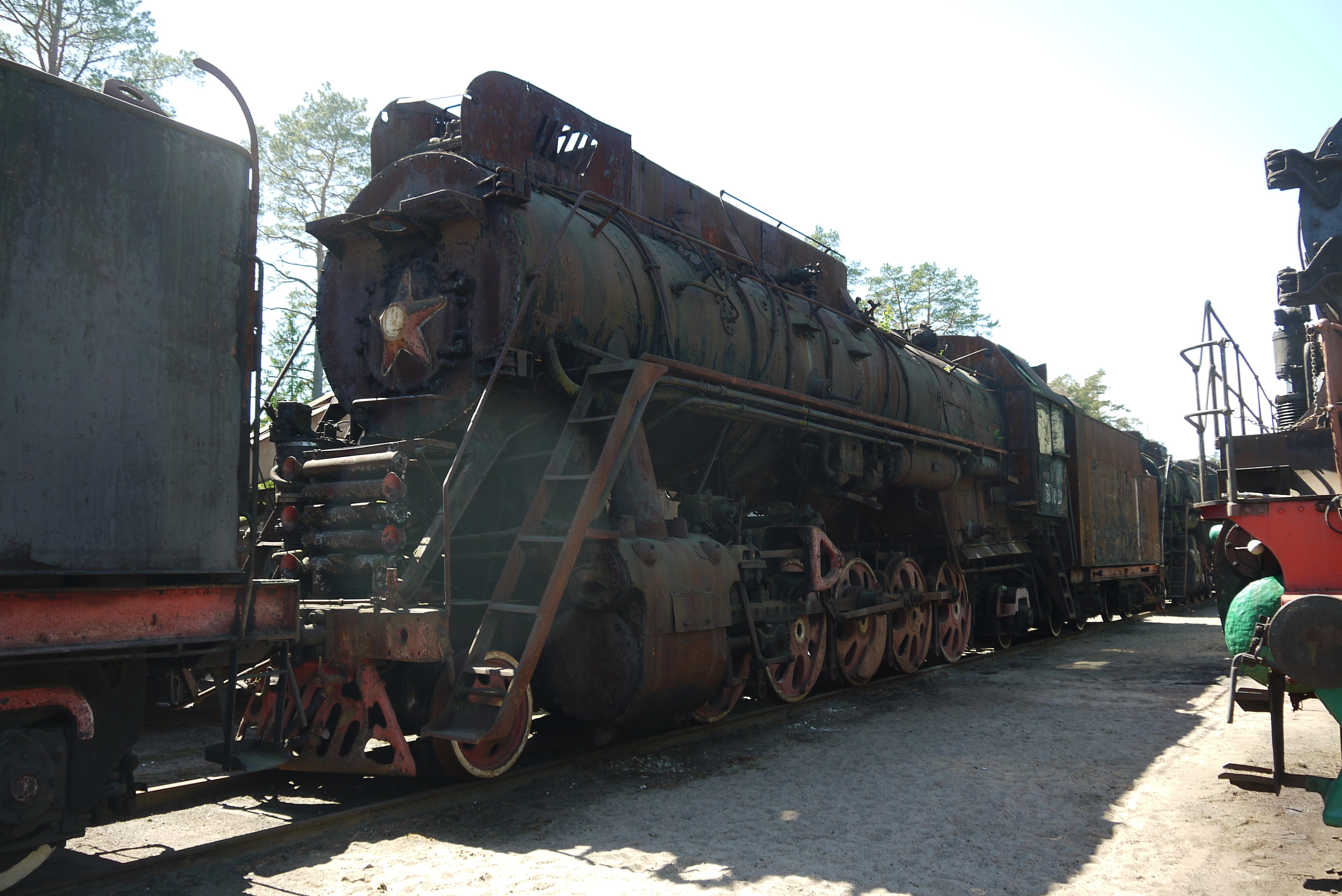
OR18-01 at Lebyazhye Railway Museum

In 1958, 1,054 FD class locomotives were sold to China, where they worked until the 1980s. A much lesser number were sold to North Korea at around the same time.

The Soviet locomotive class LV was developed from the previous L class 2-10-0 locomotive by the Voroshilovgrad plant. It used a feedwater heater to increase thermal efficiency and was the most efficient freight steam locomotive in the Soviet Union, with thermal efficiency of 9.3%. The first prototype was named OR18-01 (October Revolution plant, 18 ton axle load). A total of 522 LV class locomotives were built. Several were preserved, including the first, OR18-01, and the last, LV-0522.

=== Spain ===
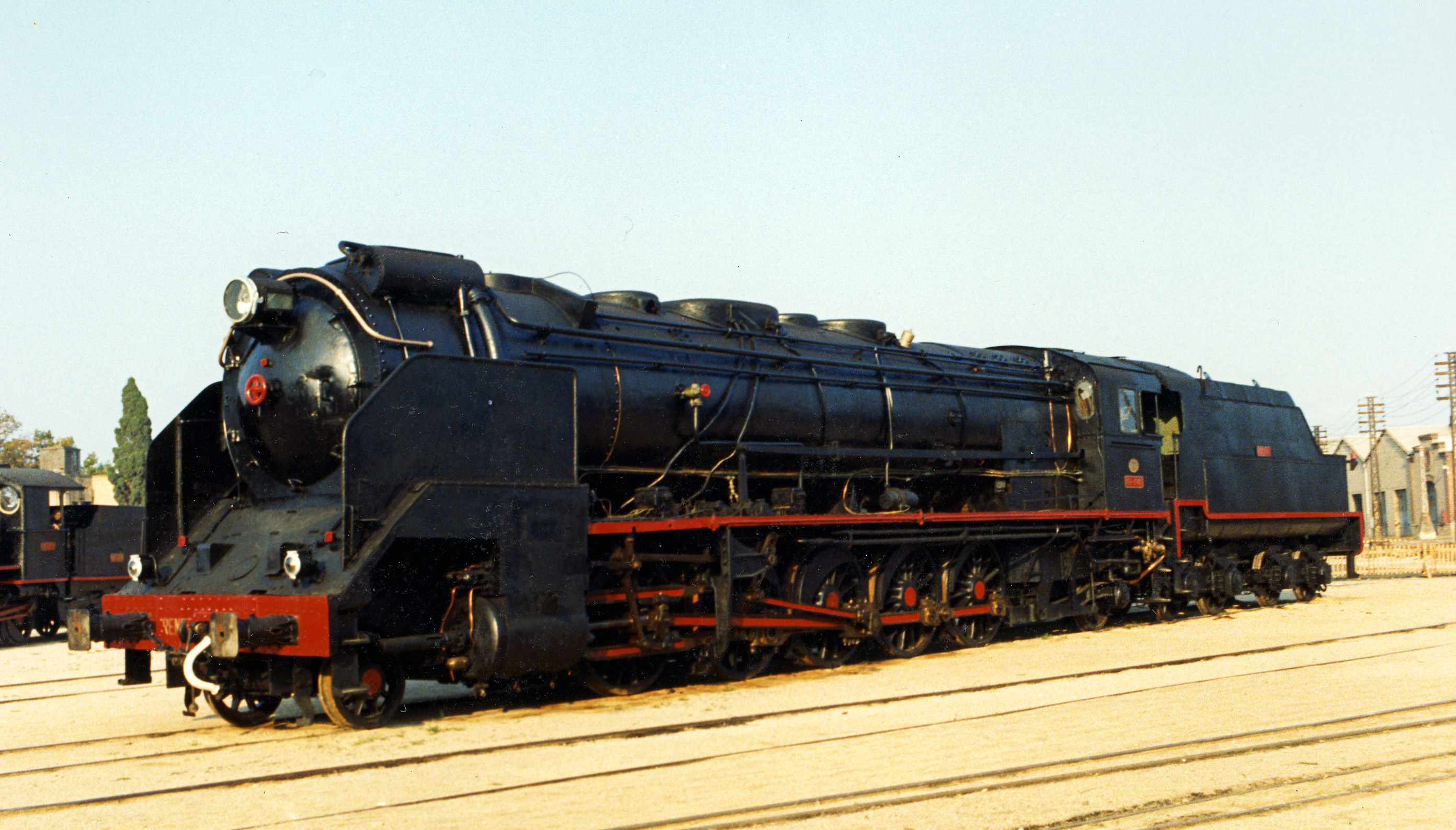
RENFE 151.5001 at Railway Museum of Catalonia

In Spain, the 2-10-2 wheel arrangement was represented by one series of 22 locomotives. They were initially ordered for the Compañía del Norte, but RENFE kept the entire series in reserve. Built between 1941 and 1944 in the La Maquinista Terrestre y Maritima SA factory in Barcelona for hauling heavy coal trains, they were amongst the most powerful steam locomotives in Europe. They had three cylinders, but used simple expansion and were known as Santa Fe locomotives.

=== United States ===
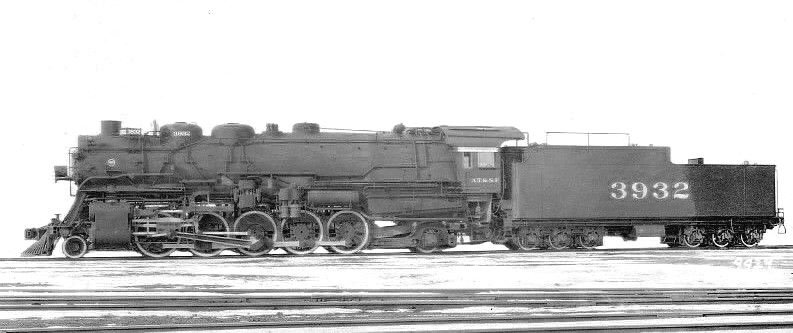
AT&SF 2-10-2 No. 3932

In the United States, the 2-10-2 type was produced between 1903 and 1930. The first were the Atchison, Topeka and Santa Fe Railway (AT&SF) engines of the 900 and 1600 series, which were an early type with few advantages over the 2-10-0 Decapod, save their ability to operate in reverse without derailing. By 1919, the AT&SF was building the definitive type, with the trailing truck supporting a large firebox. These were of the AT&SF 3800 class. One of them, AT&SF engine No. 3829, was equipped with an experimental two-axle trailing truck to become the first 2-10-4 Texas type.

About 2,200 Santa Fe types were built, including about 500 of the two United States Railroad Administration (USRA) First World War standard designs. There were two USRA standard 2-10-2s, the heavy version with an engine weight of 380,000 pounds (170 t) and the light version with an engine weight of 352,000 pounds (160 t). The Santa Fe had the most with 352 engines.

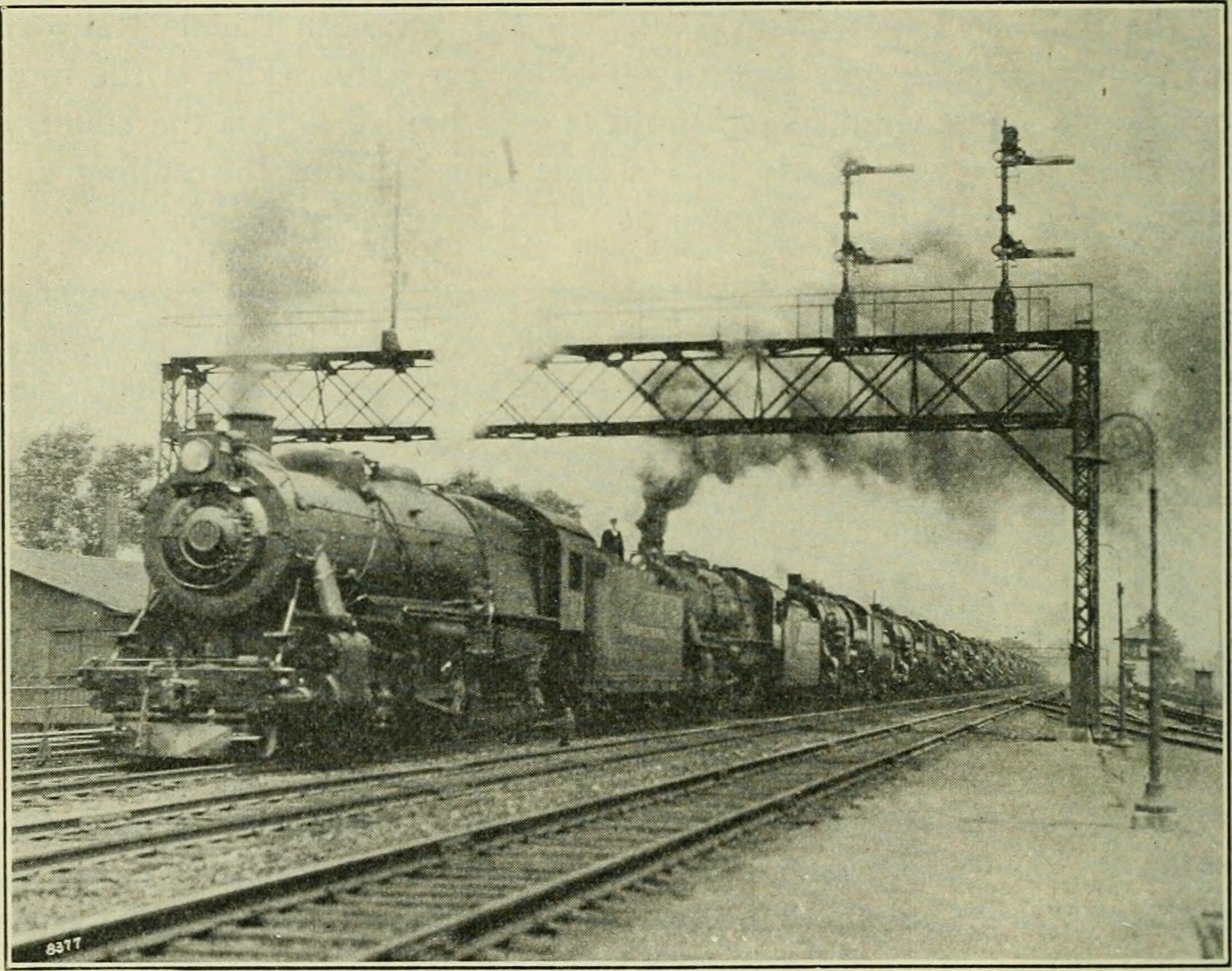
The Prosperity Special underway. The two lead locomotives are not part of the delivery.

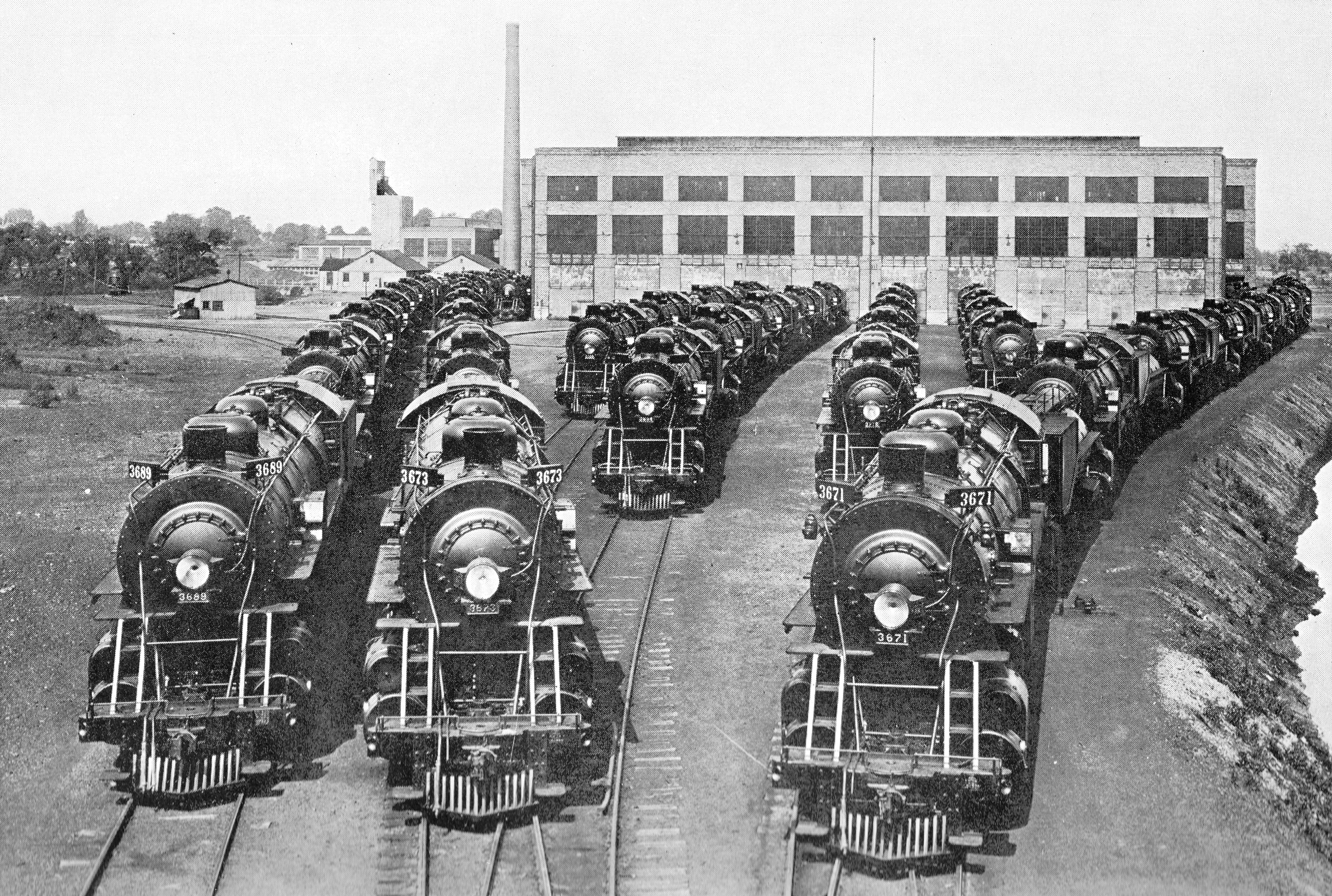
50 SP 2-10-2s at Baldwin

In 1921-22, Baldwin built 50 Southern Pacific class F-4 2-10-2s, twenty of which were taken west in a train billed as the "Prosperity Special", with cheering crowds along the way.

Of the 2-10-2s built for the Santa Fe, only one has been preserved. AT&SF No. 940 is on static display outside the Santa Fe depot, now a Visitor Center, in Bartlesville, Oklahoma.

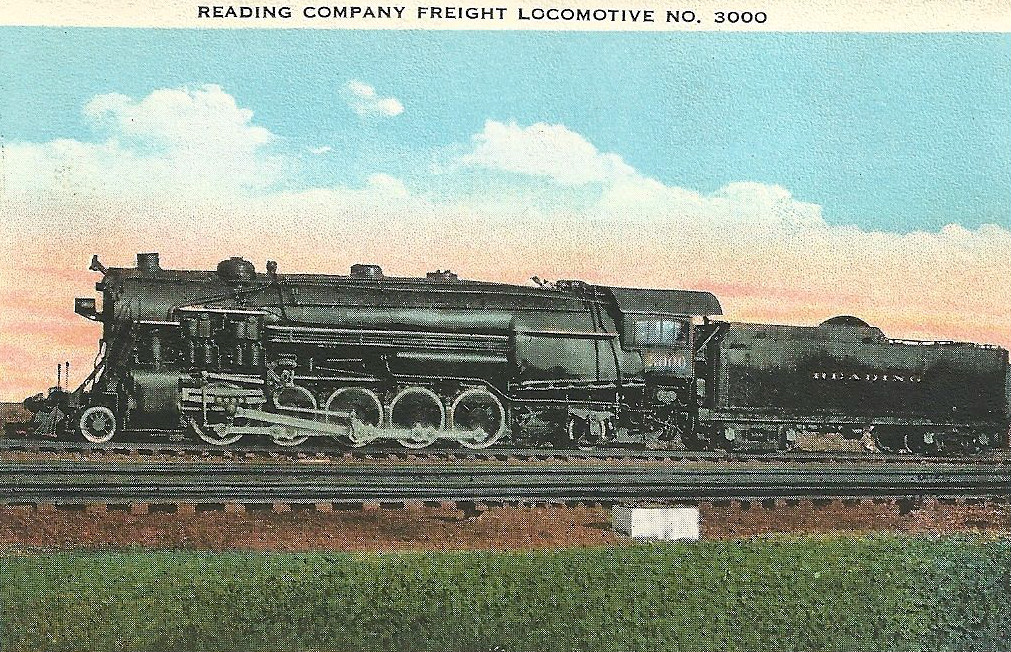
Reading Railway 2-10-2 No. 3000

The heaviest 2-10-2s were ten locomotives built by Baldwin Locomotive Works for the Reading Railway c. 1931, weighing 451,000 pounds (205 t), engine only.

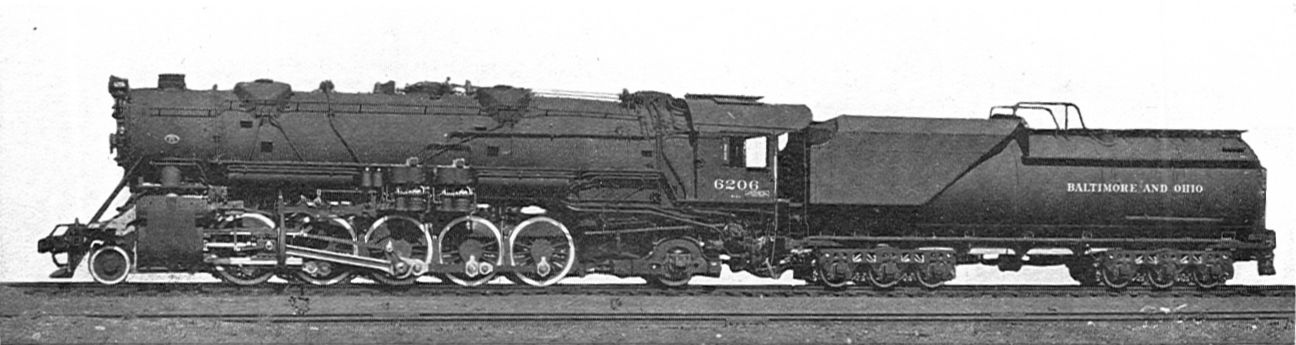
Baltimore and Ohio Railroad 2-10-2 No. 6206

At 104,000 pounds-force (460 kN), the Illinois Central Railroad's 2800 class rebuilds probably had the highest calculated tractive effort of any two-cylinder steam locomotive, although the adhesive weight was only 333,000 pounds (151 t).

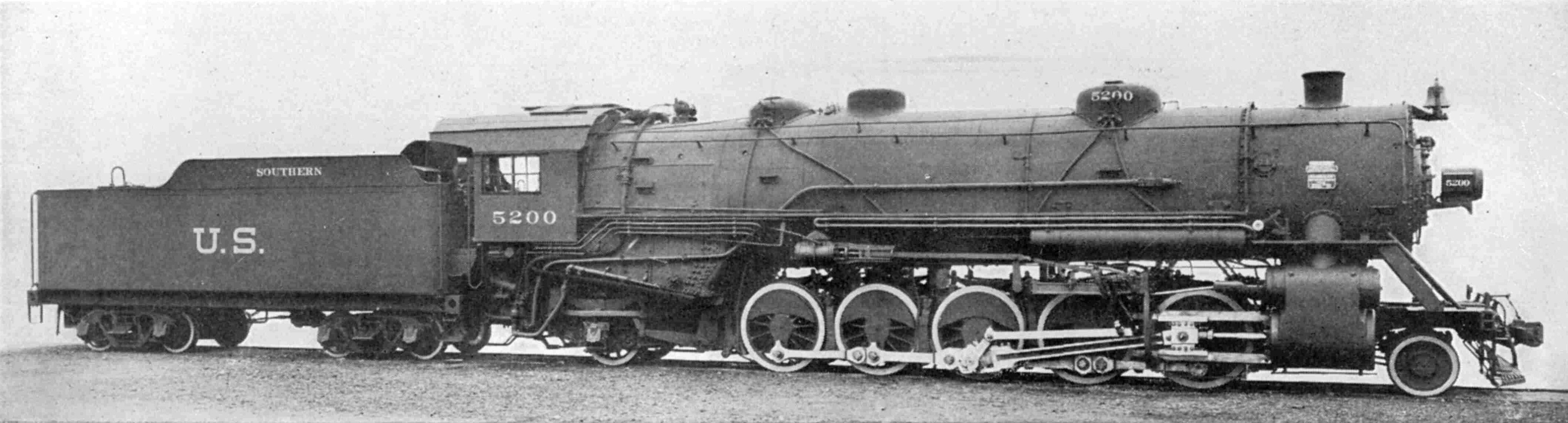
Southern Railway USRA 2-10-2 Light Santa Fe No. 5200

The Baltimore and Ohio Railroad ordered its first 2-10-2 from Baldwin in 1914. From 1914 to 1956, their 2-10-2s bore numbers commencing with 6, hence the nickname "Big Sixes". Designated the S class, there were several sub-classes. The first of the Big Sixes was retired in 1951 and were all scrapped by 1960.

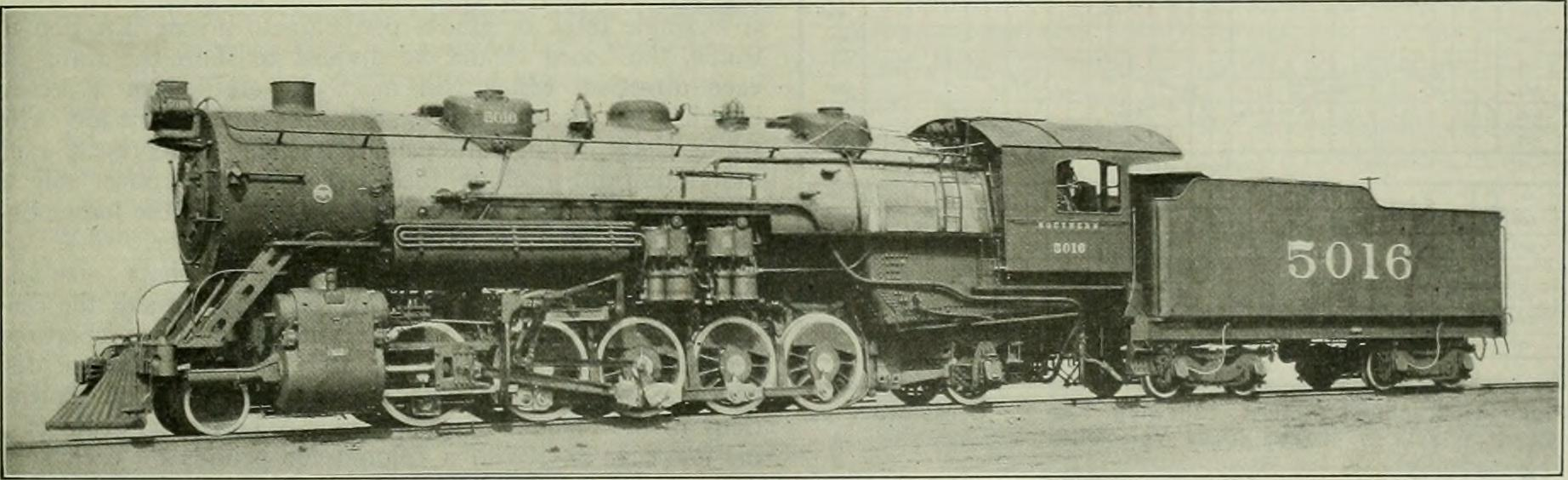
Southern Railway Ss class 2-10-2 No. 5016

The Southern Railway (SOU) ordered its first batches of fifty-five 2-10-2 Ss class steam locomotives (Nos. 5000–5054) from Baldwin in 1917. The second batches of twenty-five 2-10-2s (Nos. 6350–6374) were built by the American Locomotive Company's (ALCO) Richmond Works in 1918 originally for SOU's Cincinnati, New Orleans and Texas Pacific (CNO&TP) division. The latter batches were later moved to the SOU's main division and renumbered to 5055–5079 when they were proved to be too bulky for the CNO&TP tunnels' tight clearances. After receiving the last batches of Ss types, the SOU received fifty more 2-10-2s (Nos. 5200–5249) from ALCO's Brook Works in a USRA Light Santa Fe design which were classified as Ss-1. Both classes were assigned to SOU's Asheville division, hauling and as helpers on heavy freight trains up the steep Saluda Grade and Old Fort Loops in the Blue Ridge Mountains. Between the late 1930s and the early 1950s, all of the Ss and Ss-1 steam locomotives were retired and scrapped with none surviving into preservation.

The Union Pacific Railroad rostered 144 2-10-2 locomotives, under the designation of TTT (Two-Ten-Two). They were divided into classes TTT-1 through TTT-7, but all had the same cylinder dimensions, driving wheel diameter and boiler pressure. Of these, only one locomotive survives; Union Pacific 5511 was donated to the Railroading Heritage of Midwest America, who are as of 2025 restoring the locomotive to operation.

The Denver and Rio Grande Western rostered ten 2-10-2 locomotives, under the class designation of F-81, rostered as Nos. 1400–1409, and purchased from Alco in 1916. None survived into preservation, all of them being scrapped between 1952 and 1955.
