= DRG Class 84 =

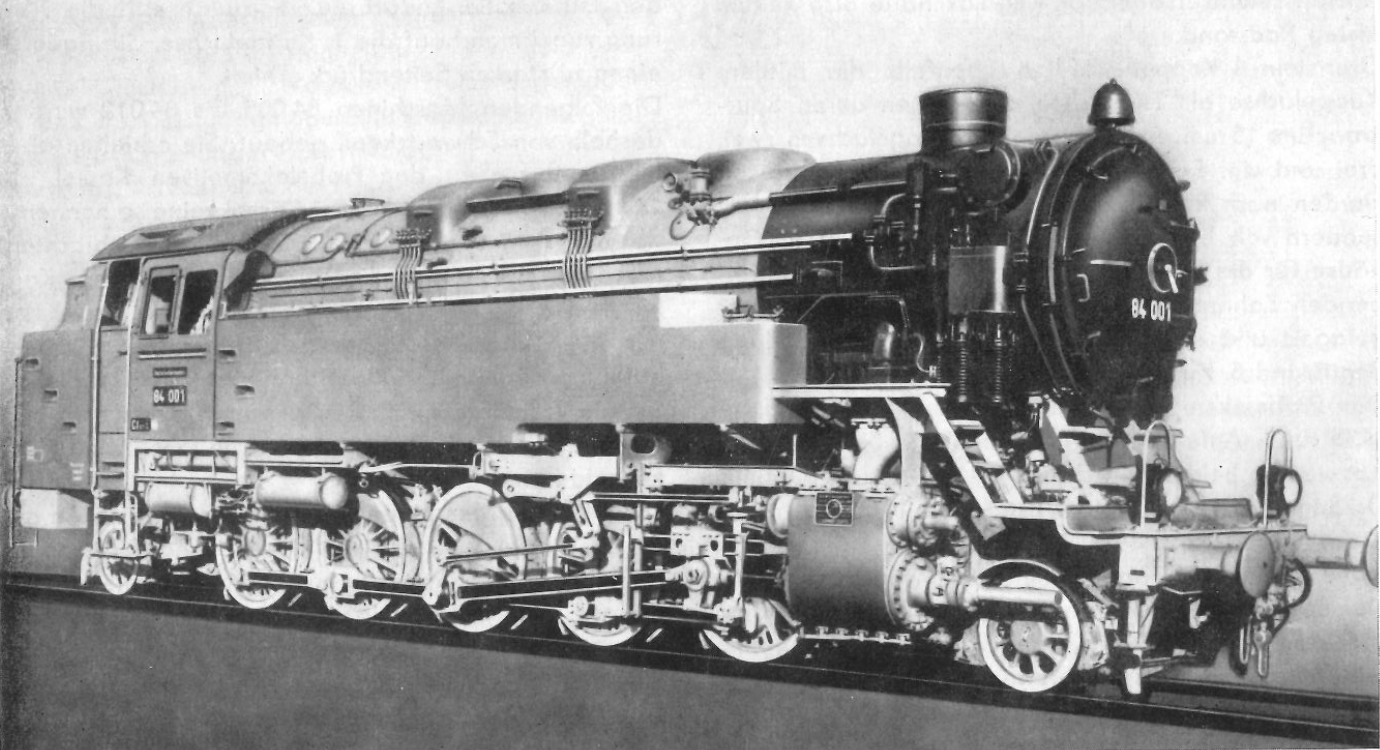
- Works photograph of 84 0001
Type and origin
- Power type: Steam
- Builder: 84 001–002: Berliner Maschinenbau; 84 003–004: Orenstein & Koppel †; 84 005–012: Berliner Maschinenbau ‡
- Build date: 1935–1937
- Total produced: 12
Specifications
- Configuration
  - Whyte: 2-10-2T
  - UIC: 1′E1′ h3t; 1′E1′ h2t †
  - German: Gt 57.18
- Gauge: 1,435 mm (4 ft 8 1/2 in)
- Leading dia.: 850 mm (2 ft 9 1/2 in)
- Driver dia.: 1,400 mm (4 ft 7 1/8 in)
- Trailing dia.: 850 mm (2 ft 9 1/2 in)
- Minimum curve: 100 m (330 ft)
- Wheelbase
  - Axle spacing (Asymmetrical): 2,550 mm (8 ft 4 3/8 in) +; 1,650 mm (5 ft 5 in) +; 1,650 mm (5 ft 5 in) +; 1,650 mm (5 ft 5 in) +; 1,650 mm (5 ft 5 in) +; 2,250 mm (7 ft 4 5/8 in) =; 11,700 mm (38 ft 4 5/8 in); 2,692 mm (8 ft 10 in) + †; 1,708 mm (5 ft 7 1/4 in) +; 1,700 mm (5 ft 6 7/8 in) +; 1,700 mm (5 ft 6 7/8 in) +; 1,708 mm (5 ft 7 1/4 in) +; 2,692 mm (8 ft 10 in) =; 12,200 mm (40 ft 3/8 in) †
- Length
  - Over headstocks: 14,250 mm (46 ft 9 in); 14,650 mm (48 ft 3/4 in) †
  - Over buffers: 15,550 mm (51 ft 1/4 in); 15,950 mm (52 ft 4 in) †
- Height: 4,550 mm (14 ft 11 1/8 in)
- Axle load: 18.3 t (18.0 long tons; 20.2 short tons); 18.0 t (17.7 long tons; 19.8 short tons) †
- Adhesive weight: 91.3 t (89.9 long tons; 100.6 short tons); 89.7 t (88.3 long tons; 98.9 short tons) †
- Empty weight: 100.5 t (98.9 long tons; 110.8 short tons); 100.9 t (99.3 long tons; 111.2 short tons) †
- Service weight: 125.5 t (123.5 long tons; 138.3 short tons); 125.2 t (123.2 long tons; 138.0 short tons) †
- Fuel type: Coal
- Fuel capacity: 3 tonnes (3.0 long tons; 3.3 short tons)
- Water cap.: 14 m^{3} (3,080 imp gal; 3,700 US gal)
- Firebox
  - Grate area: 3.76 m^{2} (40.5 sq ft)
- Boiler
  - Pitch: 3,100 mm (10 ft 2 in)
  - Tube plates: 4,700 mm (15 ft 5 in)
  - Small tubes: 51 mm (2 in), 158 off
  - Large tubes: 133 mm (5 1/4 in), 48 off
- Boiler pressure: 20 bar (20.4 kgf/cm^{2}; 290 psi); 16 bar (16.3 kgf/cm^{2}; 232 psi) ‡
- Heating surface
  - Firebox: 14.2 m^{2} (153 sq ft)
  - Tubes: 107.3 m^{2} (1,155 sq ft)
  - Flues: 88.6 m^{2} (954 sq ft)
  - Total surface: 210.1 m^{2} (2,261 sq ft)
- Superheater
  - Heating area: 85.0 m^{2} (915 sq ft)
- Cylinders: Three; Two, outside †
- Cylinder size: 480 mm × 660 mm (18 7/8 in × 26 in); 600 mm × 660 mm (23 5/8 in × 26 in) †; 500 mm × 660 mm (19 11/16 in × 26 in) ‡
- Valve gear: Heusinger (Walschaerts)
Performance figures
- Maximum speed: 70 km/h (43 mph); 80 km/h (50 mph) ‡
- Indicated power: 1,425 PS (1,050 kW; 1,410 hp)
Career
- Operators: Deutsche Reichsbahn
- Numbers: 84 001 – 84 012
- Retired: 1968

The German DRG Class 84s were standard (see Einheitsdampflokomotive) goods train tank locomotives with the Deutsche Reichsbahn. A total of twelve engines were placed into service by the Reichsbahn between 1935 and 1937. The machines were given operating numbers 84 001–012. They were worked on the Müglitz Valley Railway (Müglitztalbahn) between Heidenau and Altenberg in the Ore Mountains (Erzgebirge), for which they were specially designed to negotiate tight curves. They were manufactured by the firms of Berliner Maschinenbau and Orenstein & Koppel. One feature was that they were Berliner-built locomotives were fitted with Schwartzkopff-Eckhardt II bogies, while the O&K-built had Luttermöller axles.

In the Second World War many of the engines were damaged and had to be sidelined as a result. The vehicles were taken over by the DR in East Germany after the war. The engines were mainly used between Schwarzenberg and Johanngeorgenstadt.

The entire class was withdrawn between 1966 and 1968 apart from one, and all were scrapped.

== See also ==
- List of DRG locomotives and railbuses
