= Ahrentsklint =

Rock formation in Saxony-Anhalt, Germany

Coordinates: 51°46′23.4″N 10°40′1″E

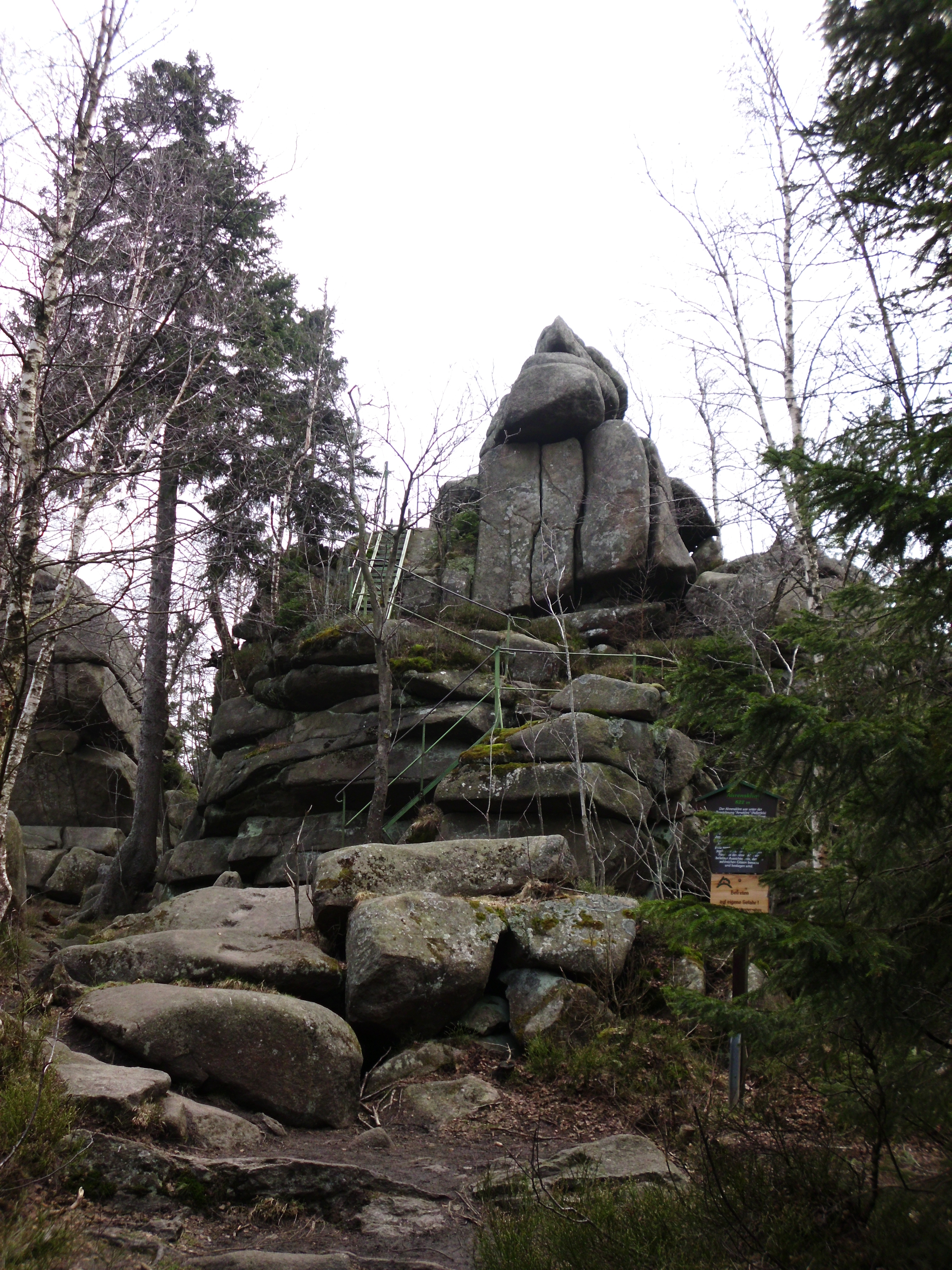
Ahrentsklint

The Ahrensklint or Ahrentsklint (also called the Ahrentsklintklippe) in the Harz Mountains is a granite rock formation, 822.4 m above sea level (NN), on the Erdbeerkopf in Harz district in the German state of Saxony-Anhalt.

== Geographic location ==
The Ahrentsklint lies in the Upper Harz (High Harz) inside the Harz/Saxony-Anhalt Nature Park in the Harz National Park. It is located north of the village of Schierke (part of Wernigerode) about 800 metres west of the Erdbeerkopf mountain (847.7 m above NN) on the southwestern flank of the Hohnekamm (900.6 m above NN). The Cold Bode flows through Schierke past the southwestern flanks of the mountain on the far side of the Brocken Railway that runs up its side. It is at the head of the "Valley of Witches" (Tal der Hexen).

== History ==
„Under the name of "Arneklint" ("eagle rock"), the Ahrentsklint was the oldest name of a forest site in the Schierke region. Before 1411, it belonged to the Wernigerode community. On 28.1.1411, the Count of Stolberg Wernigerode exchanged the forest site in order to consolidate his forestry and hunting estate. From then on the Ahrenstklint belonged to the comital forest and was the venue of prestigious court hunting expeditions of the feudal Harz counts. …“

== Hiking and views ==
The Ahrentsklint can only be reached on woodland paths. The Glassworks Way (Glashüttenweg) runs past the rocks which may be scaled on several iron ladders. From the highest point there are views of the Brocken, the Hohnekamm with its tors, the Leistenklippe and Grenzklippe, the Erdbeerkopf, the Wurmberg and nearby Schierke. About 2 km further east, towards Drei Annen Hohne, lies the Trudenstein tor, also on the Glassworks Way, on the far side of the Erdbeerkopf.

The Ahrentsklint is no. 13 in the system of checkpoints in the Harzer Wandernadel hiking network. It is on the themed walks, the Harz Witches' Trail and the Goethe Way.

== See also ==
- Harzklippen
