= Eckerloch =

Coordinates: 51.7850°N 10.6178°E

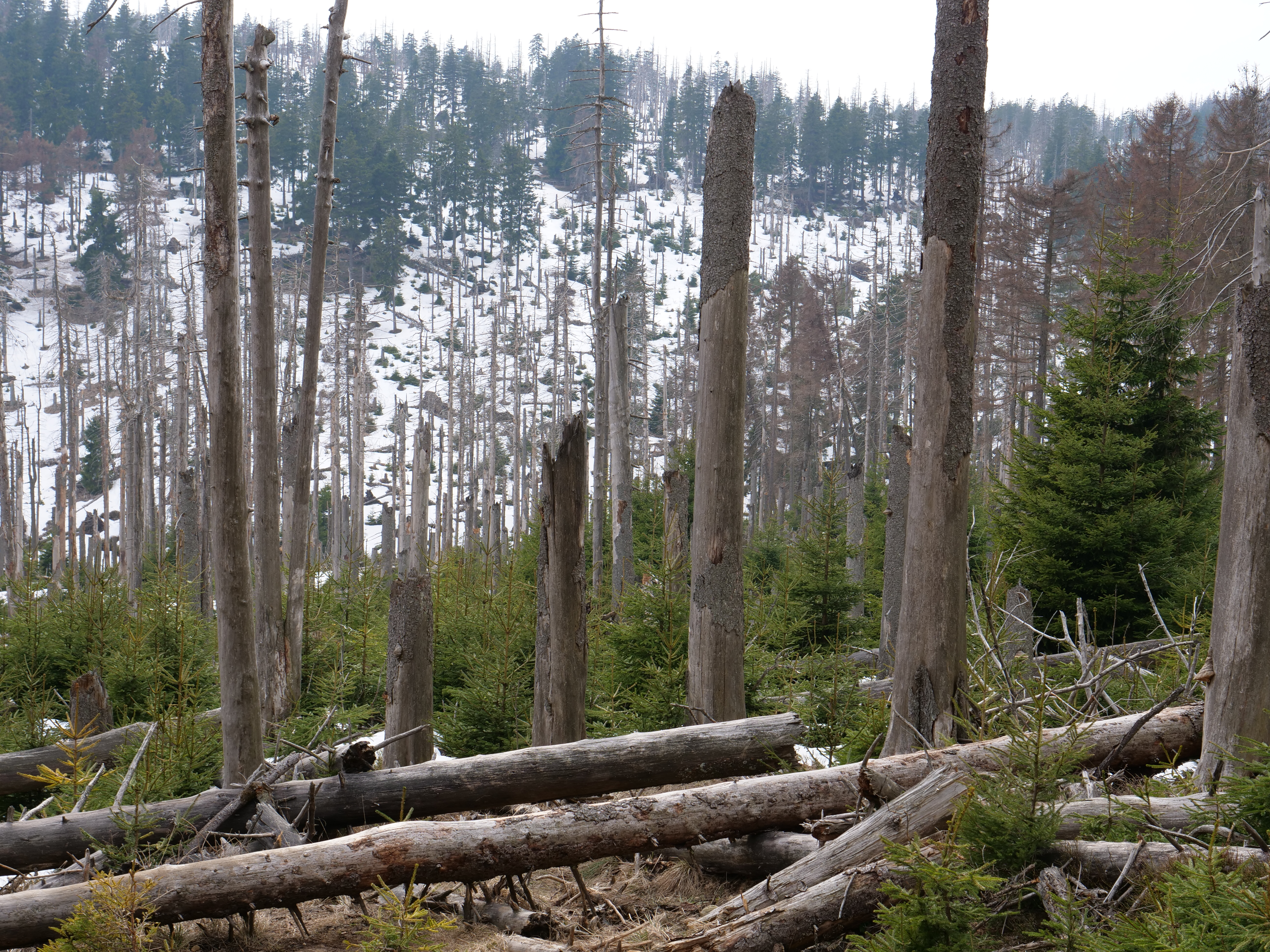
View from the Eckerlochstieg

The Eckerloch is a forested mountain valley, 845 metres above sea level near the village of Schierke in the Harz Mountains of central Germany.

== Location ==
The Eckerloch valley runs downhill from northwest to southeast and lies about 1½ kilometres due south of the highest mountain in the Harz, the Brocken. Its small unnamed stream runs into the Cold Bode To the west is the mountain of Königsberg (1,033 metres) with a long southeast-running ridge with several crags and tors. To the east is the Heinrichshöhe (1,039 metres) a southeast spur of the Brocken massif.

== History ==
The Eckerloch was the site of one of several Harz granite quarries in the vicinity of Schierke.

In the 1920s the locals built the first ski jump on the Eckerloch, with the permission of the chamber of the prince of Stolberg-Wernigerode. The site was chosen due to it good snow conditions after the ski jump on the southern slopes of the Erdbeerkopf had been abandoned. It became one of the well-known jumps in the Harz.

In 1950 the first East German ski jumping championships took place here on a new jump, but it was soon abandoned due to its proximity to the Inner German Border and was demolished in the 1970s.

The Brocken Railway had a station built here for the ski jumping championships, but it was closed immediately afterwards and is now just a request stop. After a tight left hand bend before the Eckerloch Bridge and another right-hander, the line reaches Goetheweg station (956 m), which is now only used as a locomotive depot.

== Hiking ==
The Eckerloch is on one of the most scenic hiking trails in the Harz. The Old Königsberg Way (alte Königsbergweg), one of two trails that ran to the top of the Königsberg mountain, began near Eckerloch and ran uphill, alongside the old Königsberg Quarry, up to the Kanzelklippen crags. From there it ran over the Rabenklippe, the old Eckerloch ski jump, towards the Kesselklippe and then through the Goethe Moor to the station at Goetheweg. It ran along the entire ridge to the Hirschhornklippen.

There is a rest area here along with a checkpoint here (No. 11) in the Harzer Wandernadel hiking system.
