= Goethe Way =

Goethe Way (German: Goetheweg) is the name given to a number of footpaths or trails that run through various regions in Germany and the Alps (e.g. through the Harz mountains, Thuringian Forest, Alps) as well as a railway station (Goetheweg station) on the Brocken Railway. They are all named after the German poet, Johann Wolfgang von Goethe.

== Harz ==
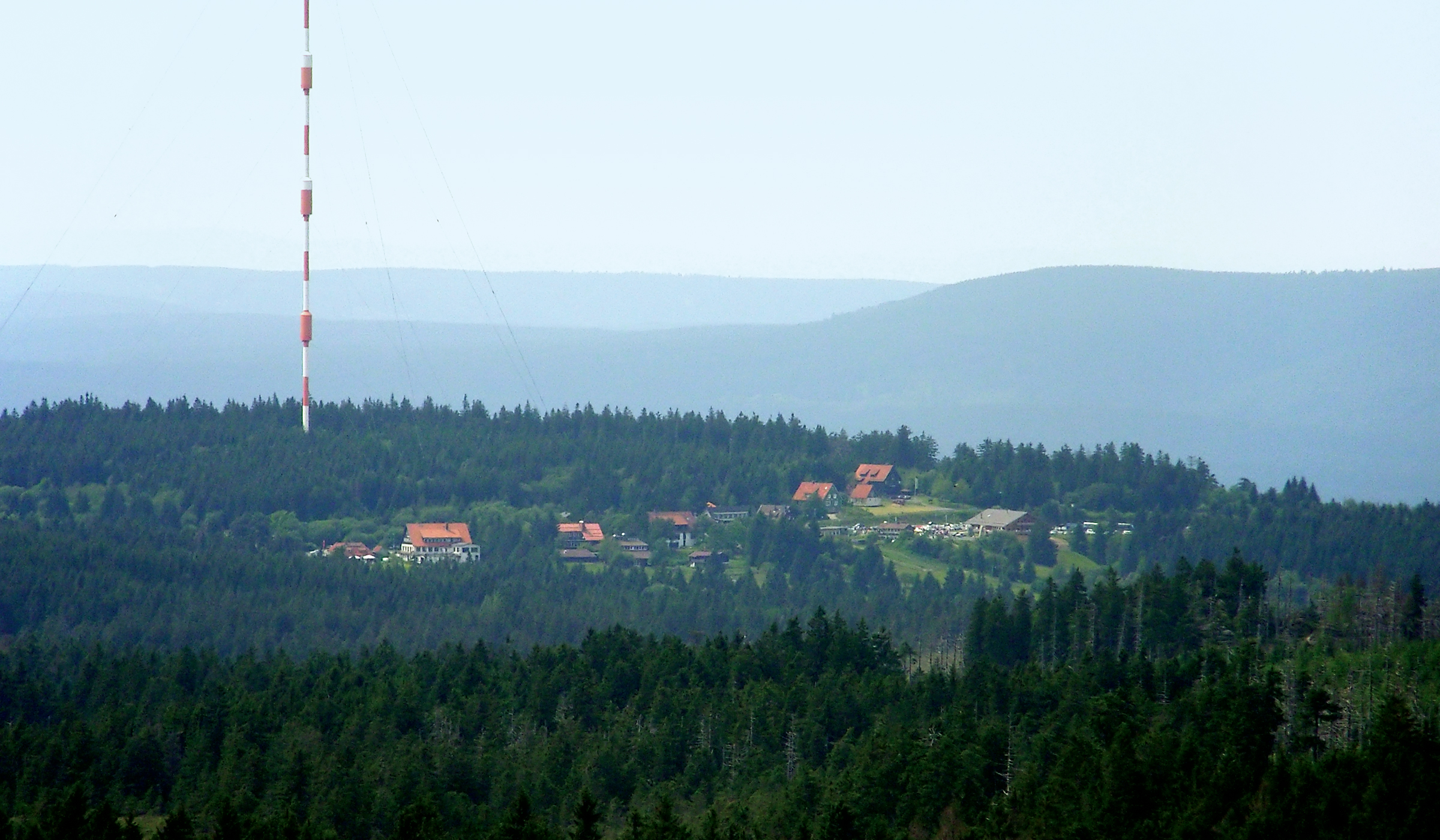
View from Goethe Way of Torfhaus

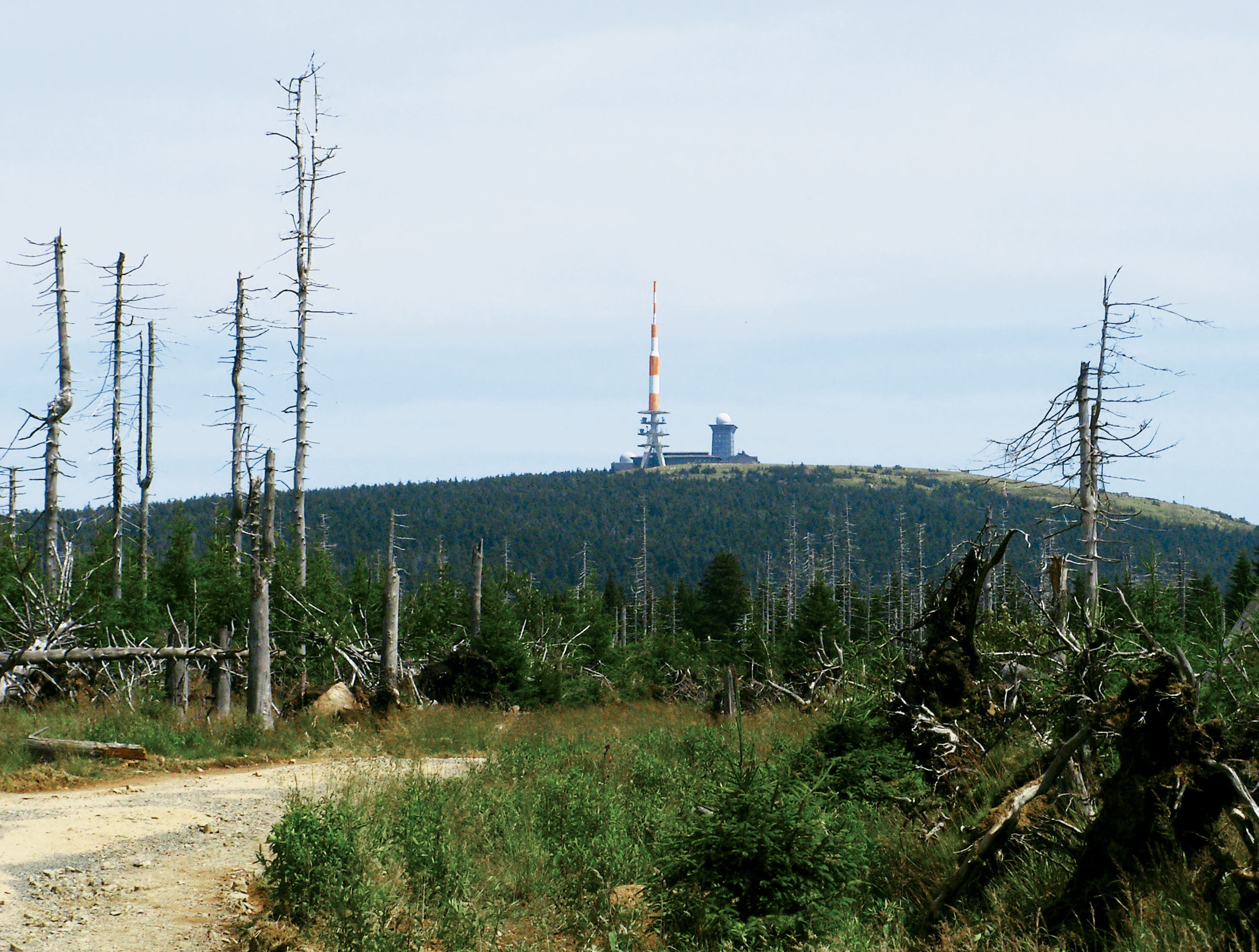
View from Goethe Way of the Brocken

Torfhaus–Brocken

- Length: ca. 8 km
- Lowest point: 800 m (Torfhaus)
- Highest point: 1,141.1 m (Brocken)

The Goethe Way is one of the most frequented hiking trails in the Harz National Park. Around 200,000 people walk along this path every year to the highest mountain in the Harz, the Brocken. It follows the route probably taken by Goethe in climbing from Torfhaus to the Brocken on 10 December 1777. Goethe's exact route is however not known today.

Up early to Torfhause in deep snow. Quarter past ten decamped; from there up the Brocken. Snow one ell deep, but reached top quarter past one. Wonderful, bright moment, the whole world in clouds and mist and up above all was bright. What is man that you are mindful of him. Back again around four. At the foresters' hostel in Torfhause.

— Schriften zur Geologie und Mineralogie – Goethe

Starting from Torfhaus, the Goethe Way runs along the Abbegraben stream past the Great Torfhaus Moor (Großer Torfhausmoor) heading southeast, to below the Quitschenberg mountain - and the crags of Luisenklippen before reaching the Kaiser Way (Kaiserweg). After a few hundred metres where it shares the path with the latter route, the Goethe Way branches off to the east. Following a northeastern curve over the Quitschenberg it circles the Brockenfeld Moor, the source of the rivers Abbe and Cold Bode. Shortly after the Eckersprung it crosses the border into Saxony-Anhalt. At the depot station the Goethe Way meets the Brocken Railway. Until the closure of the former border region by East Germany in 1961, the Goethe Way next ran on a straight line to the northeast over the Königsberg, past the Hirschhornklippen crags, and up to the summit of the Brocken. Today, the path runs along the "New Goethe Way" (Neuer Goetheweg) opened in 1991 running in an arc along the railway line up to the Brocken Road. Here, it crosses the natural tree line and reaches the Brocken plateau shortly after crossing the road.

From July 2008 to October 2009 the New Goethe Way, parts of which had previously formed a board walk, was upgraded into a three-metre-wide (9.8 ft) path. This measure which was discussed is detail beforehand allows the path to be cleared of snow by machines as was already possible on the other section of the Goethe Way. This makes the ascent safe even in winter.

The Goethe Way is part of the Harz Witches' Trail.

== Thuringia ==
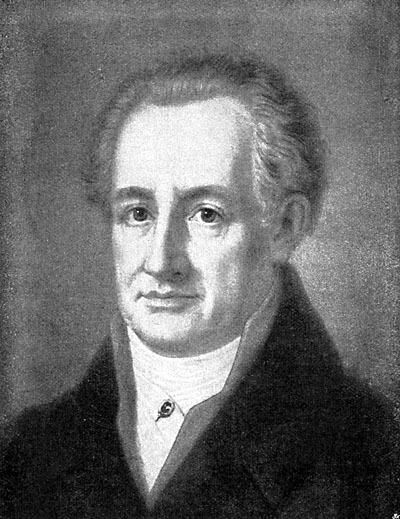
Johann Wolfgang von Goethe

Weimar–Saalborn–Hochdorf bei Weimar–Neckeroda–Großkochberg

- Length: ca. 28 km
- Lowest point: 230 m (Weimar)
- Highest point: 525 m (Luisa Tower)

The Thuringian Goethe Way begins in the centre of Weimar, and runs past Blankenhain as a light footpath to Großkochberg. The route is marked with a white G on a green background. After only a few hundred metres the Goethe Way reaches the Belvedere Castle, which is also often used as an entry point for Goethe Way walks. In Buchfart the Goethe Way crosses a wooden through-truss bridge (Holzkastenbrücke) and runs past limestone rocks in which artificial caves were once hollowed out as a refuge. The Luisa Tower (Luisenturm) near Großkochberg offers a fine view of the Weimar Land just before the end of the walk.

== See also ==
- Literary tourism
