= List of rock formations in the Harz =

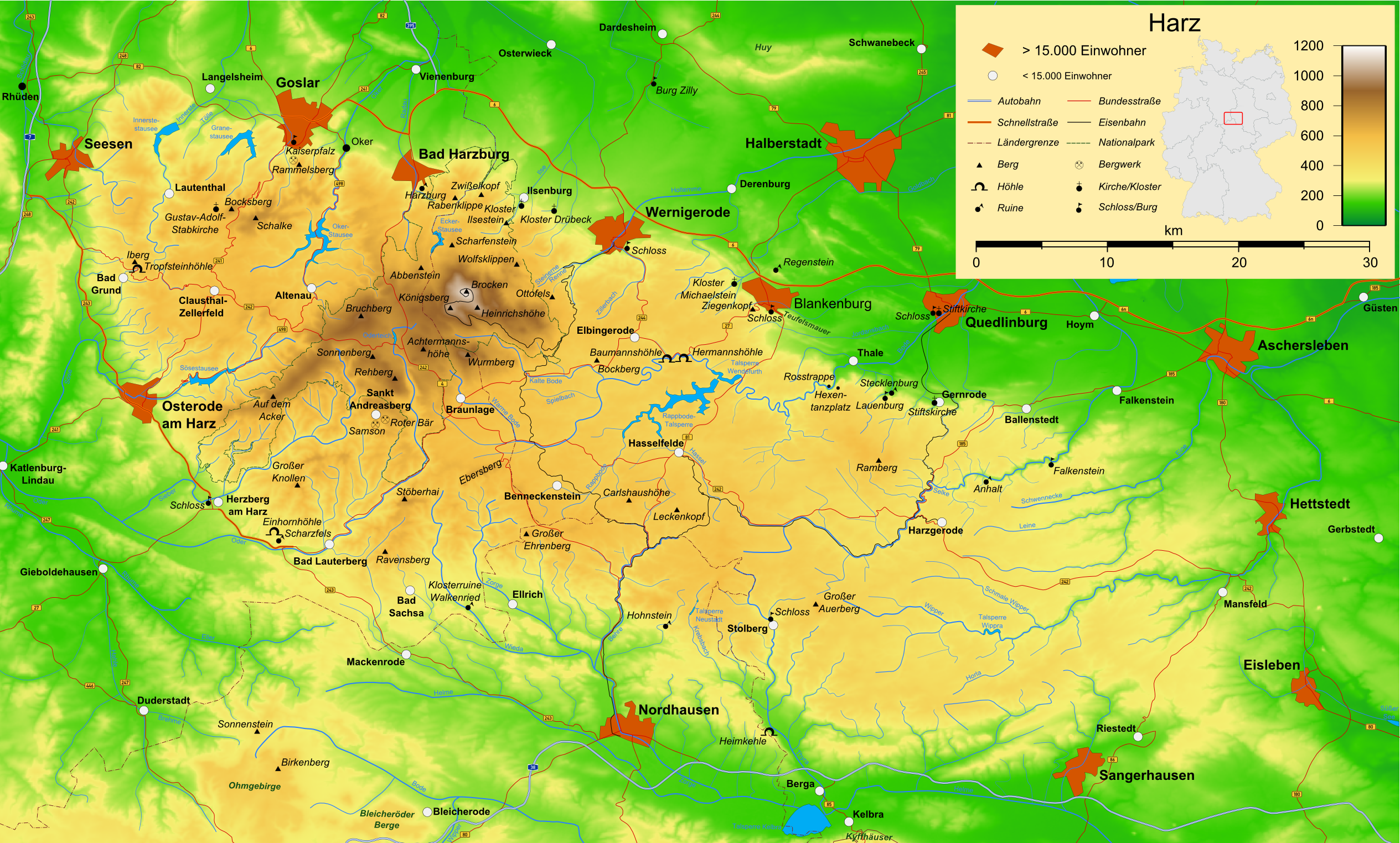
Topography of the Harz

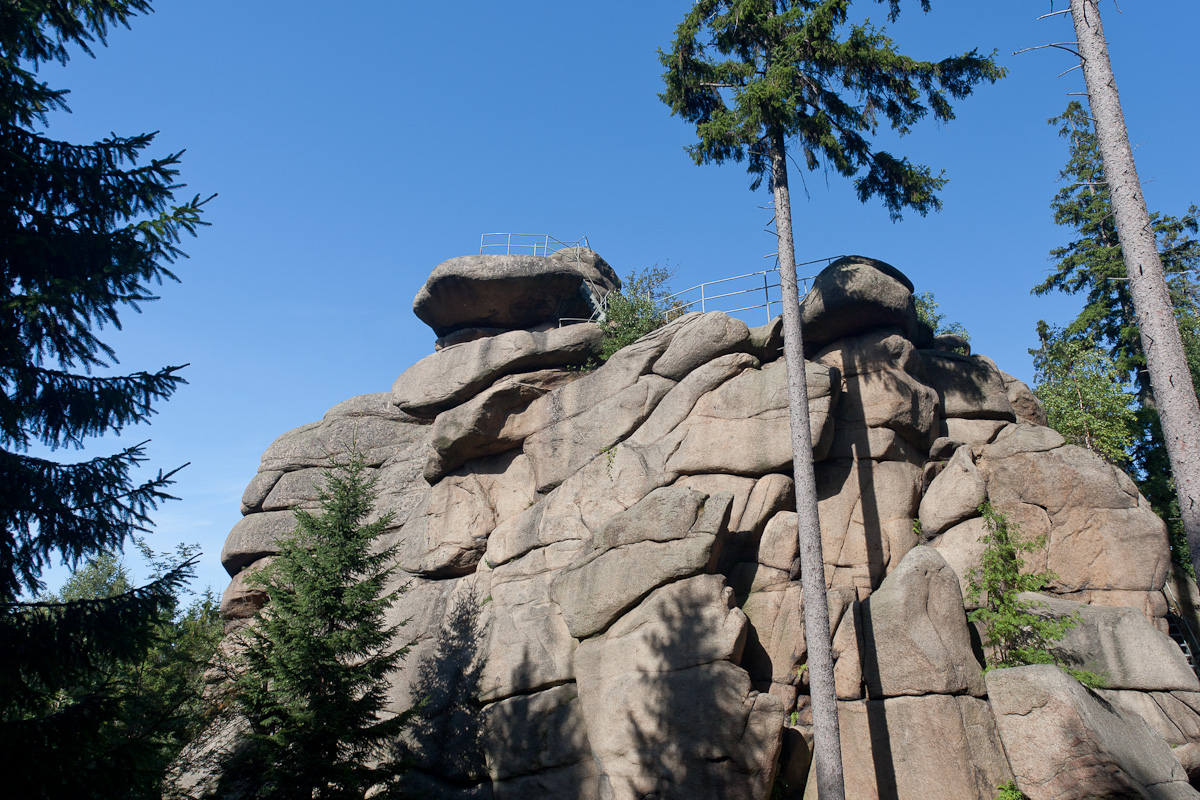
The Ottofels, near the Hohnekamm

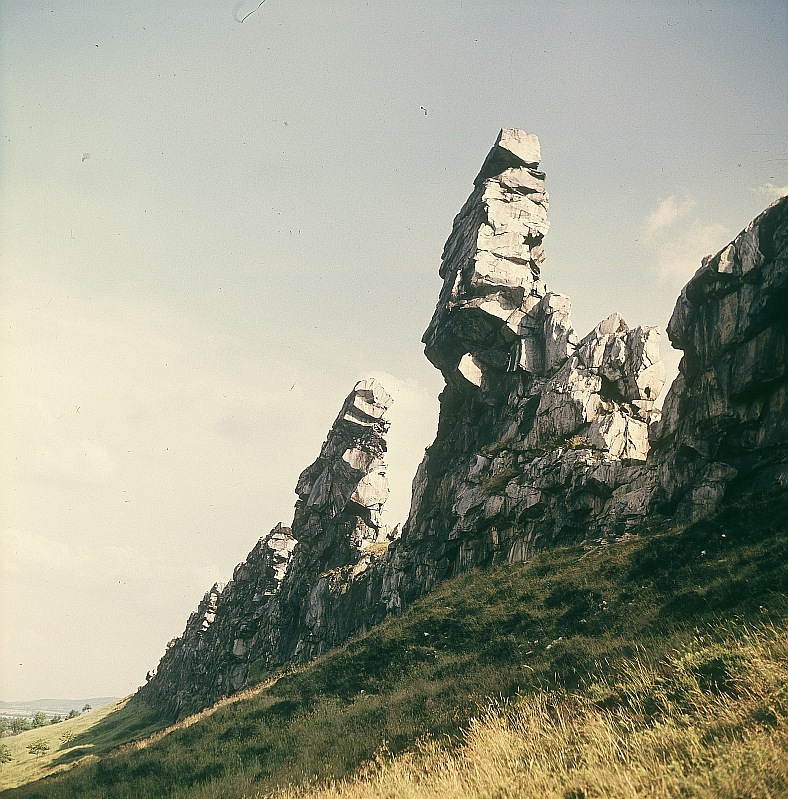
The Mittelsteine, part of the Teufelsmauer

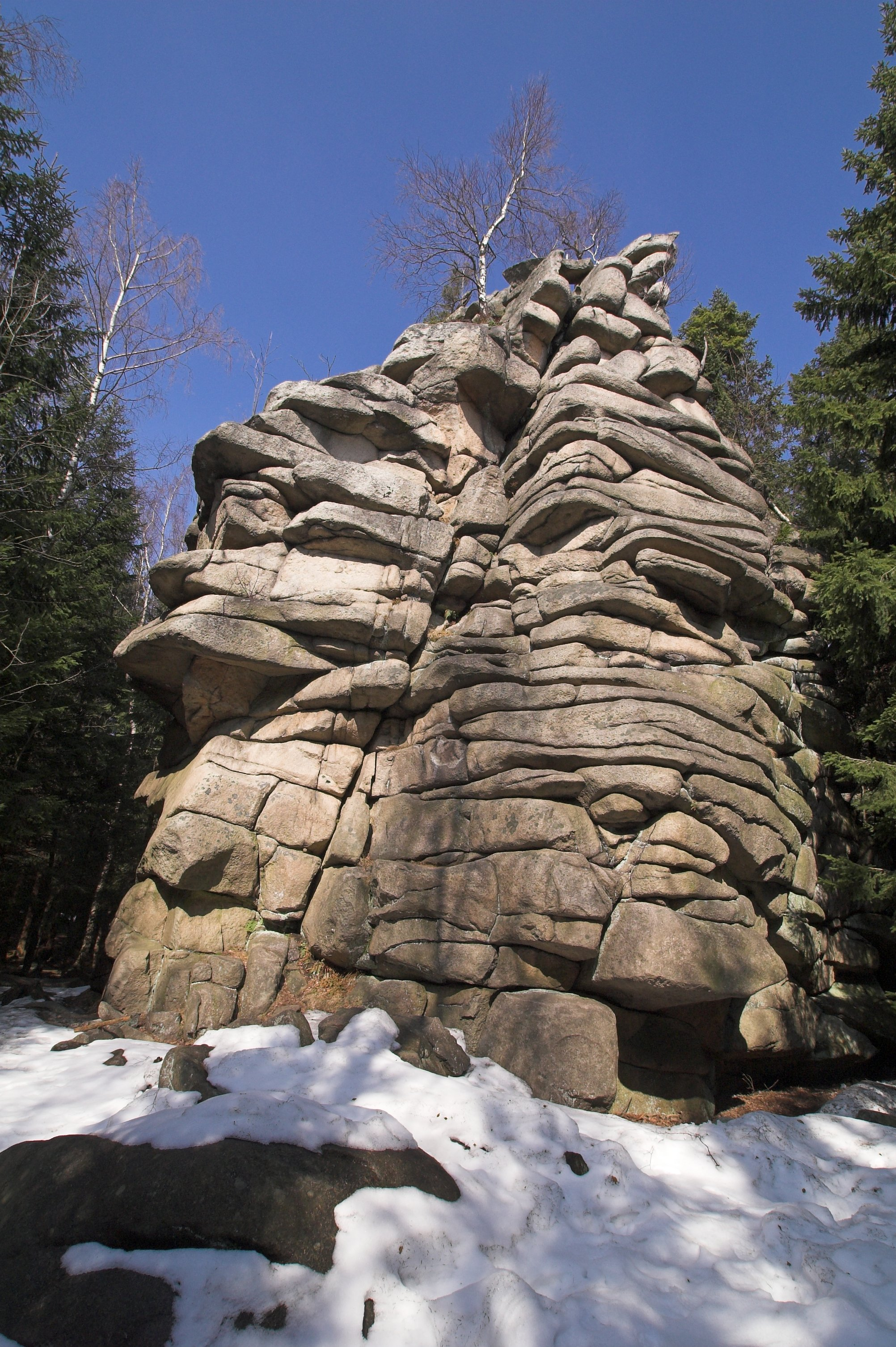
Southwestern Schnarcherklippen, on the Barenberg

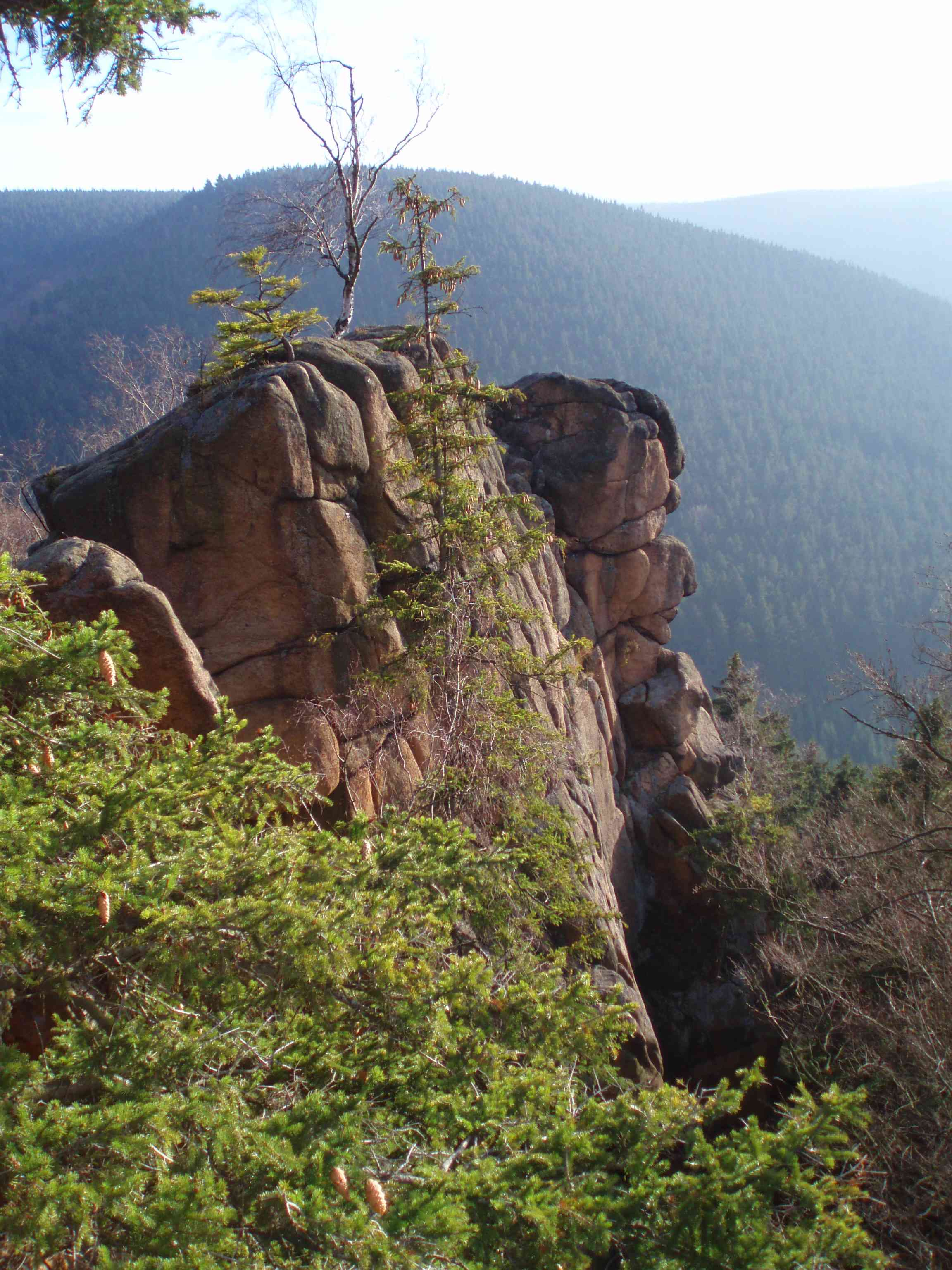
The Rabenklippe, by the Kaltetalskopf

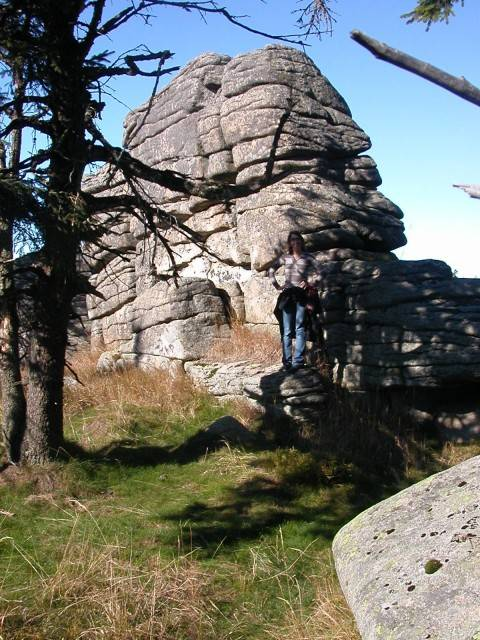
The Hirschhornklippen, on the Königsberg

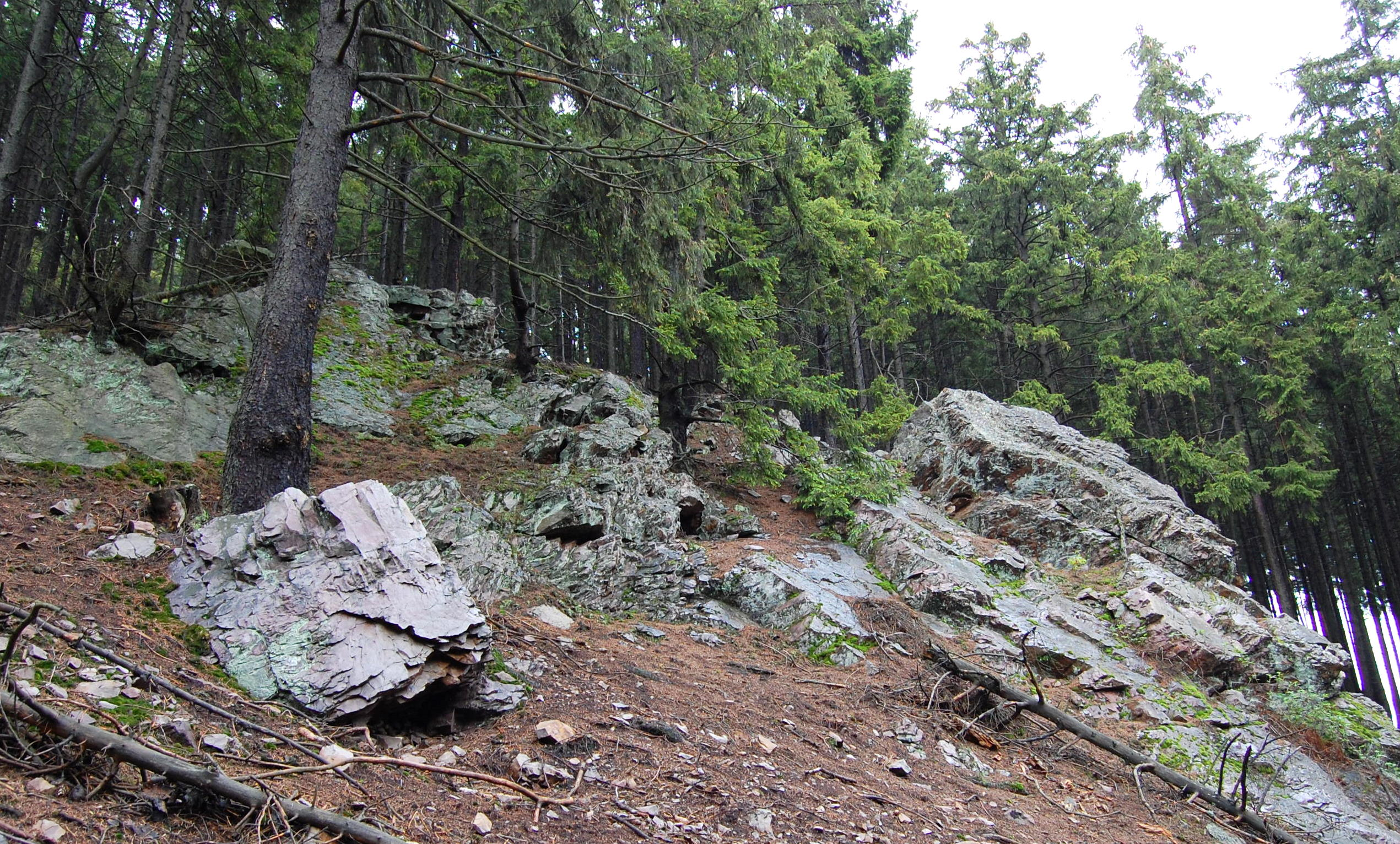
The Harschenhöllenklippe, by the Halberstädter Berg

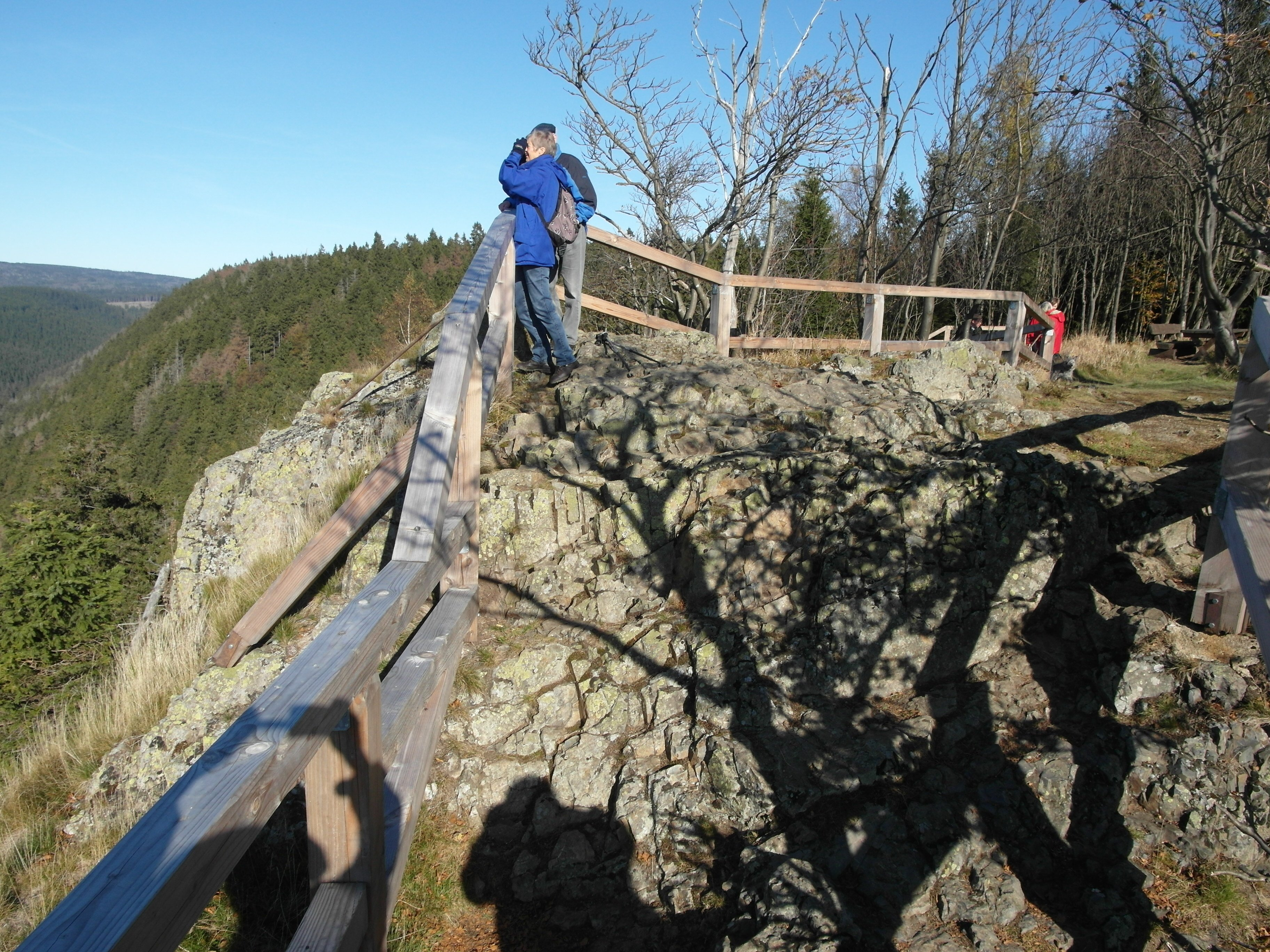
The Hahnenkleeklippen, near Königskrug, above the Oder Valley

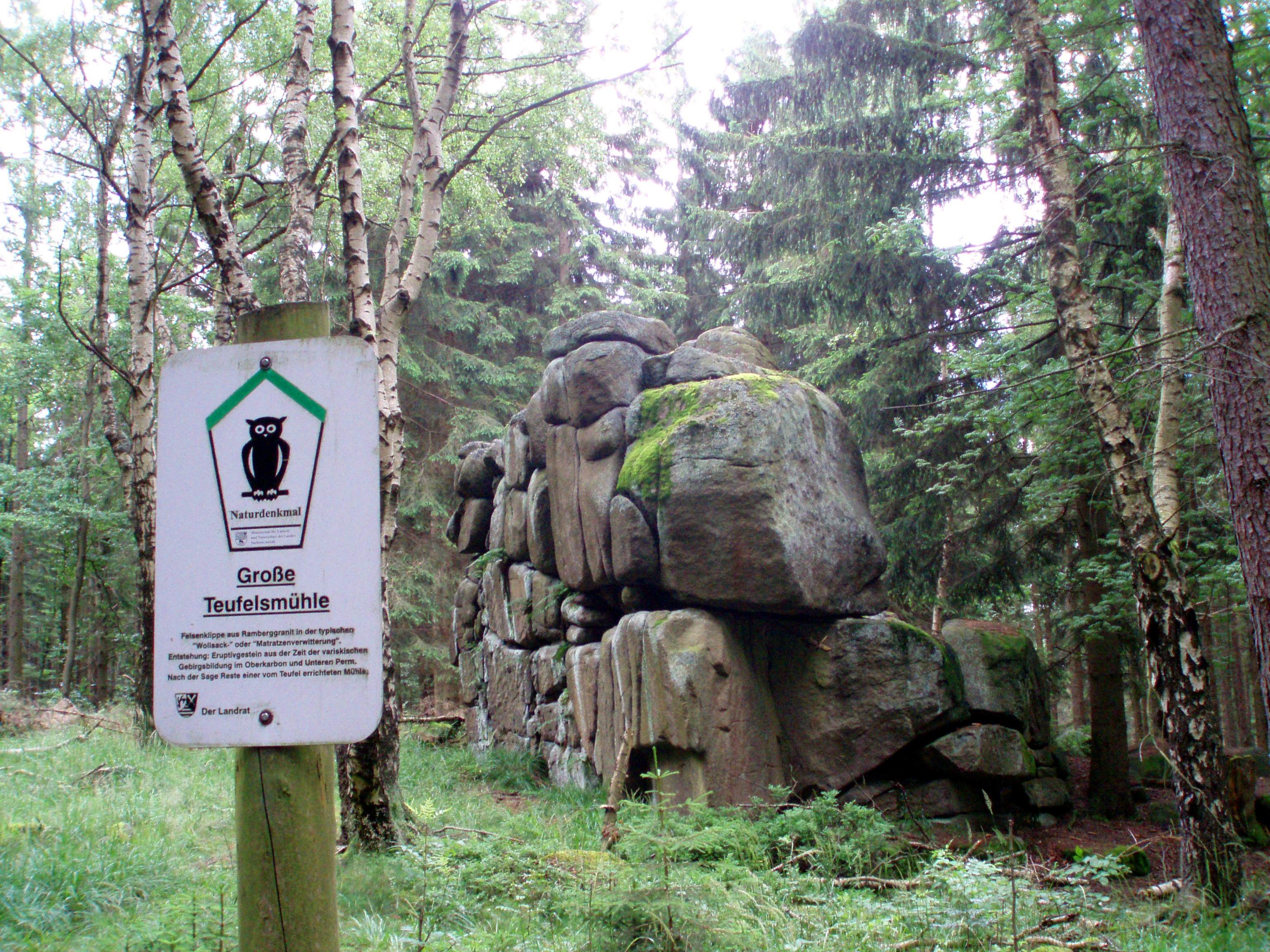
The Große Teufelsmühle, on the Viktorshöhe

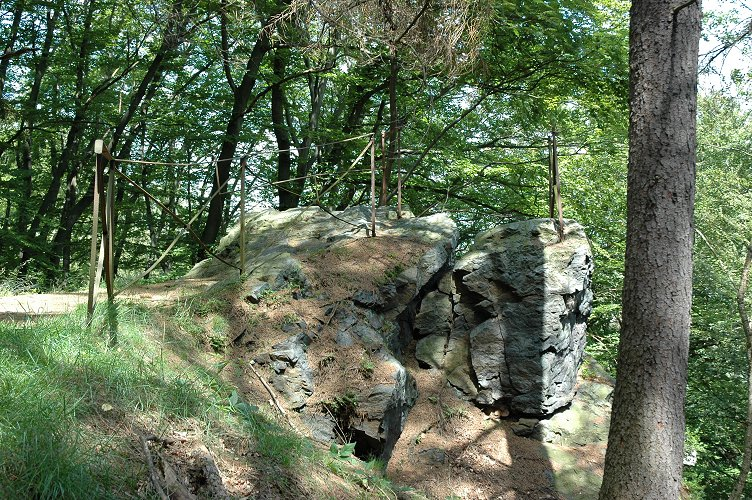
The Bäumlersklippe, on the Meineberg

This is a list of rock formations in the Harz. They are known as the Harzklippen (literally "Harz crags" or "Harz cliffs") in German, which is the collective name for the, mainly, granite rock outcrops, crags and tors in the Harz mountains of Germany. Most of them have the status of a natural monument.

The following list contains an alphabetically-sorted selection of rock formations in the Harz with - where known - their height in metres (m) above sea level, referenced to Normalnull (NN):

- Achtermannstor (max. c. 900 m), on the Achtermannshöhe, near Braunlage, Lower Saxony
- Ackertklippe, near Königshütte, Saxony-Anhalt
- Adlerklippen (max. c. 340 m), in the valley of the Oker, near Goslar-Oker, Lower Saxony
- Adlersklippen (see below: Teufelsmauer)
- Ahrentsklint (Ahrentsklintklippe; max. 822.4 m), on the Erdbeerkopf, near Schierke, Saxony-Anhalt
- Altarklippen (max. c. 490 m), on the Heimberg, near Lautenthal, Lower Saxony
- Anhaltinischer Saalstein (max. c. 393 m), in the valley of the Kältetalbach, near Bad Suderode, Saxony-Anhalt
- Bärenklippe (near c. 870 m), part of the Hohneklippen of the Hohnekamm, between Wernigerode and Schierke, Saxony-Anhalt
- Bäumlersklippe (near c. 350 m), on the Meineberg, near Ilsenburg, Saxony-Anhalt
- Bielsteinsklippe (near c. 385 m), on the Bielstein, near Hüttenrode, Saxony-Anhalt
- Böser Kleef, near Altenbrak, Saxony-Anhalt
- Bremer Klippe (near c. 550 m), on the Jagdkopf, near Wieda, Lower Saxony
- Breitesteinklippen (near. c. 840 m), on the Achtermannshöhe, near Torfhaus, Lower Saxony
- Brockenkinderklippe (near c. 905 m), on the Renneckenberg, between Wernigerode and Schierke, Saxony-Anhalt
- Brockentor (max. 1,039.5 m), on the Heinrichshöhe, between Wernigerode and Schierke, Saxony-Anhalt
- Dreibrodesteine (near c. 641 m), near Sankt Andreasberg, Lower Saxony
- Dühringsklippe, on the Netzberg, near Netzkater, Thuringia
- Elfenstein (max. c. 420 m), on the Elfenstein, near Bad Harzburg, Lower Saxony
- Elversstein (max. c. 499 m), on the Steinberg, near Hasserode, Saxony-Anhalt
- Ettersklippe (near c. 440 m), on the Ettersberg, near Bad Harzburg, Lower Saxony
- Falkenklippe (max. 405.2 m), in the Bodetal, between Altenbrak and Treseburg, Saxony-Anhalt
- Feigenbaumklippe (auch: Feigenbaumkanzel; near c. 540 m), on the Huthberg, between Oker and Schulenberg, Lower Saxony
- Ferdinandsstein (near c. 639 m), near Ilsenburg, Saxony-Anhalt
- Feuersteinklippe (near c. 710 m), near Schierke station, Saxony-Anhalt
- Geroldsklippen (max. c. 390 m), in the valley of the Wurmbach, near Stecklenberg, Saxony-Anhalt
- Gewitterklippen (max. c. 410 m), in the Bodetal, between Thale and Treseburg, Saxony-Anhalt
- Gipfelklippe (max. 1,033.5 m), on the Königsberg, between Ilsenburg and Schierke, Saxony-Anhalt
- Glückaufklippen (max. c. 670 m), on the Kuppe, near Sankt Andreasberg, Lower Saxony
- Goldenkerklippe (max. c. 840 m), Auf dem Acker, Lower Saxony
- Grenzklippe (near c. 886 m), part of the Hohneklippen of the Hohnekamm, between Wernigerode and Schierke, Saxony-Anhalt
- Große Teufelsmühle (max. c. 581 m), on the Viktorshöhe, near Friedrichsbrunn, Saxony-Anhalt
- Große Wurmbergklippe (auch: Große Klippe; max. 823.8 m) (see below: Wurmbergklippen)
- Große Zeterklippe (Obere Zeterklippe; max. 929.7 m), see below: Zeterklippen
- Hahnenkleeklippen (max. c. 750 m), east of the Odertals, near Braunlage, Lower Saxony
- Hohnekammsteinklippen (max. c. 780 m), Auf dem Acker, Lower Saxony
- Hanskühnenburgfelsen (near c. 815 m), on the Hanskühnenburg, Auf dem Acker, Lower Saxony
- Hanskühnenburgklippe (near c. 818 m), near the Hanskühnenburg, Auf dem Acker, Lower Saxony
- Harschenhöllenklippe (near / max. 411 m, on the Halberstädter Berg, near Oehrenfeld, Saxony-Anhalt
- Hausmannsklippen (max. c. 480 m), on the Kaltetalskopf, near Bad Harzburg, Lower Saxony
- Hexenküche (near c. 570 m), on the Huthberg, between Oker and Schulenberg, Lower Saxony
- Hirschhornklippen (near 1,023.2 m), on the Königsberg, between Wernigerode and Schierke, Saxony-Anhalt
- Hohe Klippen (max. c. 770 m), west of the Odertals, near Sankt Andreasberg, Lower Saxony
- Hoher Kleef (max. c. 306 m), near Rübeland, Saxony-Anhalt
- Hopfensäcke (max. c. 875 m), on the Quitschenberg, near Torfhaus, Lower Saxony
- Ifenkopfer Klippe (max. c. 620 m), on the Ifenkopf, between Altenau and Kon theschlacken, Lower Saxony
- Ilsestein (max. 473.2 m), near Ilsenburg, Saxony-Anhalt
- Jungfernklippe (max. c. 390 m), on the Kleiner Staufenberg, near Zorge, Lower Saxony
- Kästeklippen (max. c. 602 m), on the Huthberg, between Oker and Schulenberg, Lower Saxony
- Kahle Klippe (max. 1,011.5 m), on the Westhang of the Brockens, Saxony-Anhalt
- Kanapeeklippe (max. c. 750 m), Auf dem Acker, Lower Saxony
- Kanzelklippe (max. c. 950 m), on the Königsberg, between Wernigerode and Schierke, Saxony-Anhalt
- Kapellenklippe (near c. 910 m), on the Renneckenberg (on the Pferdekopf), between Wernigerode and Schierke, Saxony-Anhalt
- Kattnäse (near c. 580 m), on the Mittelberg, near Bad Harzburg, Lower Saxony
- Kesselklippe (max. c. 975 m), on the Königsberg, between Wernigerode and Schierke, Saxony-Anhalt
- Kleine Teufelsmühle (near c. 577 m), on the Viktorshöhe, near Friedrichsbrunn, Saxony-Anhalt
- Kleine Wurmbergklippe (auch: Kleine Klippe; near c. 690 m) (see below: Wurmbergklippen)
- Kleine Zeterklippe (Untere Zeterklippe; max. c. 827 m), see below: Zeterklippen
- Leistenklippe (near c. 880 m), part of the Hohneklippen of the Hohnekamm, between Wernigerode and Schierke, Saxony-Anhalt
- Luisenklippe (see below: Quitschenbergklippen)
- Margaretenklippen (max. c. 400 m), on the Glockenberg, near Goslar, Lower Saxony
- Mäuseklippe (near c. 660 m), on the Barenberg, near Elend and Schierke, Saxony-Anhalt
- Mausefalle (near c. 550 m), on the Huthberg, between Oker and Schulenberg, Lower Saxony
- Mittlere Zeterklippe (max. c. 866 m), see below: Zeterklippen
- Mönchskappenklippe (max. c. 680 m), Auf dem Acker, Lower Saxony
- Muxklippe (max. c. 550 m), on the Hasselkopf, near Bad Harzburg, Lower Saxony
- Ohrenklippen (max. c. 710 m), on the Hohe Wand, near Wernigerode-Hasserode, Saxony-Anhalt
- Ottofels (max. c. 620 m), between Wernigerode and the Hohnekamm, Saxony-Anhalt
- Paternosterklippe (max. c. 522 m), near the Plessenburg, near Ilsenburg, Saxony-Anhalt
- Pferdediebsklippe (near c. 550 m), on the Hasselkopf, near Bad Harzburg, Lower Saxony
- Präzeptorklippe, in the Rappbode Reservoir, not far from Hasselfelde, Saxony-Anhalt
- Preußischer Saalstein (max. c. 405 m), in the valley of the Kältetalbach, near Bad Suderode, Saxony-Anhalt
- Quitschenbergklippen (max. c. 860 m; including the Luisenklippe), on the Quitschenberg, near Torfhaus, Lower Saxony
- Rabenklippe (max. c. 550 m), on the Kaltetalskopf, near Bad Harzburg, Lower Saxony
- Rabenklippe (max. c. 975 m), on the Königsberg, between Wernigerode and Schierke, Saxony-Anhalt
- Rabenklippen (Große and Kleine Rabenklippe), on the Rappbode Reservoir near Hasselfelde, Saxony-Anhalt
- Ravensklippen (max. c. 490 m), on the Dietrichsberg, near Schulenberg, Saxony-Anhalt
- Roßtrappe (max. 403.0 m), near Thale on the Roßtrappenberg (Bodetal), Saxony-Anhalt
- Rudolfklippe (max. c. 570 m), on the Winterberg, near Bad Harzburg, Lower Saxony
- Sachsenstein (near c. 500 m), on the Sachsenberg, near Bad Harzburg, Lower Saxony
- Sachsensteinsklippen (max. c. 320 m), on the Sachsenstein, between Bad Sachsa and Neuhof, Lower Saxony
- Scharfensteinklippe (max. 697.6 m), on the Scharfenstein (Ilsenburg), near Ilsenburg, Saxony-Anhalt
- Scharfensteinklippe (max. 462.4 m), on the Scharfenstein (Wernigerode), near Wernigerode, Saxony-Anhalt
- Scherstorklippen (max. c. 694 m), on the Barenberg, near Elend and Schierke, Saxony-Anhalt
- Schluftkopfklippe (near c. 805 m), on the Königsberg, between Wernigerode and Schierke, Saxony-Anhalt
- Schnarcherklippen (max. c. 671 m), on the Barenberg, near Elend and Schierke, Saxony-Anhalt
- Seilerklippe (near c. 760 m), Auf dem Acker, Lower Saxony
- Sergeantenklippe (max. c. 680 m), on the Großen Breitenberg, near Riefensbeek, Lower Saxony
- Siebenwochenklippe (max. c. 520 m), on the Ifenkopf, between Altenau and Kon theschlacken, Lower Saxony
- Sösestein (max. c. 730 m), Auf dem Acker, Lower Saxony
- Sommerklippen (max. c. 410 m), in the valley of the Wurmbach, near Stecklenberg, Saxony-Anhalt
- Sophienklippe (max. c. 650 m), Auf dem Acker, Lower Saxony
- Spießerklippe (max. c. 640 m), Auf dem Acker, Lower Saxony
- Stangenklippe (near c. 820 m), on the Königsberg, between Wernigerode and Schierke, Saxony-Anhalt
- Steile Wand (max. c. 780 m), on the Bruchberg, in Richtung Torfhaus, Lower Saxony
- Stollenklippe (max. c. 690 m), Auf dem Acker, Lower Saxony
- Taubenklippe (max. 560.3 m), in the valley of the Ecker, near Ilsenburg, on the Frankenberg, Saxony-Anhalt
- Teufelsmauer (part of the Adlersklippen; max. 331.5 m), on the Heidelberg between Blankenburg and Ballenstedt, Saxony-Anhalt
- Teufelsmühle (siehe oben: Große Teufelsmühle and Kleine Teufelsmühle)
- Tofana (Harz), part of the Adlerklippen near Goslar-Oker in the Okertal, Lower Saxony
- Treppenstein (max. c. 511 m), in the Okertal, on the Huthberg, between Oker and Schulenberg, Lower Saxony
- Trudenstein (near c. 735 m), near Schierke, on the Hohnekopf of the Hohnekamm, Saxony-Anhalt
- Uhlenstein (max 469.1 m), in the valley of the Uhlenbach, Friedrichsbrunn, Saxony-Anhalt
- Uhuklippen (max. c. 390 m), near Goslar-Oker in the Okertal, Lower Saxony
- Viktorsklippen, in the valley of the Kältetalbach, near Bad Suderode, Saxony-Anhalt
- Winterklippen (max. c. 420 m), in the valley of the Wurmbach, near Stecklenberg, Saxony-Anhalt
- Woldsbergklippen (near c. 560 m), on the Woldsberg, near Bad Harzburg, Lower Saxony
- Wolfsklippen (max. c. 640 m), on the Wolfskopf, near Kon theschlacken, Lower Saxony
- Wolfsklippen (c. 710 m), between Drei Annen Hohne and the Plessenburg, Saxony-Anhalt
- Wurmbergklippen (Große and Kleine Wurmbergklippe), on the Wurmberg, near Braunlage, Saxony-Anhalt
- Zeterklippen (max. 929.7 m), on the Renneckenberg, between Wernigerode and Schierke, Saxony-Anhalt

== See also ==
- List of mountains of the Harz
- Gegensteine, a pair of rock outcrops on the Teufelsmauer in the North Harz Foreland
- Hamburger Wappen, a pair rock outcrop on the Teufelsmauer in the North Harz Foreland
