= Hoher Kleef =

Rock formation in Rübeland, Germany

Coordinates: 51°45′13.7″N 10°50′45.8″E

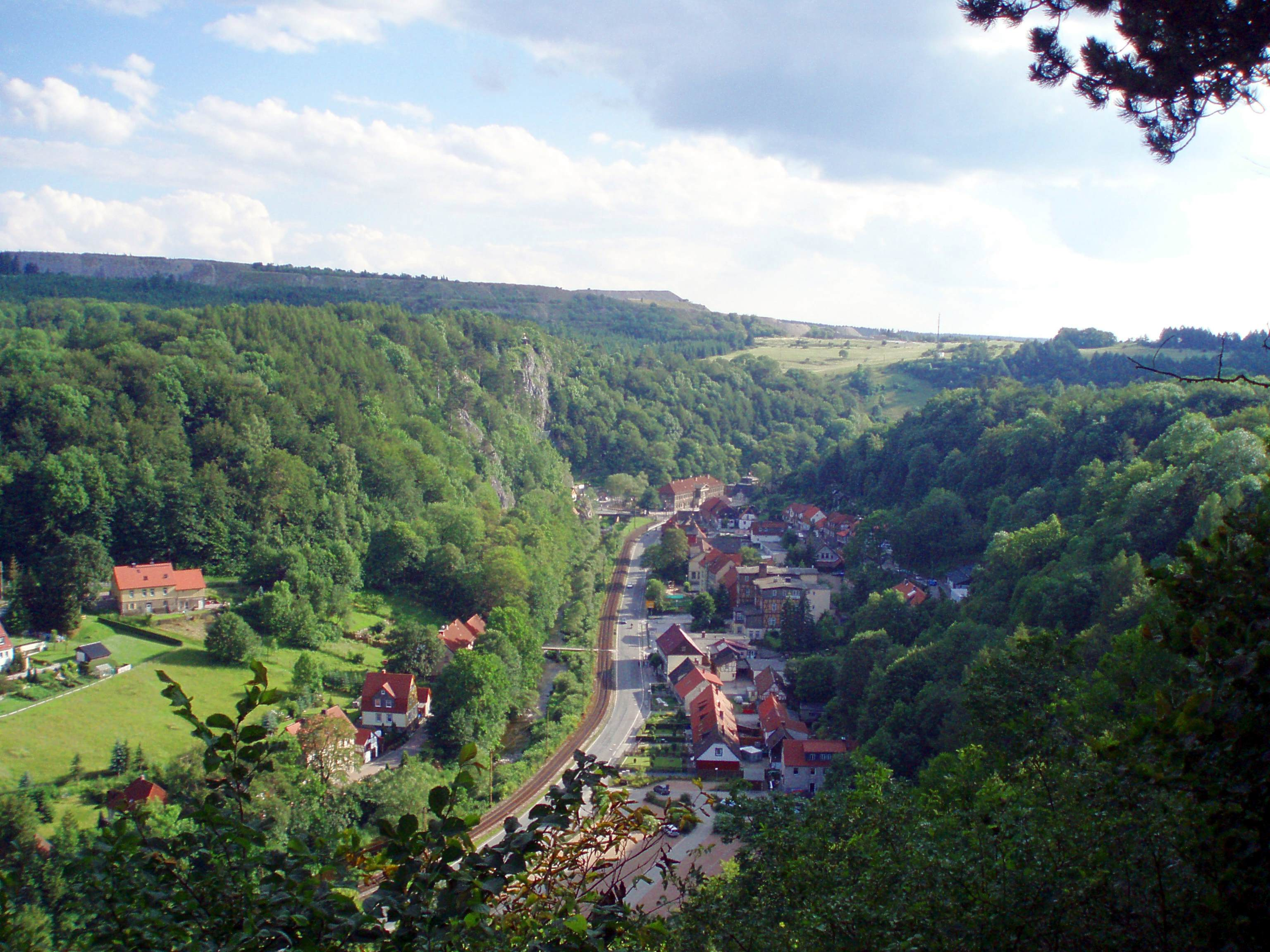
View of Rübeland and the Hoher Kleef from the Schornsteinberg

The Hoher Kleef (306 m above sea level (NN)) is a rock formation in Rübeland in the district of Harz within the Harz mountains of Germany. It is mainly composed of granite.

The Hoher Kleef can be reached via a footpath. It lies only a few metres away from the Harzer Hexenstieg ("Harz Witches' Path"). An observation pavilion was erected here at the start of the 20th century, from which there is an expansive view of the village, the River Bode and the surrounding Harz mountains as far as the Wurmberg and the Brocken.

There is a checkpoint, No. 88, for the Harzer Wandernadel hiking network at the Hoher Kleef viewing point.

== See also ==
- List of rock formations in the Harz
