= Taubenklippe =

Rock Formation in German

Coordinates: 51°51′44″N 10°37′06″E

The Taubenklippe is a rock formation in the Harz mountains in the German state of Saxony-Anhalt. It lies about halfway between Bad Harzburg and Ilsenburg at a height of 572 m above NN on the eastern slopes of the Ecker valley. From the crag there is a good view over Harz Foreland, the heights near Bad Harzburg and the highest mountain in the Har, the Brocken. The Taubenklippe may be reached from the Ecker valley on a footpath, some 6 km long, that starts in Ilsenburg.

The Taubenklippe is checkpoint number 4 in the Harzer Wandernadel hiking trail network.

== See also ==
- List of rock formations in the Harz
