= Kahle Klippe =

Coordinates: 51°48′13″N 10°35′56″E

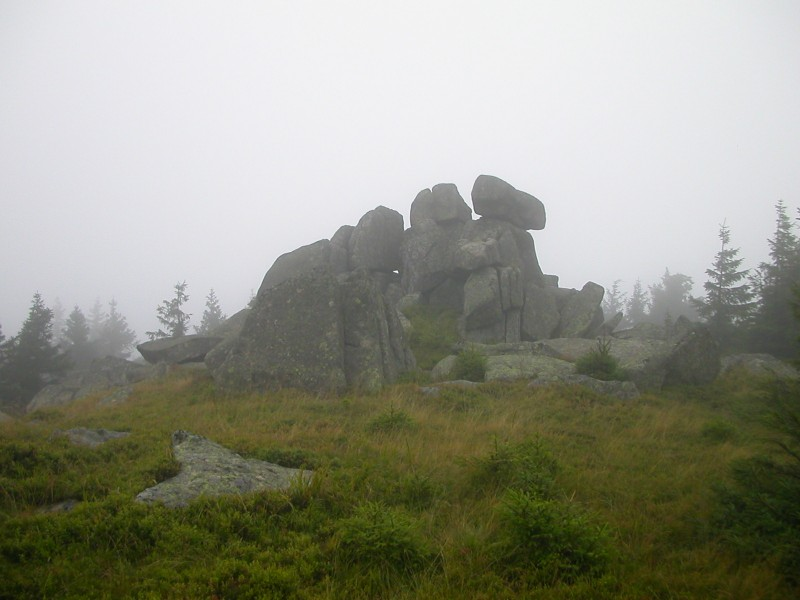
Kahle Klippe

The Kahle Klippe is a rock formation in the High Harz in central Germany on the eastern slope of the Brocken above the valley of the Ecker.

It lies about halfway between the level crossing over the Hirtenweg path and the Ecker at a height of 1,011 metres above sea level. The rocks cannot be seen from the summit of the Brocken, the highest mountain in the Harz and the best view of them is from the village of Torfhaus. Because the rocks lie in the core zone of the Harz National Park, they may only be visited with the permission of the National Park management. It is one of the most difficult crags to reach in the High Harz. An old forest path runs past the rocks, passing within 100 metres. Below the Kahle Klippe lies the still inaccessible Brandklippe crag.

== See also ==
- List of rock formations in the Harz
