= Ottofelsen =

Coordinates: 51°47′49″N 10°42′43″E

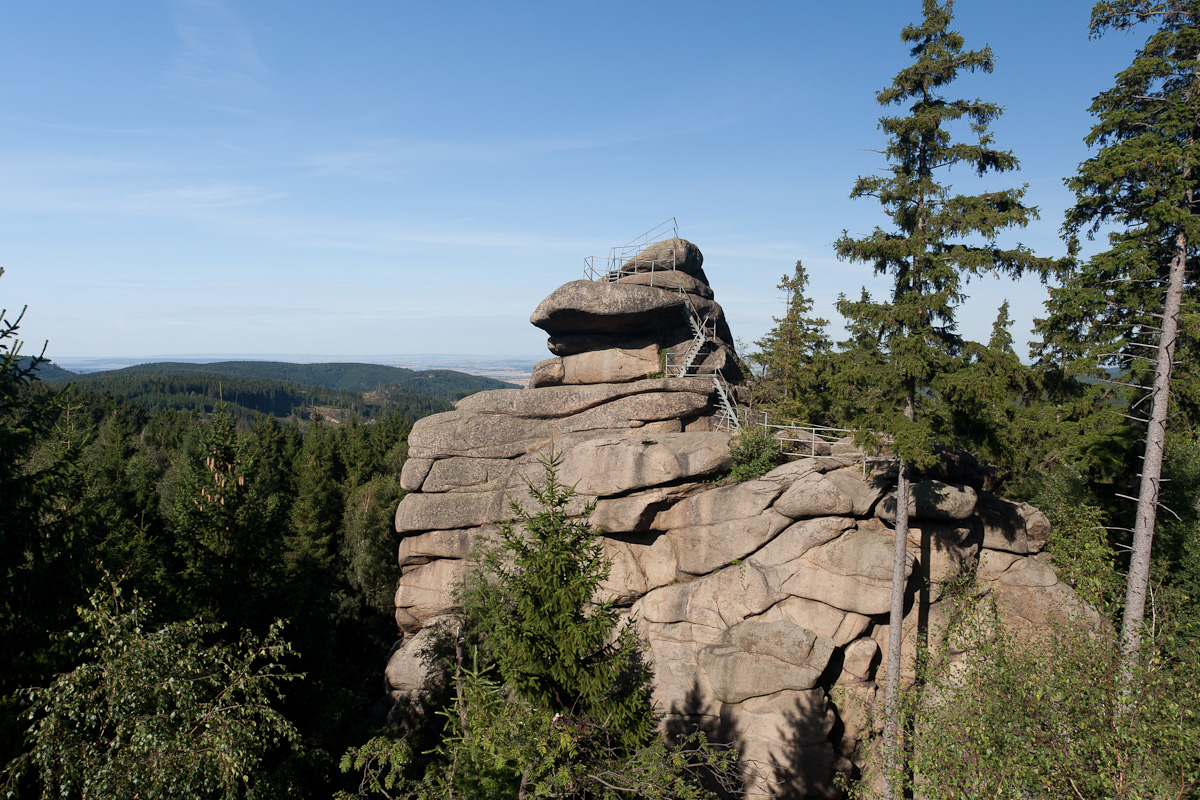
The Ottofels

The Ottofels ("Otto Rock"), named after Prince Otto of Stolberg-Wernigerode, is a tor and natural monument near Wernigerode in the Harz mountains of central Germany.

The Ottofels or Ottofelsen lie about 2.5 km southwest of Hasserode in the borough of Wernigerode. It can only be reached on foot, either from the Steinerne Renne halt on the Harz Railway and Brocken Railway or from the car park at the junction of the Thumkuhle and Dränge valleys not far from the road to Drei Annen Hohne.

The rocks stand at a height of 584 metres above sea level and are 36 metres high. They are made of coarse-grained granite and have been weathered to form a tor. On 27 July 1892 there was a ceremony to mark the completion of public access to the top, which consisted of several iron ladders. These ladders were replaced after the Wende in 1990. In addition the Ottofels is used for rock climbing by mountaineers.

From the summit there is a panoramic view of the mountains and valleys of the Harz as far as its highest peak, the Brocken, and far over the northern Harz Foreland.

The Ottofels is checkpoint no. 27 in the Harzer Wandernadel hiking network.

== Photographs ==
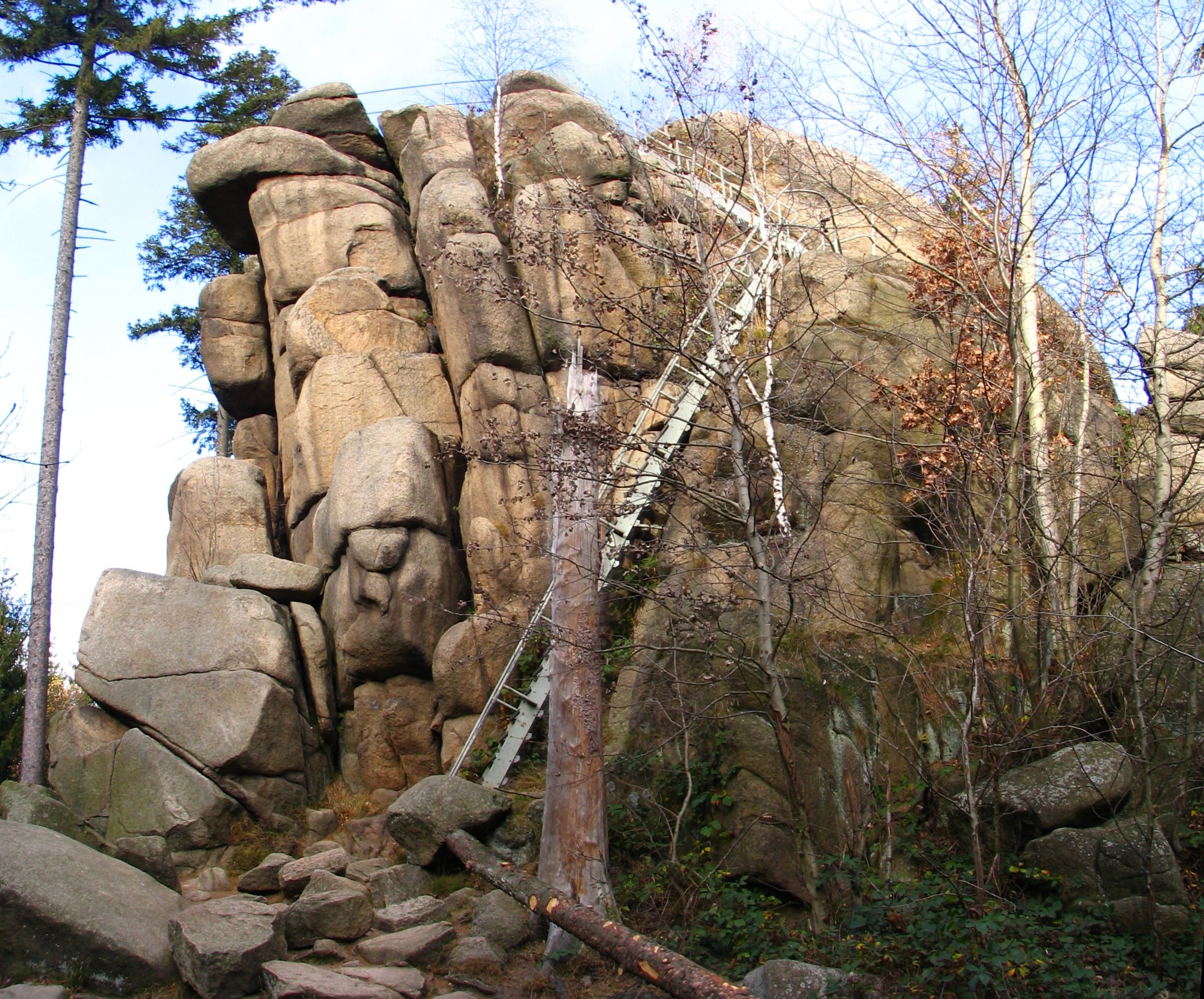

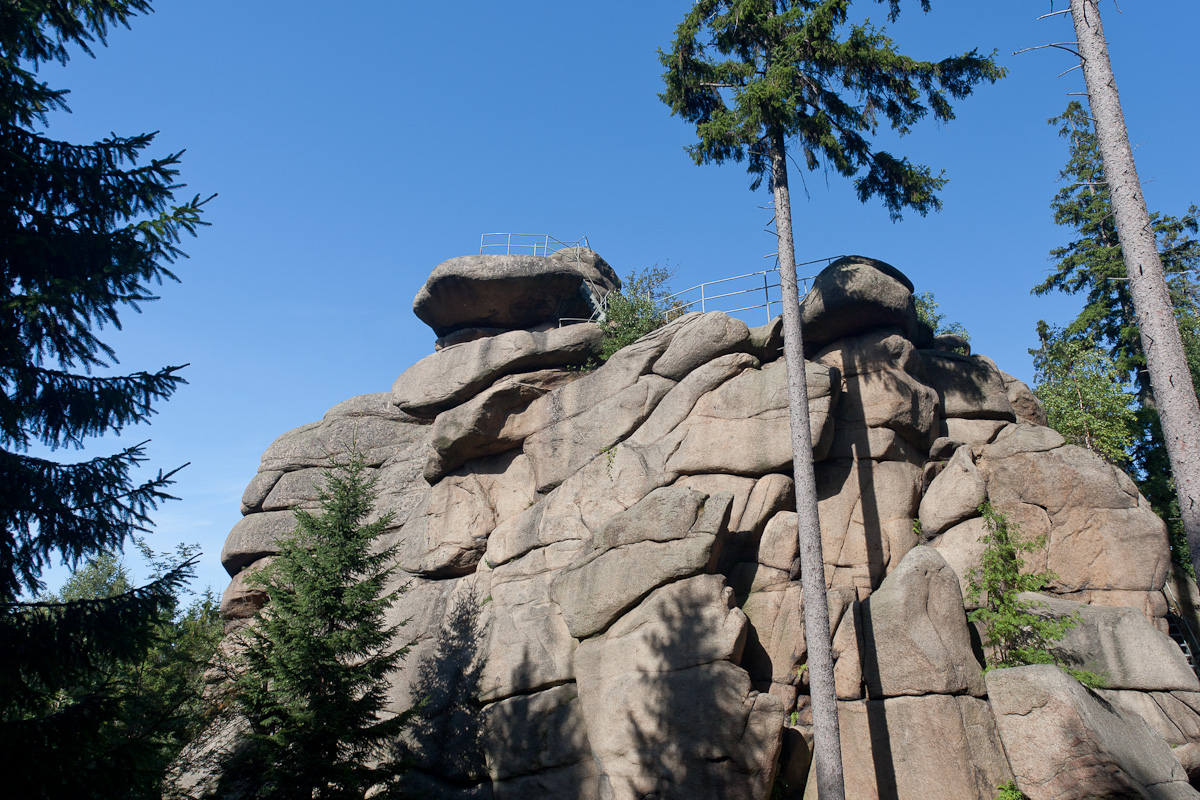

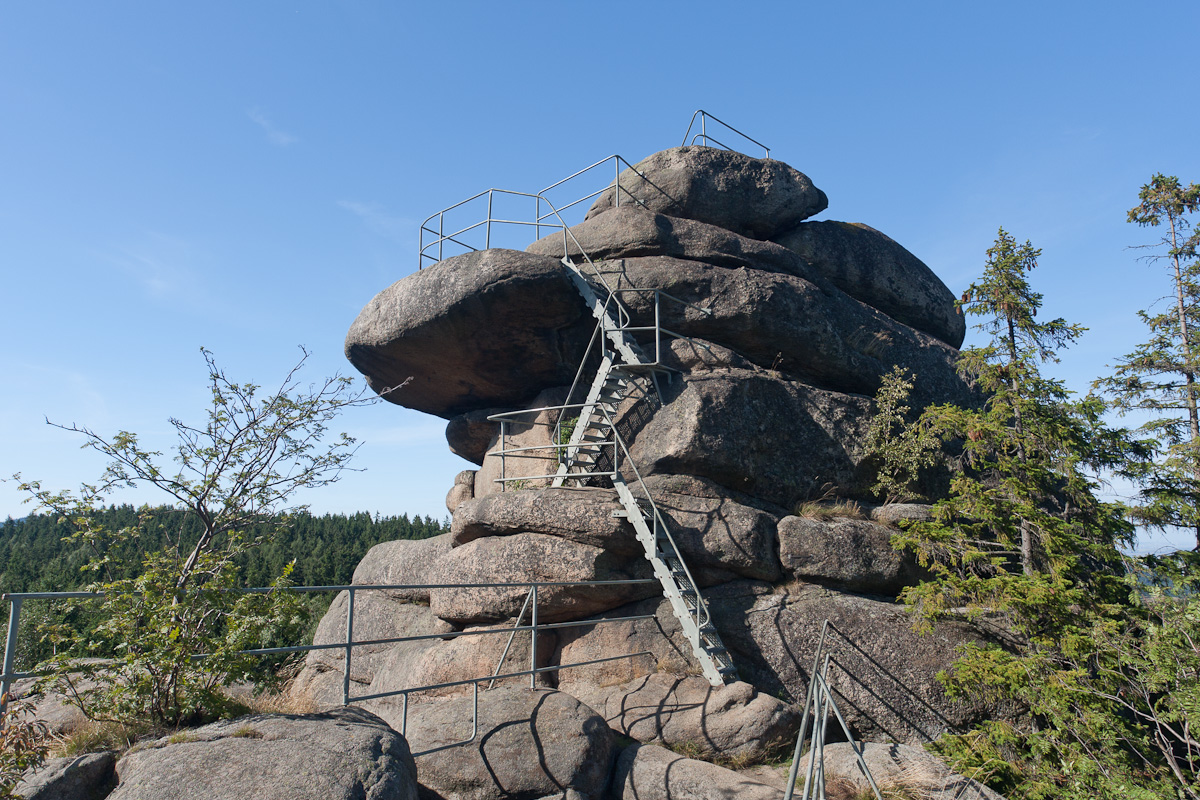

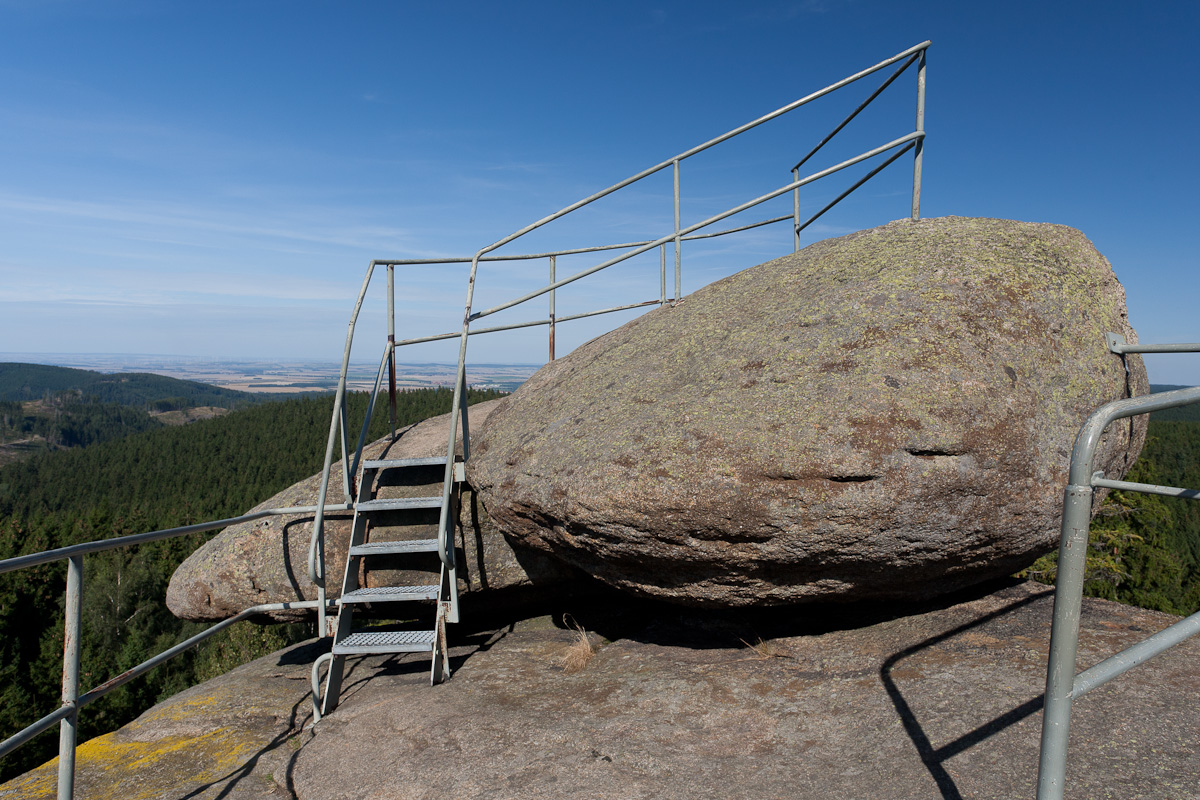

See also: Rock formations in the Harz
