= Dyke Ditch =

Geographical engineering feature

Coordinates: 51°48′10″N 10°30′12″E

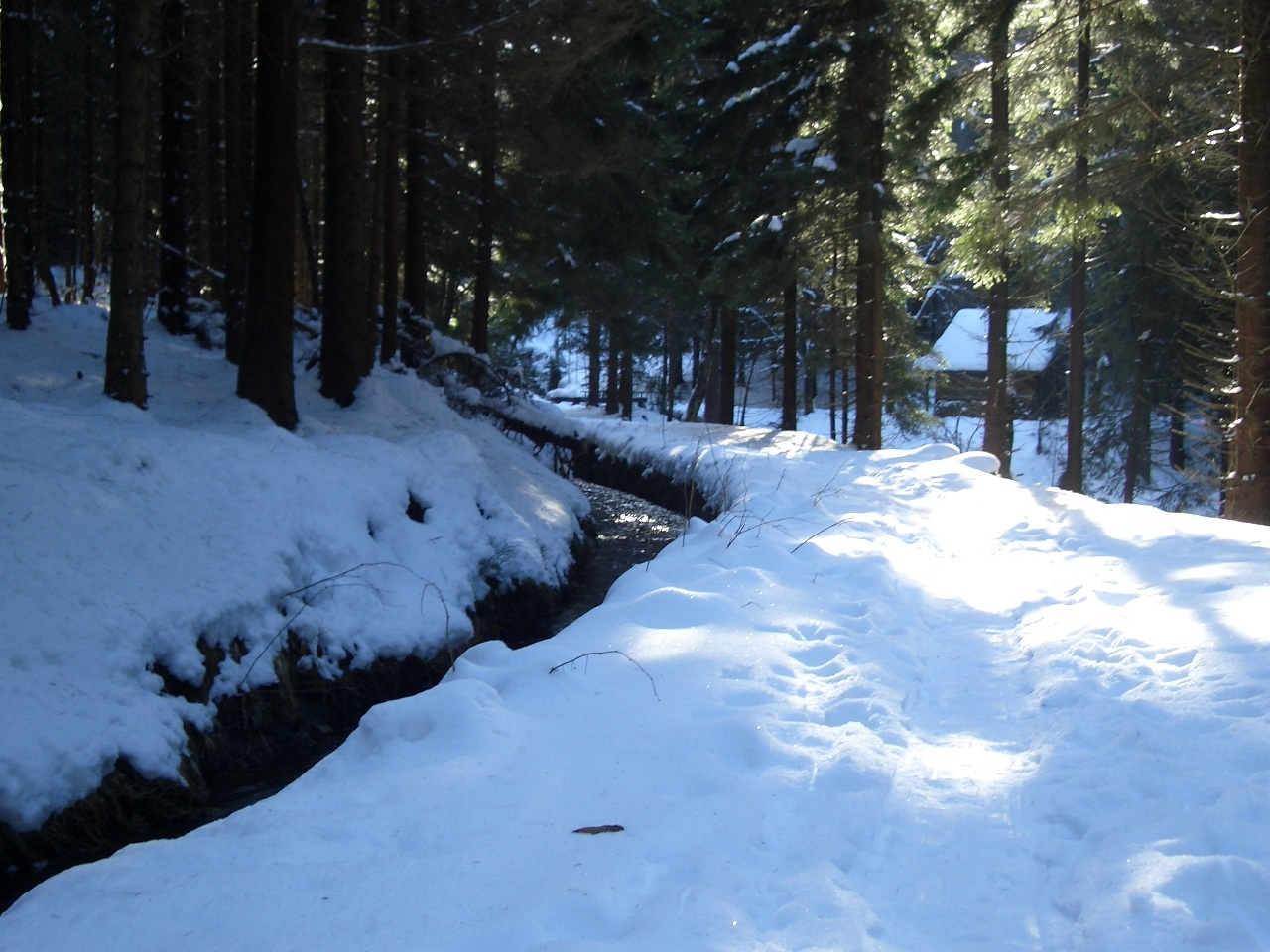
The Dyke Ditch

The Dyke Ditch (German: Dammgraben) is the longest artificial ditch in the Upper Harz in central Germany. Its purpose was to collect surface runoff for the operation of the Upper Harz mining industry from precipitation-heavy regions a long way away (particularly from the Bruchberg and parts of the Brocken massif). It was laid in 1732 and continually extended eastwards until 1827. Its original length was about 25 km; this was successively shortened by water tunnels between 1820 and 1861 to around 19 km. It is a central component of the Upper Harz Water Regale. Its takes its name from the Sperberhai Dyke which is, in fact, an embankment on top of which the Dyke Ditch runs in an aqueduct in order to cross a depression.

== History ==
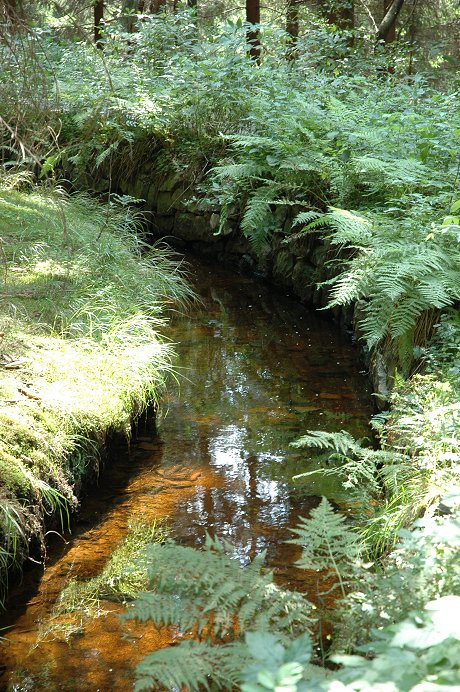
Ditch near Altenau

The history of the Dyke Ditch was initially closely related to the history of the Sperberhai Dyke. Not until the completion of the dyke in 1734 could large watercourses east of Clausthal be tapped into: the streams of the Großer and Kleiner Gerlachsbach. In the years that followed, the Dyke Ditch was continually extended eastwards. In 1736 it was extended as far as the Kleiner Oker. In 1742, a neighbouring ditch, the Morgenbrodtstal Ditch, was built to carry water from the Große and Kleine Söse rivers to the Dyke Ditch. In 1774, it was lengthened as far as the so-called Wiege ("scales") on the Dyke Ditch and in 1820, after the two Kellwasser tunnels had been driven and the Blochschleife Ditch laid, the Kellwasser and the Blochschleife were connected to the Dyke Ditch system. The last addition was made in 1827, when the Clausthal Flood Ditch, the Flörichshai Ditch and Abbe Ditch enabled water from east of the Bruchberg and the western Brocken to be made available for the Upper Harz mines. Yet another extension would have been possible but was no longer discussed. Now, attempts were made to fundamentally solve the energy problem in the Upper Harz mines by building deeper drainage adits (such as the Ernst August Adit). In addition from the second half of the 19th century other forms of energy (steam engines) were brought into operation, initially alongside water power.

In the middle of the 19th century work was carried out to optimise water flow in area of the 10 km long section between Sperberhai Dyke and Clausthal. By cutting tunnels, several ditch detours around mountains were able to be shortened considerably. In addition to clear advantages in the maintenance overhead and winter operations, the increase in incline (the same drop being covered in a shorter distance) played an important role in increasing the hydraulic capacity. The water tunnels, built around 1850, were the Rothenberg, Coventhai, Dietrichsberg and Bielenwiese Tunnels.

During its middle years the Dyke Ditch could carry up to 13 million cubic metres of water per year over the Sperberhai Dyke to the Clausthal Plateau. That made it one of the most important lifelines in the Upper Harz mining region.

Following the closure of the mines the Dyke Ditch supplied water up to about 1978 for the generation of electricity in Kaiser Wilhelm Shaft. Since 1978 the water of the Dyke Ditch has been led to the Mönch valley of the Oker Reservoir at the end of the Dyke Ditch, where it still drives turbines for the generation of electricity and is then made available for the drinking water supplies of the Harzwasserwerke.

Until about 2000, the Dyke Ditch also provided drinking water to the mining town of Altenau. This has since been withdrawn because the natural water supply was very unreliable, especially in winter and the quality of the water could also change very quickly.

The operator of the Dyke Ditch today is the Harzwasserwerke.

== Catchment area ==
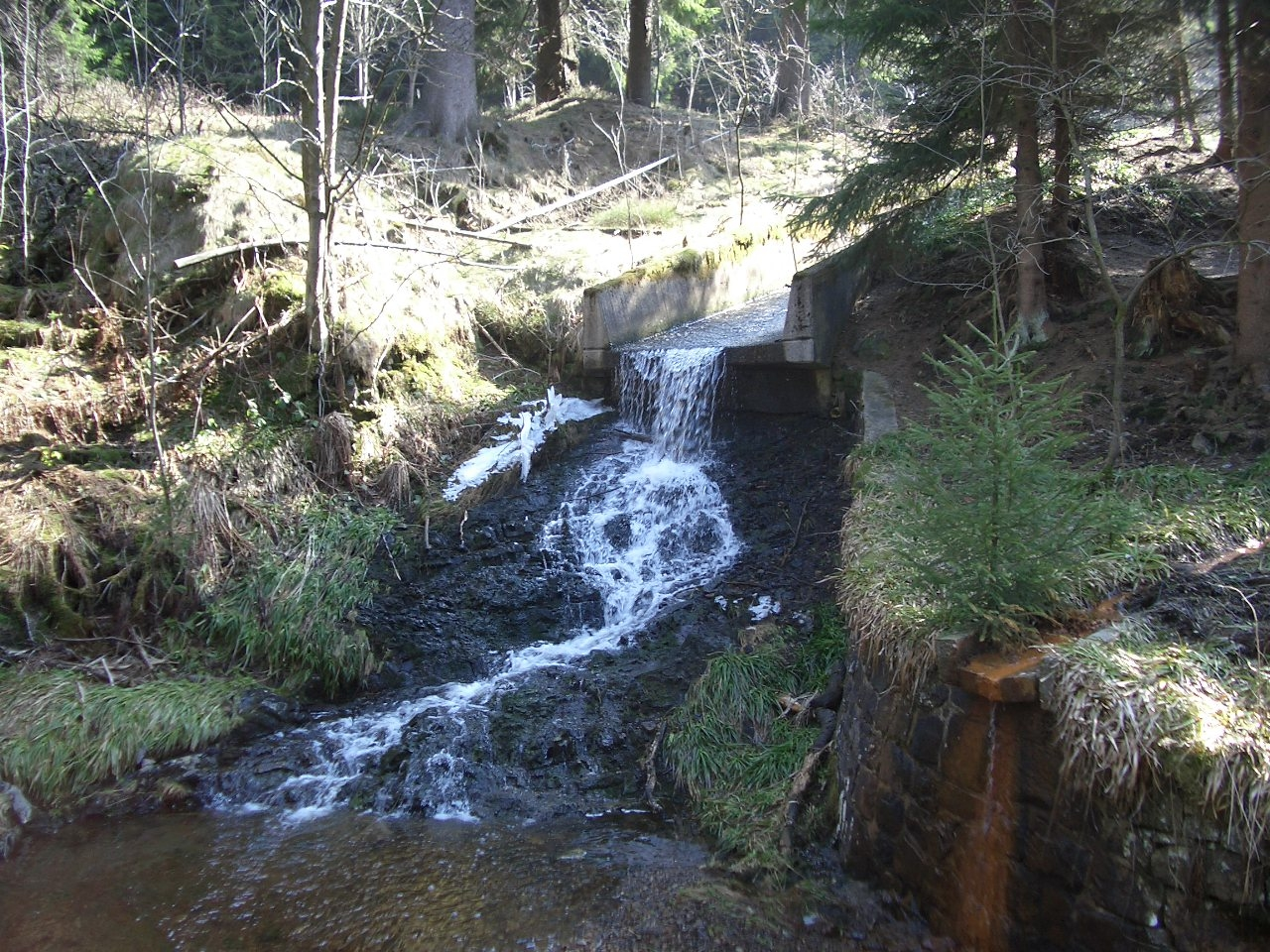
Outlet of the Großer Gerlachbach into the Dyke Ditch between Altenau and the dam house

The Dyke Ditch draws its water from the region of six Harz rivers:

- Söse over the Morgenbrodstal Ditch (1715–1718; length 3,970 m)
- Sieber over the Clausthal Flood Ditch (also called the Rotenbeeke Ditch) (1797; length 3,900 m)
- Oder over the Clausthal Flood Ditch and the Flörichshai Ditch (1826; length 1,050 m)
- Ecker over the Abbe Ditch (1827; length 1,540 m)
- Radau over the Abbe Ditch
- Oker over the Dam Ditch (1725–1840; length 14,690 m)

The Dyke Ditch system crosses several watersheds as a result.

== Statistics ==
The Dyke Ditch today is 19 km long. 15.4 km of that are open ditches and 3.6 km are underground water tunnels. Depending on how they are counted, its associated ditch system has an overall length of 49 km. On most routes the water descends by around 60 m. Its flow rate reaches a maximum of about 1 m^{3}/s.

== Footpath ==
A footpath from Osterode to Thale, the Harzer Hexenstieg ("Harz Witches' Climb"), runs along the Dam Ditch.

== Sources ==
- "Der Dammgraben".
- "Gräben" (PDF). Harzwasserwerke. Archived from the original (PDF; 82 kB) on 19 July 2011.
