= Muxklippe =

Granite rock formation in Germany

Coordinates: 51°51′01″N 10°34′42″E

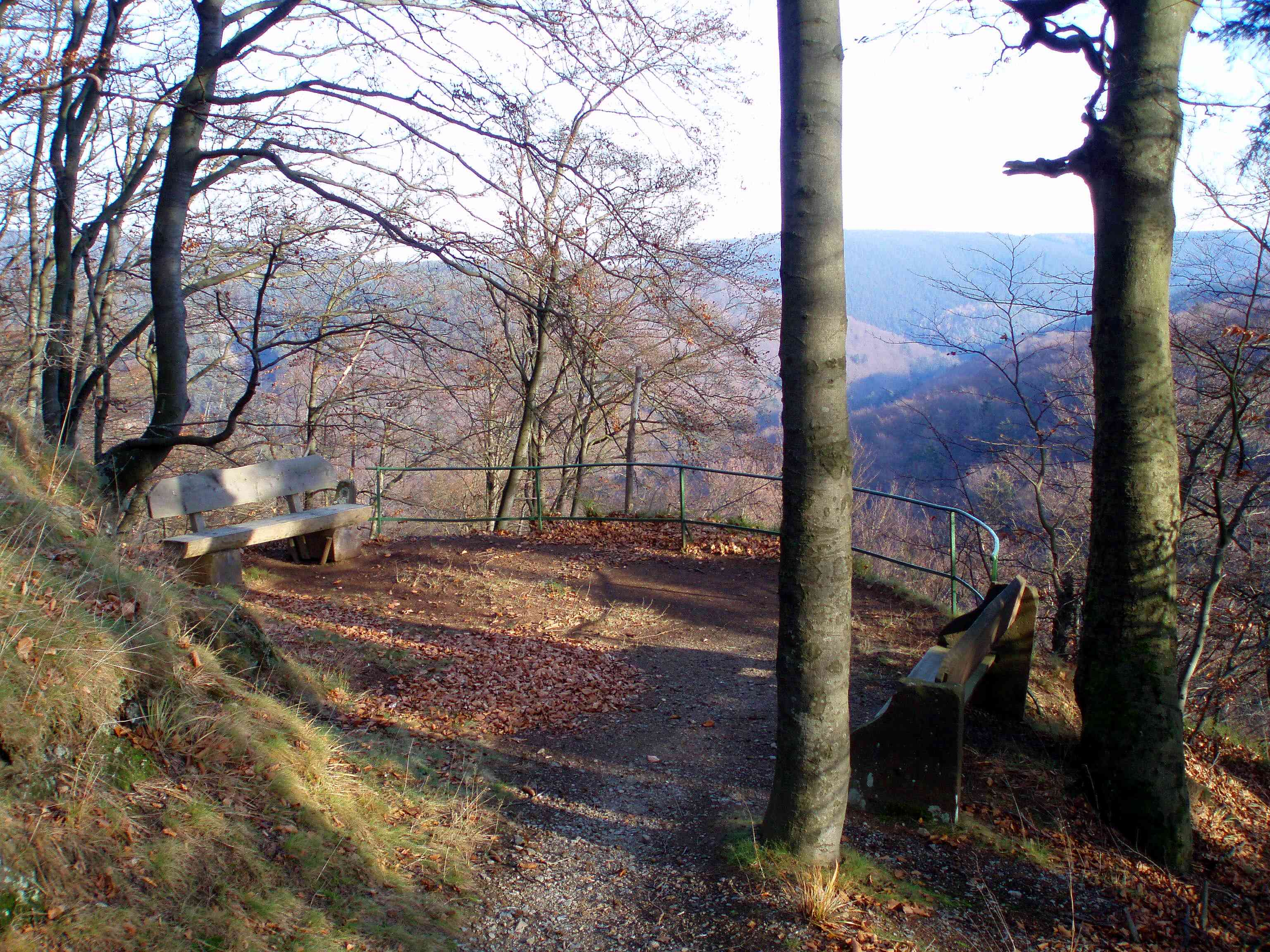
The Muxklippe

The Muxklippe is a granite rock formation in the Harz National Park in Germany.

== Geographical location ==
The Muxklippe is located in the Harz mountains in Germany, southeast of Bad Harzburg, above the Ecker valley on the Kaiser Way footpath, a few hundred metres away from the border between Lower Saxony and Saxony-Anhalt. The upper section of the crag is accessible on foot. From there, in good weather, there are views of the Ecker Reservoir and the Brocken, the highest mountain in the Harz.

== History ==
Immediately next to the Muxklippe a war memorial was erected by Brunswick foresters in memory of the foresters who had fallen.

== See also ==
- Rock formations in the Harz
