= Bäumlersklippe =

Coordinates: 51°51′17.1″N 10°40′03.2″E

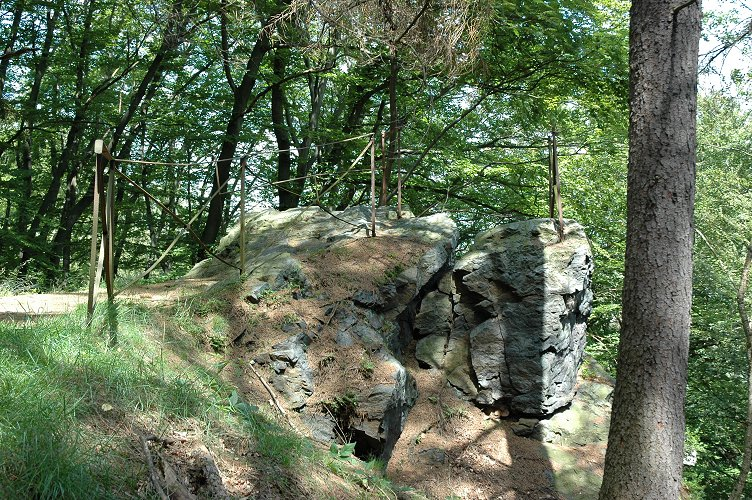
The Bäumlersklippe in 2007

The Bäumlersklippe is a crag and one of the so-called Harzklippen (Harz rock formations) in the Harz National Park southwest of Ilsenburg.

The crag was restored as a travel destination in 2019. Specifically, an information board and bench were installed and the outlook railing was restored. The Borkenkäferpfad (Bark beetle path) connects Ilsenburg to the crag and other points in the Harz rock formations.

It has been recommended by several travel guides, especially noted for its expansive views.

The crag derives its name from a hunter, Bäumler. He is supposed to have stabbed and killed his only son out of jealousy and then thrown himself off this rock to his death. This legendary family drama was picked up on by Theodor Fontane and used in his story, Ellernklipp.

== See also ==
- List of rock formations in the Harz
