= Hahnenklee Crags =

Coordinates: 51°44′06″N 10°33′50″E

The Hahnenklee Crags (German: Hahnenkleeklippen) are a rock formation west of Braunlage in the district of Goslar in Lower Saxony, Germany. They consist of hornfels.

== Walking destination ==
The Hahnenklee Crags are a popular walking destination and can be reached from Königskrug or Braunlage. From the Hahnenklee Forest Road (Hahnenkleer Waldstraße) a 250 metre long path branches off to the 740 metre high viewing point. Further west the terrain drops 200 m almost vertically to the Oder river. On the opposite side, 800 metres away, the High Crags (Hohen Klippen) on the Rehberg (893 m) border the Oder valley.

The crags are checkpoint no. 75 in the Harzer Wandernadel hiking network.

== Origin of the name ==
The Hahnenklee Crags have nothing to do with the village of Hahnenklee in the Harz, but are derived from Hahnenkliev, which also means Hohe Klippen or "high crags".

== See also ==
- List of rock formations in the Harz
