= Königsberg (Brocken) =

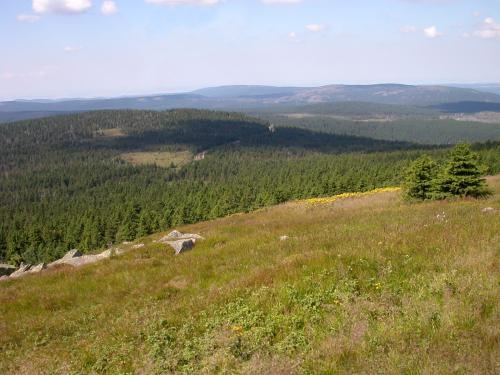

Highest point
- Elevation: 1,034 m above sea level (NN) (3,392 ft)
- Prominence: 39 m → Brocken
- Isolation: 1.1 km → Brocken
- Coordinates: 51°47′20″N 10°35′58″E

Geography
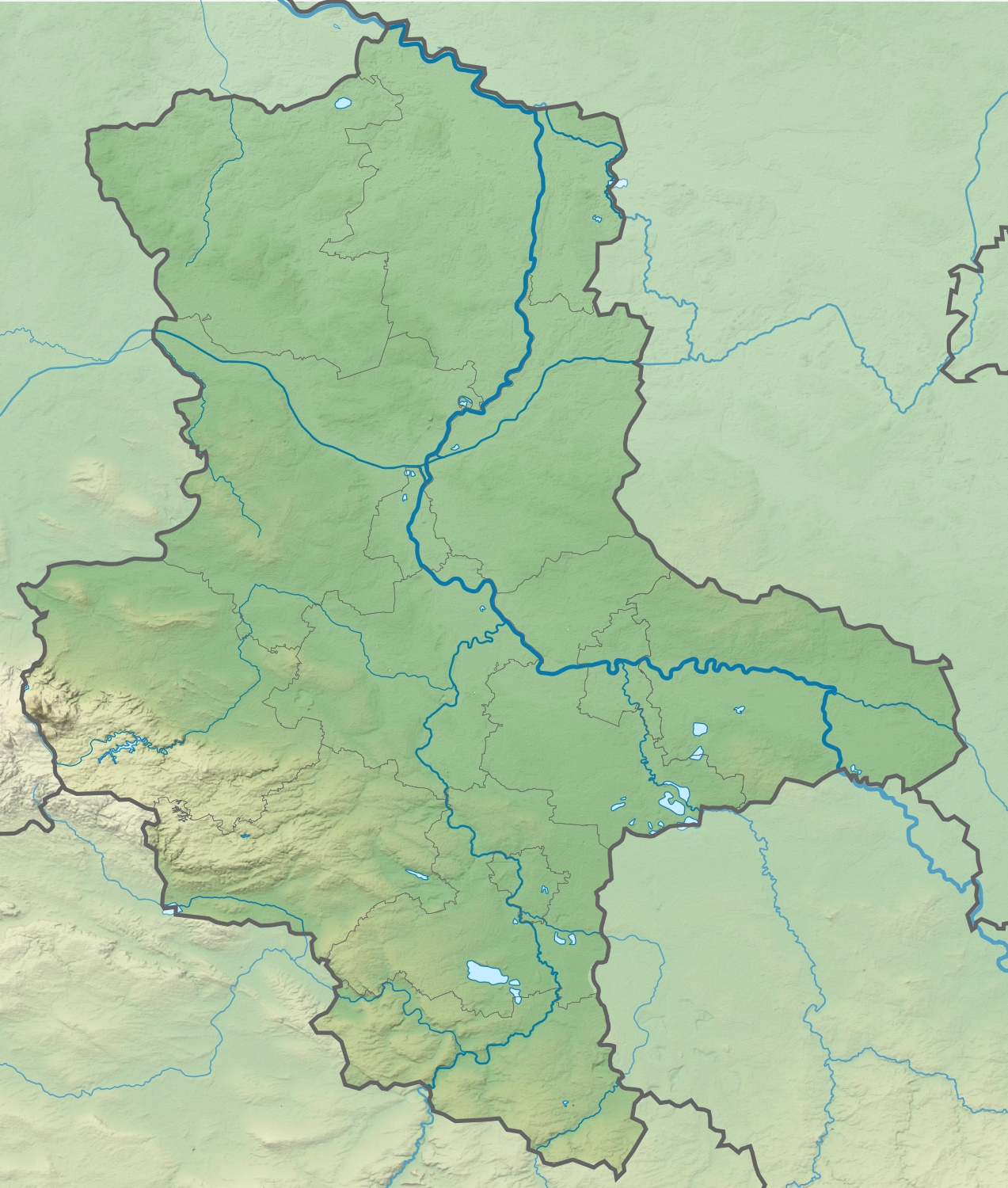
- Location within Saxony-Anhalt
- Location: Saxony-Anhalt, Germany
- Parent range: Harz Mountains

The Königsberg is a neighbouring peak of the Brocken and, at 1033.5 m above sea level the third highest elevation in the Harz mountains. It lies on a long ridge that runs from southeast to northwest about 1.5 km south of the Brocken's summit. Near its summit on the northwest side is the rock formation of Hirschhörner (max. 1,023.2 m). To the east the land descends to the Schwarze Schluftwasser, a small tributary of the Kalte Bode which flows south of the mountain. To the east on the far side of the Schwarzer Schluftwasser is the Heinrichshöhe (1,039.5 m), another subpeak of the Brocken.

== Geography and former access ==
The mountain is located in the heart of the national park and is out-of-bounds to walkers. Formerly two paths ran to the top:

- The Old Königsberg Way (alte Königsbergweg) began near Eckerloch and ran uphill, alongside the old Königsberg Quarry, and up to the Kanzelklippen crags. From there it ran over the Rabenklippe, the old Eckerloch ski jump, towards the Kesselklippe and then through the Goethe Moor to the station at Goetheweg. It ran along the entire ridge to the Hirschhornklippen.
- The Old Goethe Way (alte Goetheweg) began at Goetheweg station and crossed the Königsberg between Hirschhornklippen and Gipfelklippe. It then ran downhill alongside the Goethe Moor to the railway line at Neuen Goetheweg.

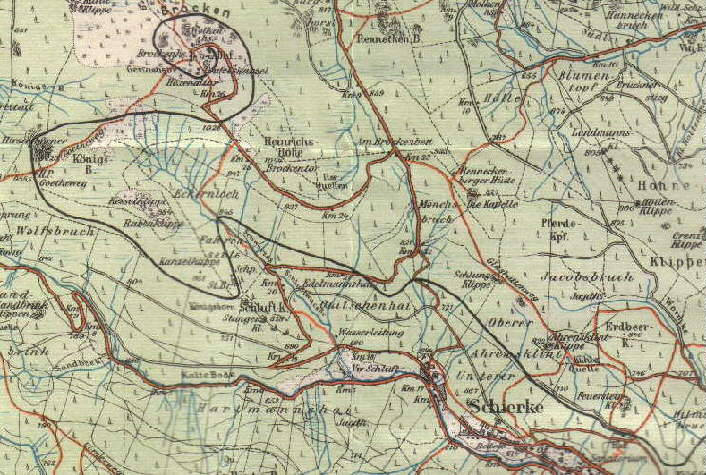
Map of the Königsberg ridge

== Crags ==
There are several prominent granite crags on the ridge. From east to west they are the:

- Stangenklippe,
- Schluftkopf,
- Kanzelklippen,
- several small unnamed crags,
- Rabenklippe,
- Kesselklippe,
- Summit of the Königsberg and the
- Hirschhornklippen (Hirschhörner).

The Stangenklippe and the pillar-shaped Schluftkopf used to be popular destinations and lie between the Brocken road and Brocken Railway (Brockenbahn). The Kanzelklippen consists of a group of several granite crags, some of which are over 20 m high. On the Rabenklippe is a fireplace about 70 cm in diameter, that has been hewn out of the granite. Its age is unknown. The Gipfelklippe is only about 1.5 m high.

== Gallery ==
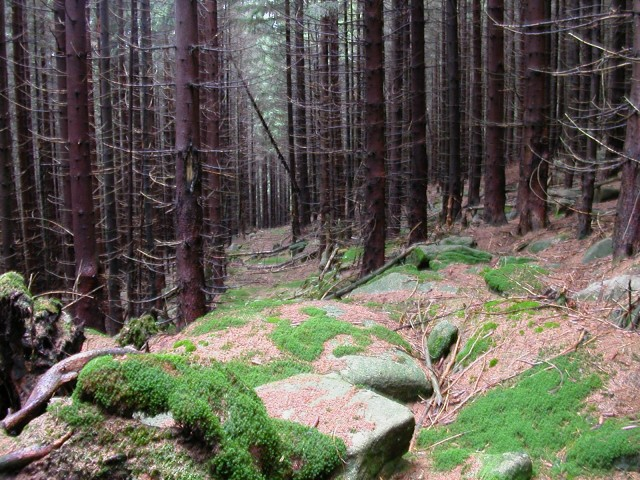
Old path to the Stangenklippe crag

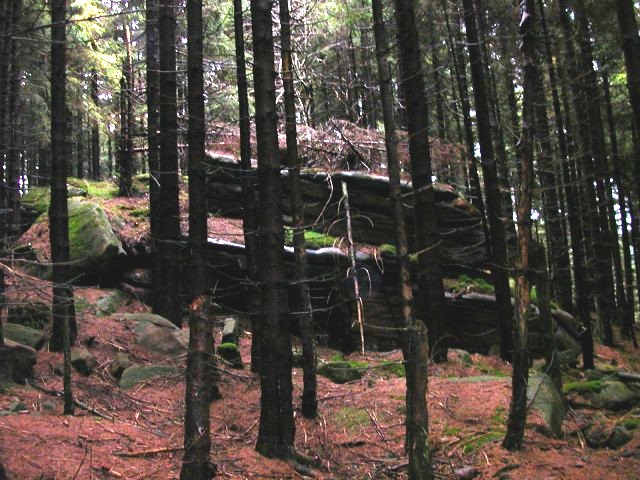
The Stangenklippe

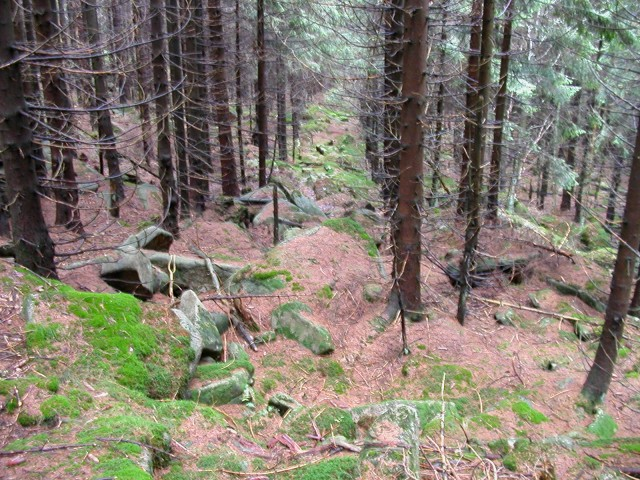
Old path by the Schluftkopf

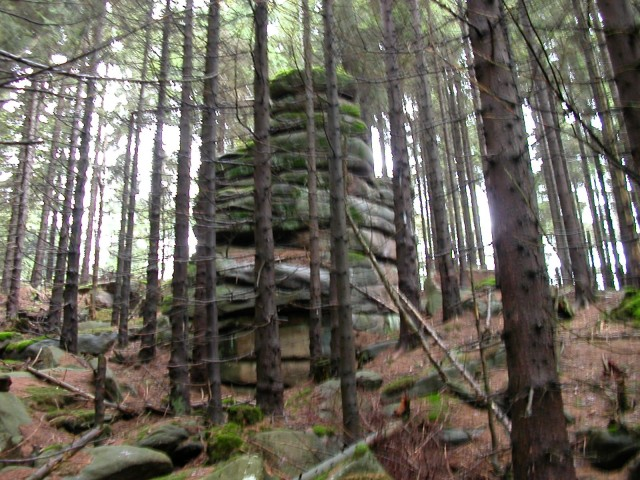
The Schluftkopf

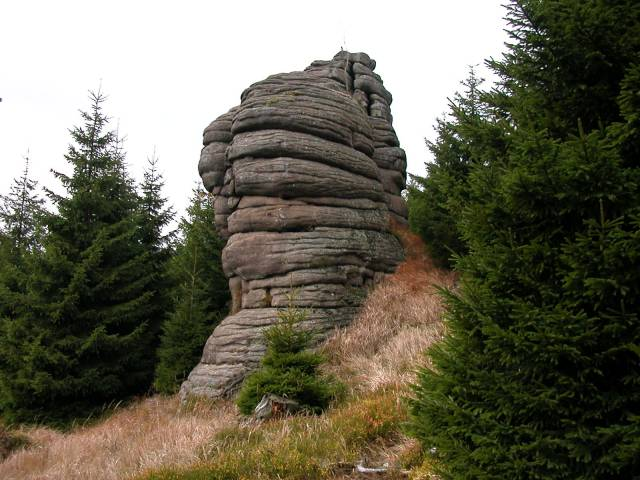
The Kanzelklippen

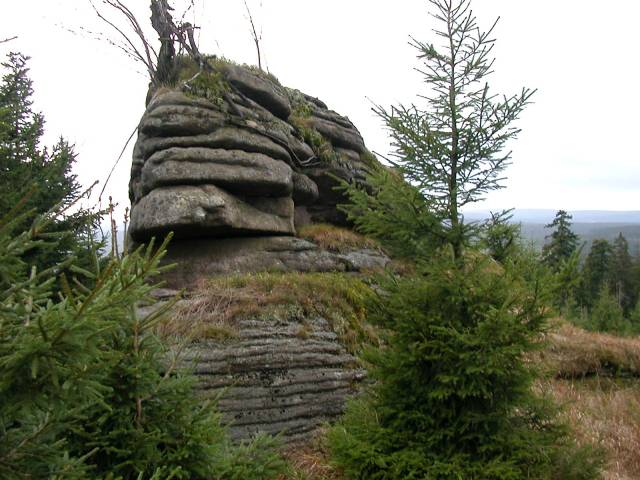
Small unnamed crag

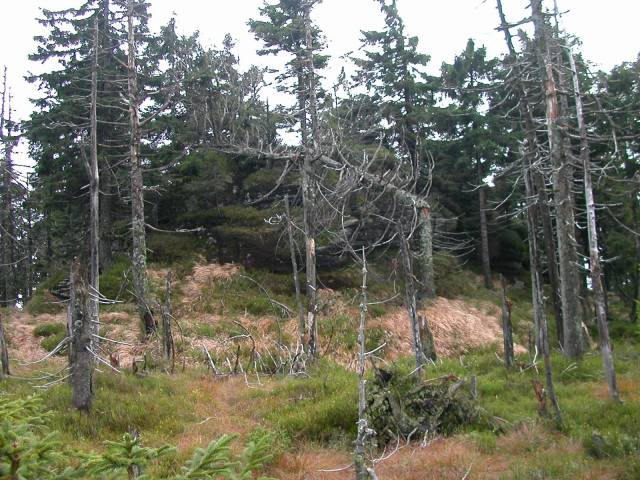
The Rabenklippe from the west

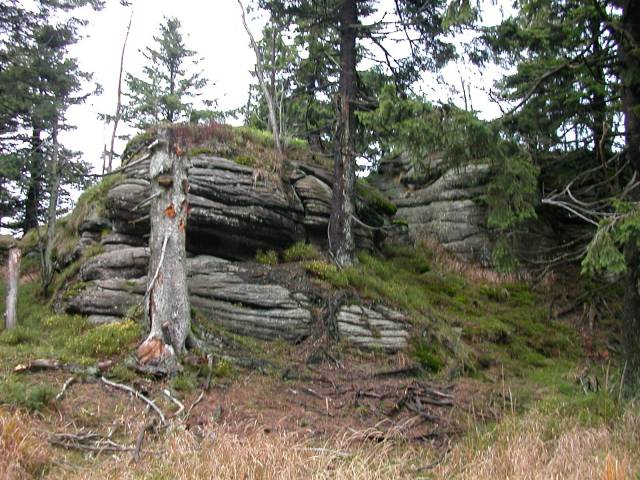
The Rabenklippe from the north

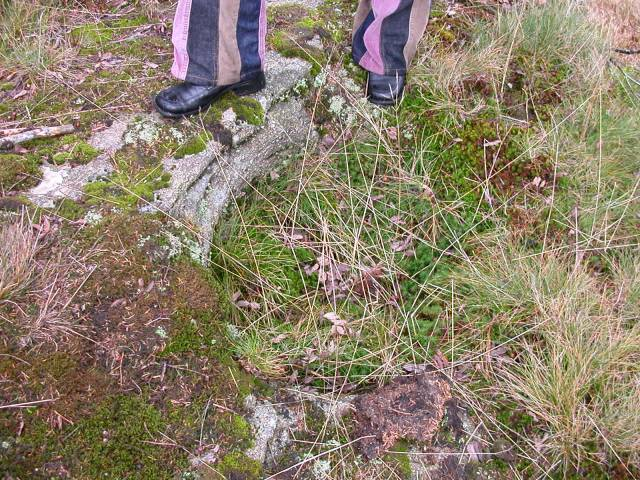
Fireplace on the Rabenklippe

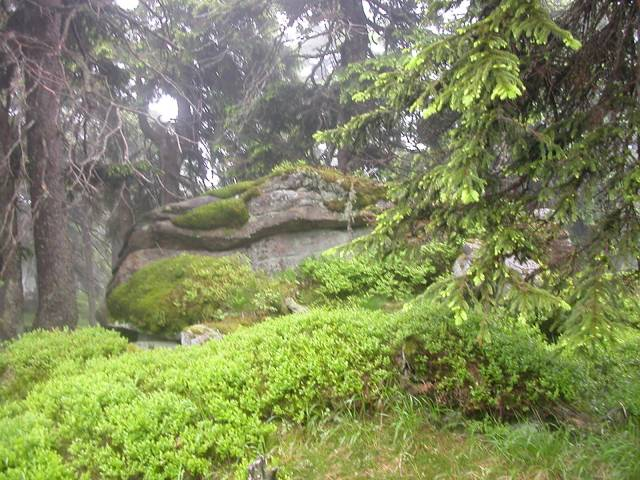
Königsberg, Gipfelklippe
