= Harzer Hexenstieg =

German footpath

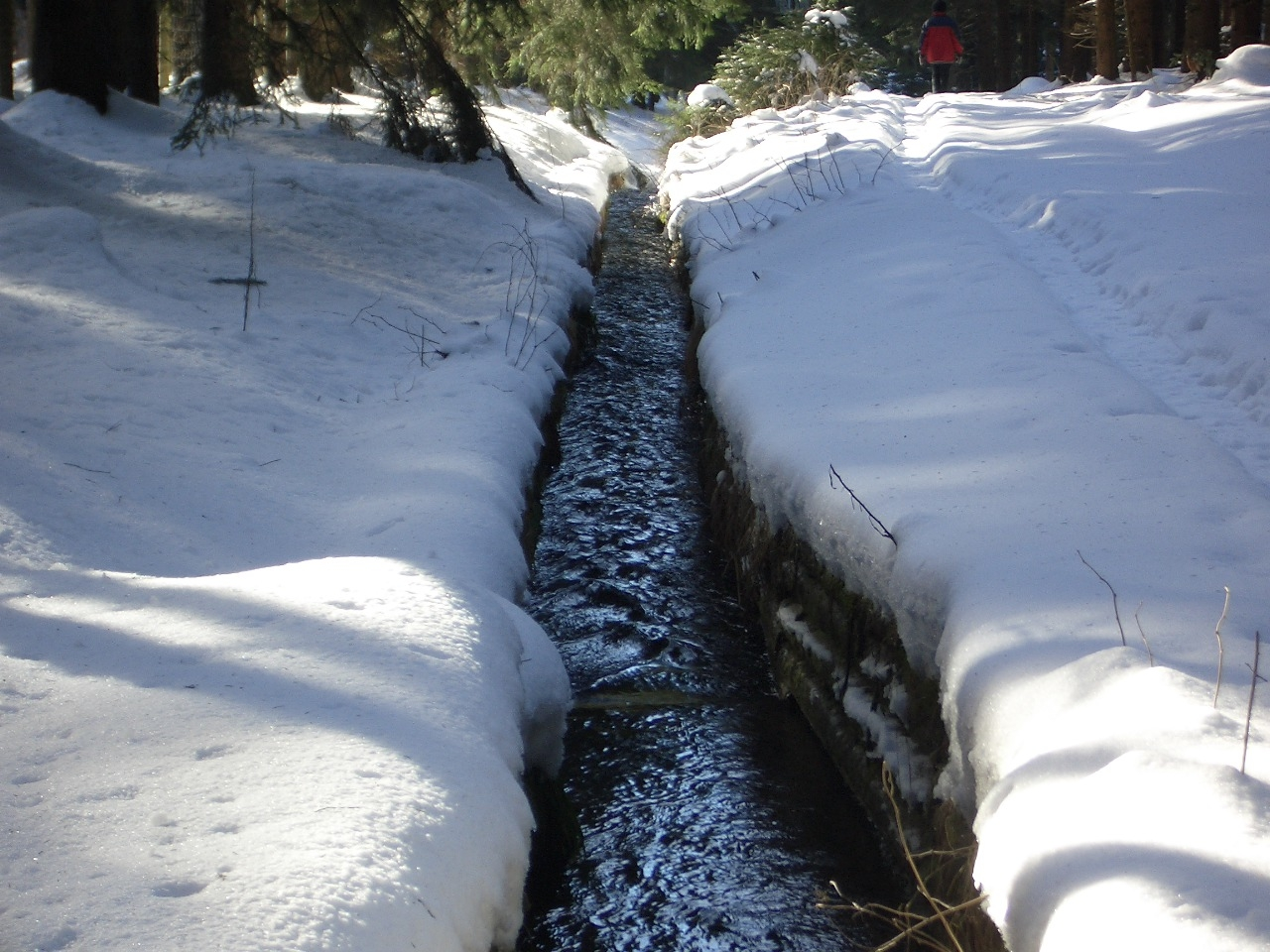
The Dyke Ditch

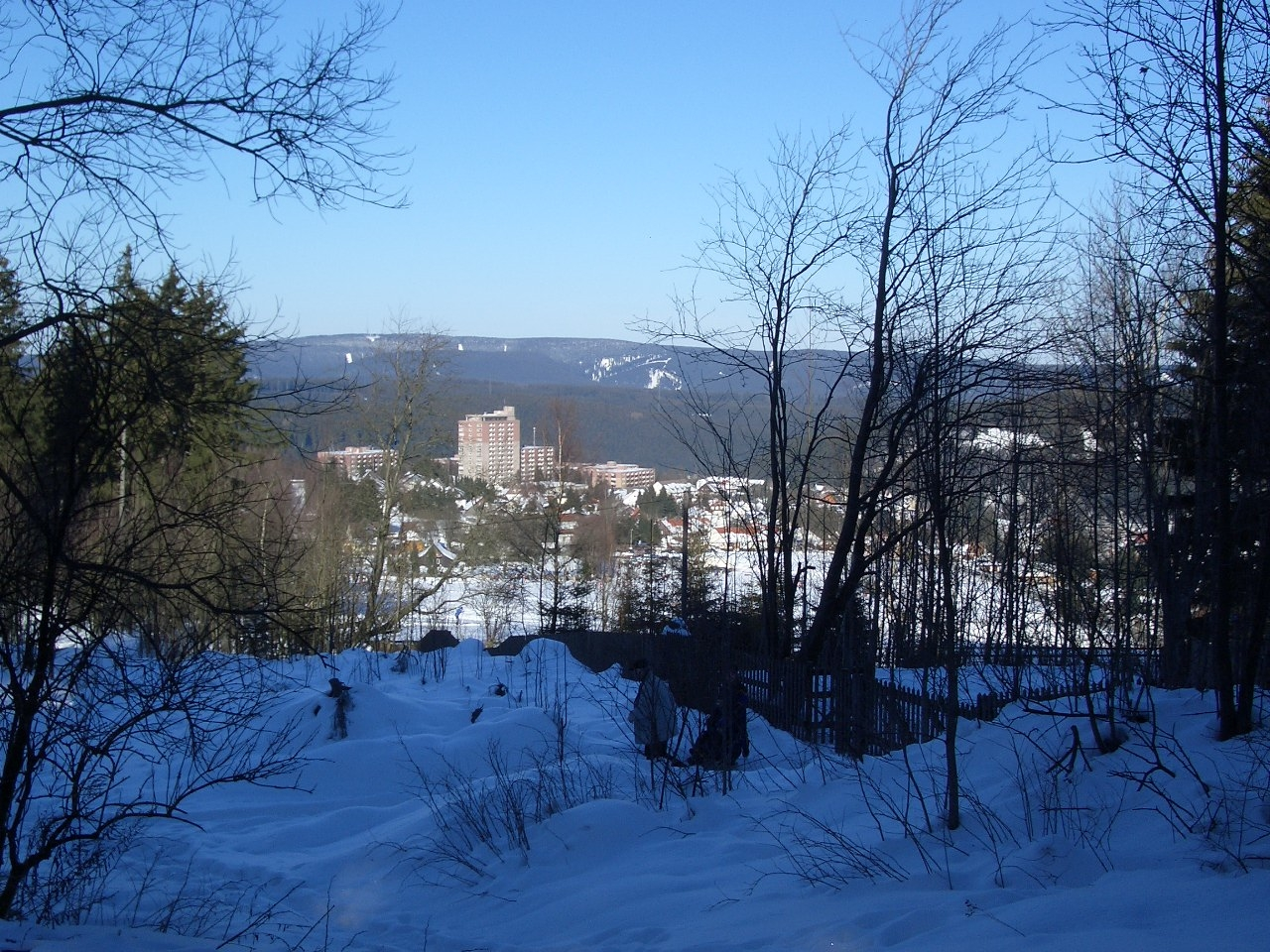
View of Altenau from the Grabenhaus Rose

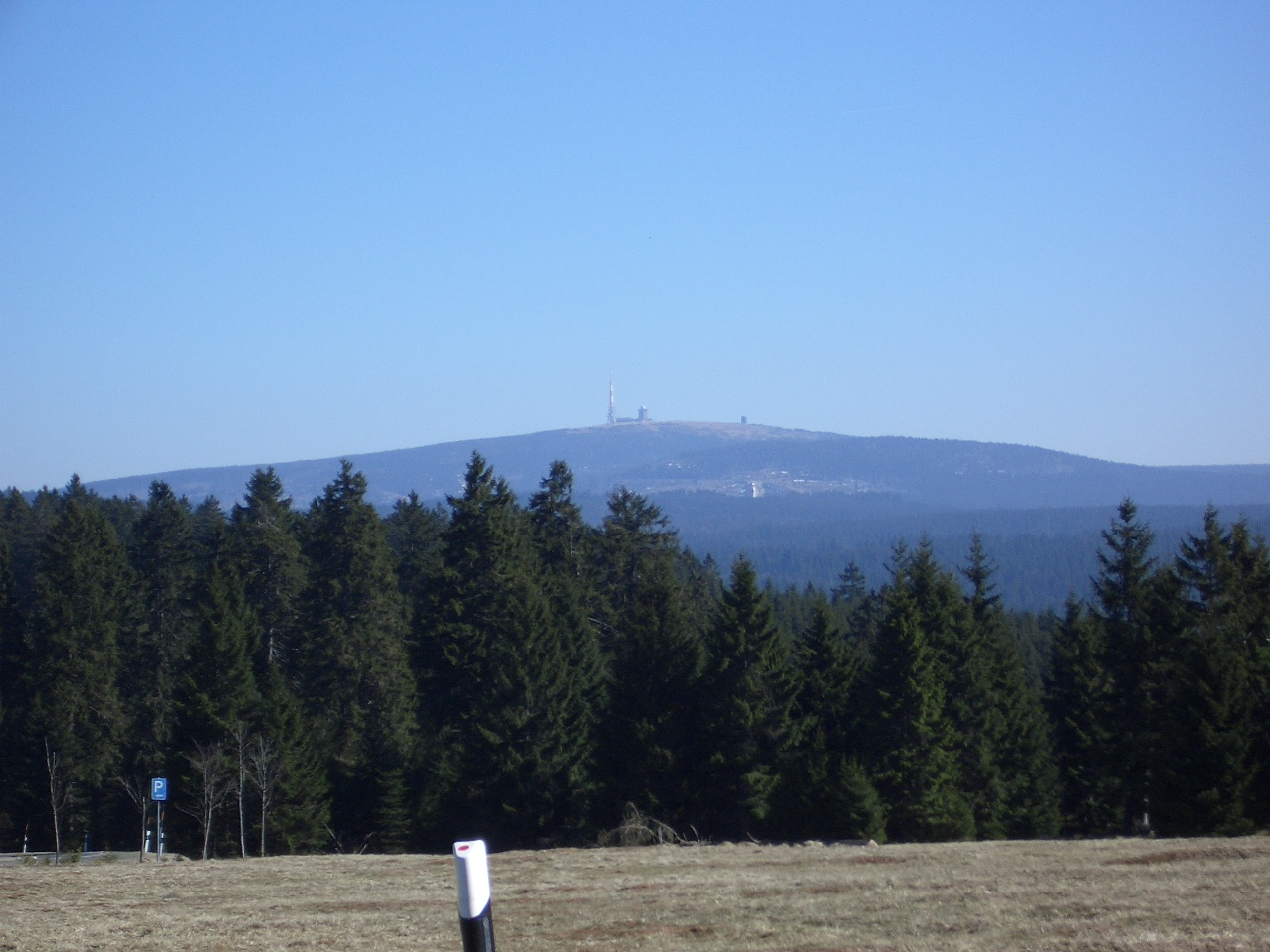
The Brocken

The Harz Witches' Trail (German: Harzer Hexenstieg) is a footpath, just under 100 km long, in Germany that runs from Osterode through the Harz mountains and over its highest peak, the Brocken, to Thale. It is a project by the Harz Transport Association and Harz Club and is part of the system of trails known as the Harzer Wandernadel.

== Footpath ==
The trail runs from Osterode via Lerbach to Buntenbock, which is in the borough of Clausthal-Zellerfeld and surrounded by the Upper Harz Ponds. The ponds are part of a cultural monument to the former mining industry of the Harz, known as the Upper Harz Water Regale and to which the Dyke Ditch belongs.

Following the Dyke Ditch, the path passes the Dam House as well as the Grabenhaus Rose which belongs to the town of Altenau. Passing the Förster Ludwig Platz and Naben Valley Waterfall the path reaches Torfhaus via the Steile Wand ("Steep Wall").

In Torfhaus the Witches' Trail splits into two routes. The main route runs along the Goethe Way to the Brocken, in places parallel to the Brocken Railway, and from there to Königshütte. An alternative route bypasses the Brocken and runs to other features of the Upper Harz Water Regale such as the Oderteich and the Rehberg Ditch. After passing Sankt Andreasberg and Braunlage this path rejoins the main route.

From Königshütte two alternative routes go to Altenbrak. One way runs through Rübeland along the Rübeland Railway, the other past the Rappbode Reservoir.

From Altenbrak the path continues to Thale, where the Harz Witches' Trail ends.

The name of the footpath is derived from the association of a number of sites with witches, including the Brocken and the Hexentanzplatz ("Witches' Dance Floor") in Thale and other sites such as the Bruchberg and Braunlage.

=== Accommodation ===
The trail cannot be walked in one day, and in any case there are many points of interest en route, including unspoiled areas of nature as well as cultural landscapes and quaint villages. There are several hostels and shelters where walkers may overnight:

- Osterode
- Buntenbock
- Altenau
- Torfhaus
  - Brocken
  - Drei Annen Hohne
- or
  - Sankt Andreasberg
  - Braunlage
  - Elend
- Königshütte
- Thale

=== Walking badge ===
There is a walking badge called the Harzer Hexenstieg for the total of 11 check points of the Harzer Wandernadel network of paths that may be found along the path.

== Walking maps and literature ==
- Harzer Hexen-Stieg, Offizielle Karte zum thematischen Wanderweg durch den Harz – walking map (1 : 30.000), Schmidt-Buch-Verlag, Wernigerode 2007, ISBN 978-3-936185-32-4
- Bauer, Hans & Krooß, Stefan, KartoGuide Harzer Hexen-Stieg, Der offizielle Führer mit Karte zum Wanderweg durch den Harz (inkl. Hexen-Stieg-Wanderkarte von 2007), Schmidt-Buch-Verlag, Wernigerode 2006, ISBN 978-3-936185-33-1
- Harzer-Hexen-Stieg – walking map (1 : 25.000), Publicpress, Geseke 2006, ISBN 3-89920-165-5
- Stein, Conrad: Harz: Hexenstieg, Outdoor-Handbuch Band 163, Conrad Stein Verlag 2005, ISBN 3-89392-563-5
