= Goetheweg station =

Railway station in Wernigerode, Germany

Bahnhof Goetheweg
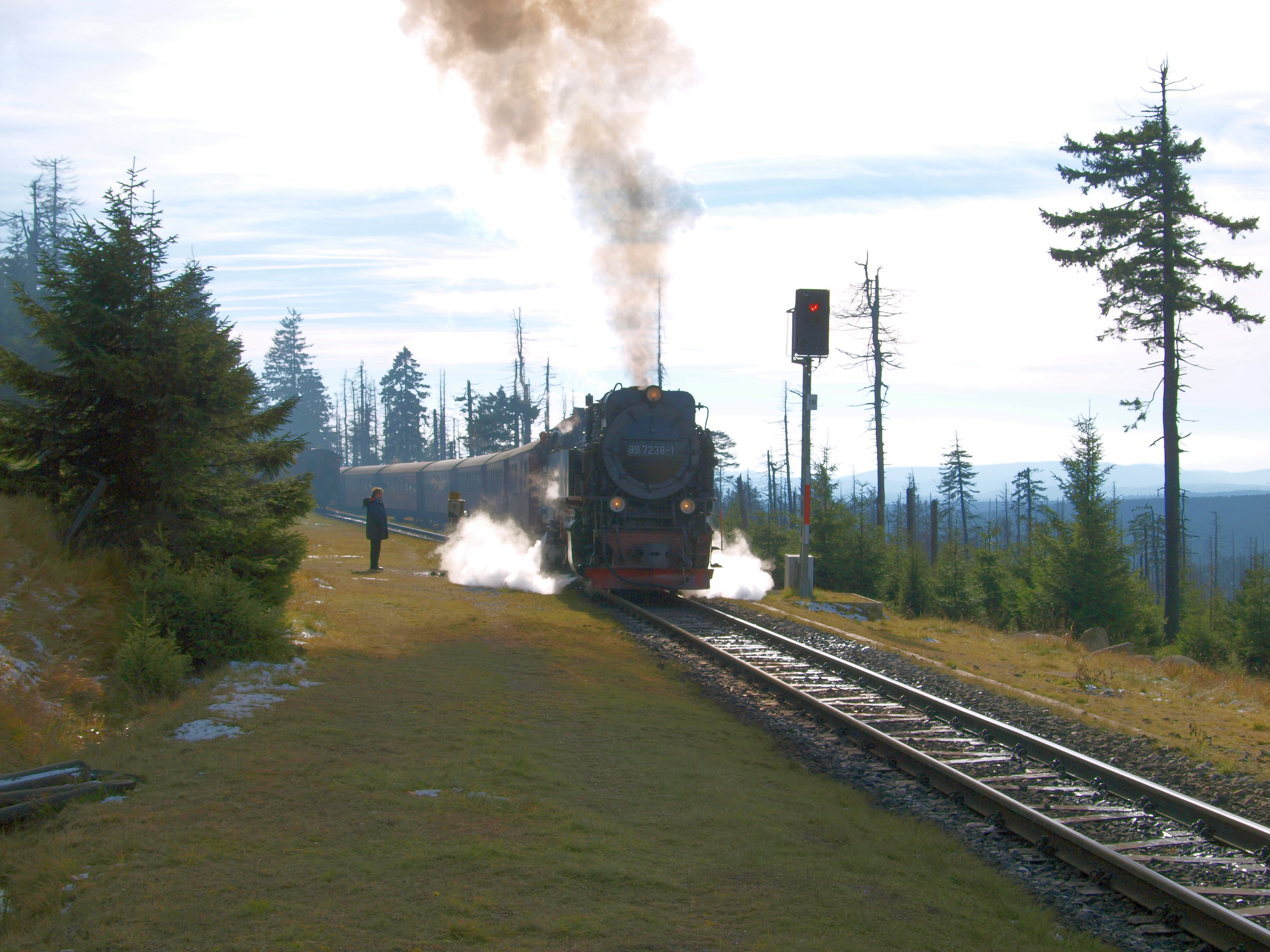
- Train crossing at Goetheweg

General information
- Location: Wernigerode, Saxony-Anhalt; Germany
- Coordinates: 51°47′18″N 10°35′37″E
- System: Depot
- Line: Brocken Railway (KBS 326)
- Platforms: 1

Other information
- Station code: Lgom

History
- Opened: 1900

Passengers
- none
Location
- Location within Saxony-Anhalt

Goetheweg station (German: Bahnhof Goetheweg) is located between the stations of Schierke and Brocken on the Brocken Railway in the Harz Mountains of Central Germany at a height of 956 m above sea level. The track layout today consists, as in the past, of a horizontal reversing track (Rückdrückgleis) and just one turnout, whilst the running line maintains its continuous gradient of 33 permille.

== History ==
The station was first opened on 17 July 1900. During the 1930s it was given a new station building, entry signals and accommodation for the track maintenance gang. The station was only manned by a stationmaster during the summer half-year because, in the winter, no trains ran on the Brocken Railway. After 1961 only goods trains worked the route and, in the 1980s, supply trains for the Brocken, usually moved by a pusher engine, terminated at Goetheweg station because of the increasingly poor condition of the permanent way.

All the buildings had been destroyed during the Second World War and had not been rebuilt. Since that time its facilities have only consisted of a garden bench and an operator control for the key lock. The station is not listed in the timetable and is only used as an operating point for train crossings. For a long time it was only equipped with So 5 railway signs (i.e. trapezium boards). Today, however, after changes to the operating system following the train accident in Thumkuhlental in 1994, signals have been installed again.

Above the station on the mountain of Königsberg in the Harz National Park are the rocky crags of the Hirschhornklippen which are not accessible.
