= Hirschhorn Crags =

Natural monument in Harz National Park, Germany

Coordinates: 51°47′25″N 10°35′43″E

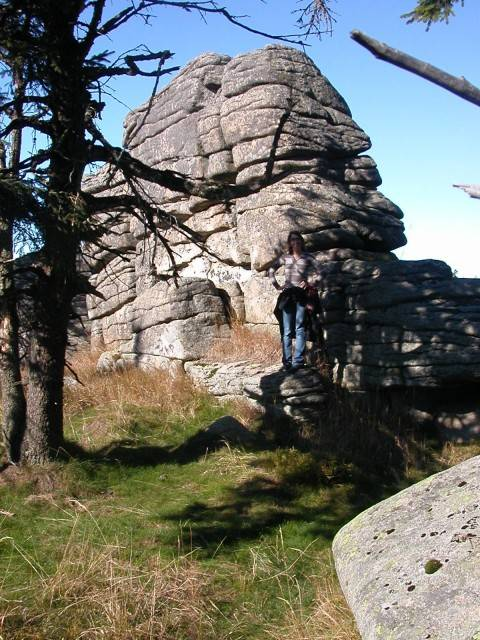
The Hirschhorns

The Hirschhorn Rocks (German: Hirschhornklippen or Hirschhörner) are a natural monument in the Harz National Park in central Germany.

== Geographical location ==
The Hirschhorn Rocks are one of the many tors in the Harz and are located on the Königsberg mountain above Goetheweg station only a hundred metres south of the Brocken in the Harz mountains. The highest point of this group of rocks is 1,023 metres (0,635 mi) above sea level. Because the tor in GDR times was right inside the border zone and now within the core zone of the Harz National Park, there is no public access to them. Administratively the crags lie within the borough of Wernigerode in the county of Harz.

== History ==
The tor was first mentioned in the records in 1571 in the phrase an den Hirsch Hornern (on the Hirsch Horner). Other early mentions include: in 1587 zwischen den Hartzhernern und dem Könnigesbergk (between the Harztherner and the Könnigesbergk), in 1667 unter den Hirschhören (below the Hirschhören), in 1709 as the Hirschhörner and in 1725 as the Hirschhornerklippe.

The border ran right between the Hirschhorns between the County of Wernigerode and the District of Harzburg in the old Duchy of Brunswick. A border cross carved into one of the rocks bears witness to the fact.

Due to their unique appearance the Hirschhorn Rocks were once a popular destination for Brocken walkers. From 1961 to 1989 they lay immediately on the Inner German Border within East Germany's border zone and were not accessible. Now they are inside the core zone of the Harz National Park and may only be visited as part of a guided walk accompanied by a National Park warden.

== See also ==
- List of rock formations in the Harz
