= Barenberg (Schierke) =

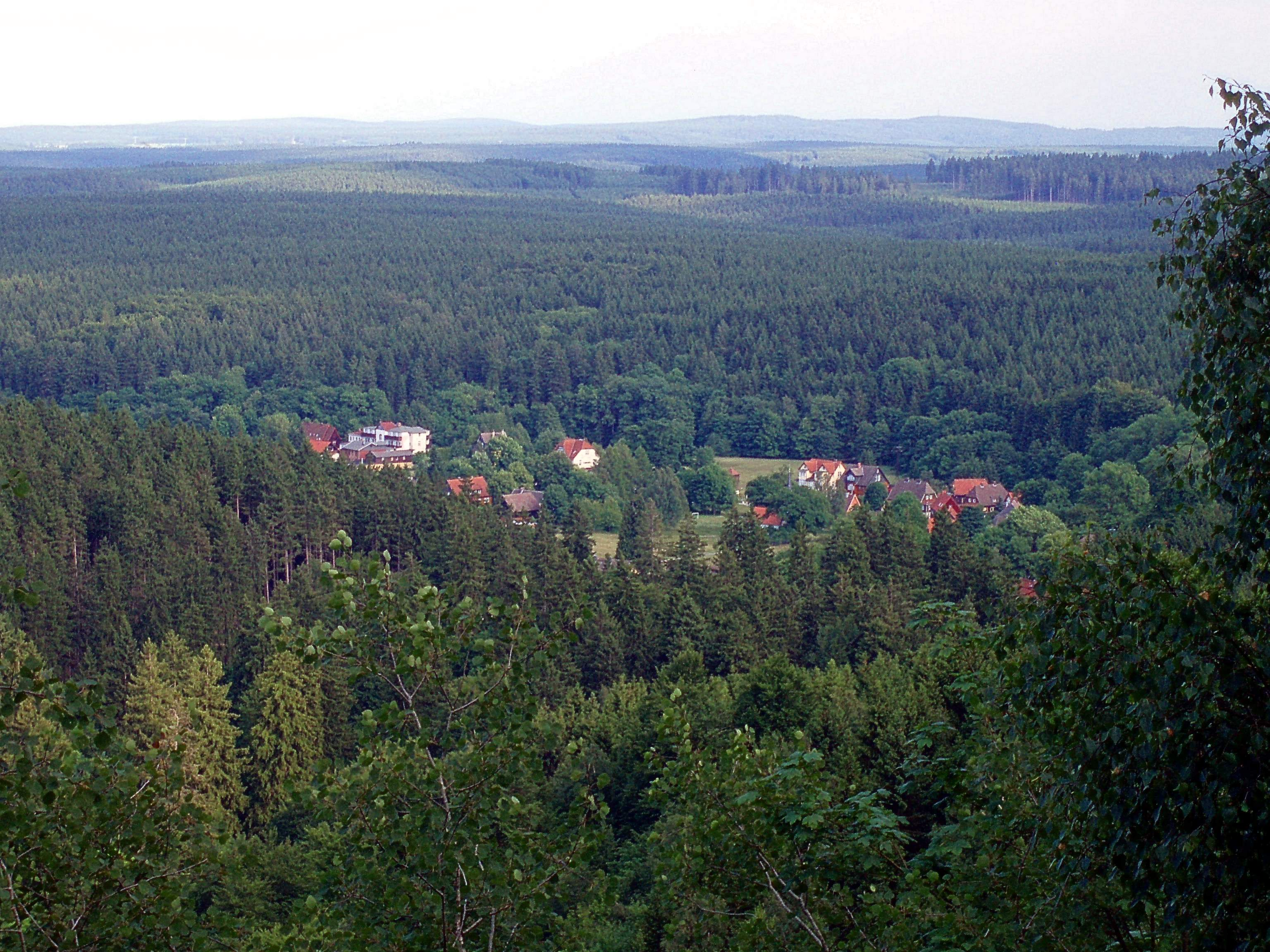
- View from the Barenberg of Elend

Highest point
- Elevation: 695.5 m above sea level (NN) (2,282 ft)
- Coordinates: 51°45′13″N 10°40′15″E

Geography
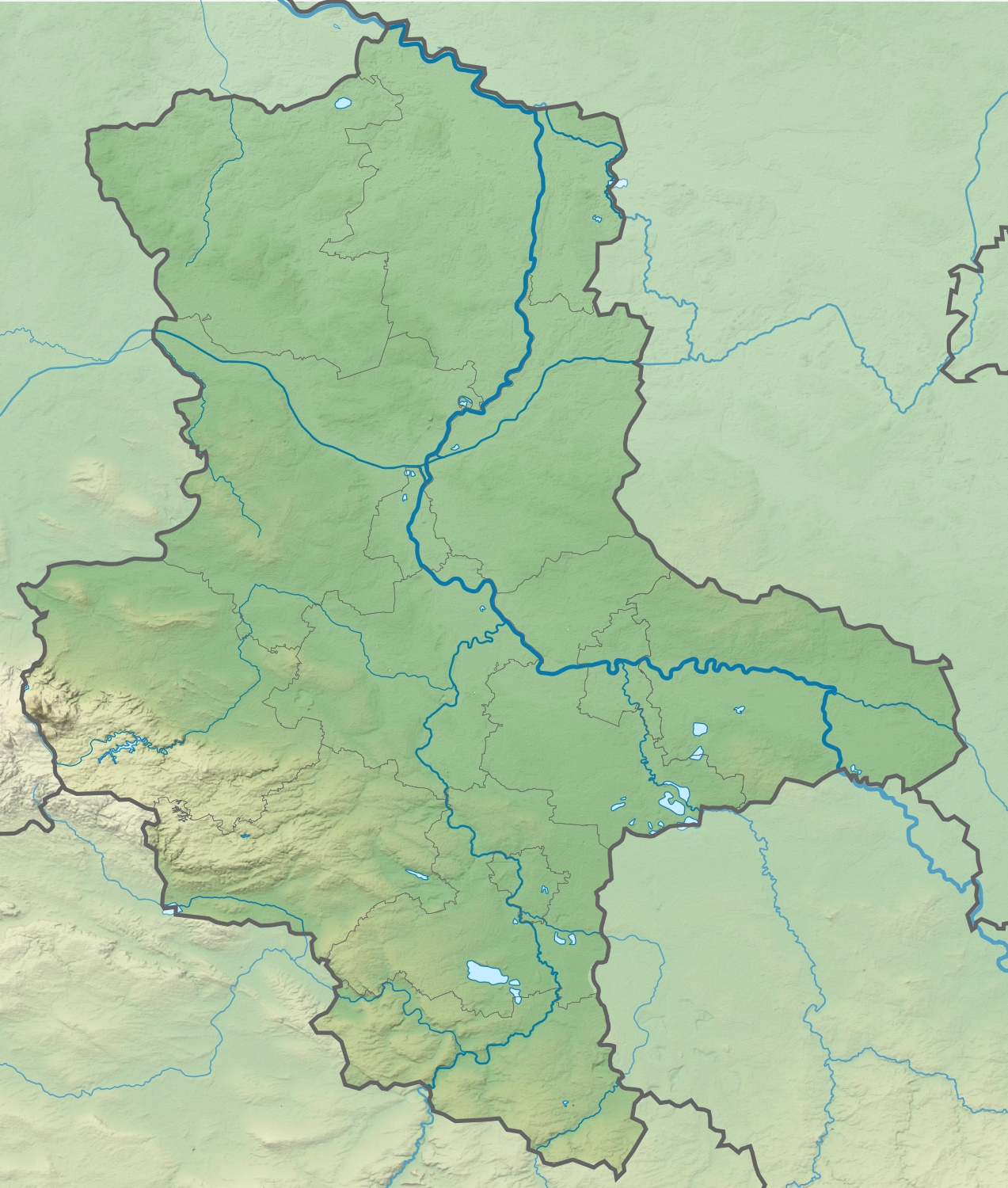
- Location within Saxony-Anhalt
- Location: near Schierke, Harz county, Saxony-Anhalt
- Parent range: Harz Mountains (Upper Harz; High Harz)

The Barenberg, also called the Bärenberg or Bärenkopf, is a mountain, 695.5 m above sea level (NN), in the Harz Mountains of Germany near the village of Schierke, Harz county, in the state of Saxony-Anhalt.

== Location ==
The Barenberg rises in the Upper Harz (High Harz) within the Harz/Saxony-Anhalt Nature Park. It lies around 1.3 km south-southeast of Schierke, a village on the Kalte Bode stream in the borough of Wernigerode, and about 1.5 km northwest of Elend on the same river, a village in the borough of Oberharz am Brocken.

Towards the northwest the forested country of the Barenberg runs west past Schierke to the Brocken (1,141.1 m), the highest mountain in the Harz. Its neighbouring peak to the north-northeast on the other side of Schierke is the rather higher Erdbeerkopf (847.7 m), a spur of the Hohnekamm ridge (900.6 m). To the south-southeast lies the Rauher Jakob (568.6 m) and, to the west-northwest is the mountain cluster of the Wurmberg (971.2 m), Großer Winterberg (906.4 m) und Kleiner Winterberg (837.0 m).

On or near the mountain are several granite tors: the Schnarcherklippen (west-northwest), the Mäuseklippe (northwest) and the Scherstorklippen (west-southwest).

Towards the northeast, east and southeast the countryside around the Barenberg drops into the Elend valley (Elendstal), rimmed by tors and designated as a nature reserve (NSG No. 162919) with its river, the Kalte Bode, which flows 181.1 metres below the summit at a survey point between Schierke and Elend (514.4 m above NN).

== Walking and viewing points ==
The Barenberg can only be reached on forest tracks and hiking trails, for example from Schierke or Elend.

About 450 metres south-southeast of the summit lies the viewing point called the Aussichtskanzel am Barenberg ("Observation pulpit on the Barenberg") ca. 620 m above NN; 51°45′1.15″N 10°40′30.96″E), which i s checkpoint no. 20 in the Harzer Wandernadel hiking system and, for example, can be reached on a steep descent from the summit. From the viewing point the view ranges over Schierke, the Elend valley, Elend itself, the Erdbeerkopf and the Hohnekamm on the far side and the Hohneklippen tor. A castle, the Elendsburg, once stood in the Elend valley east of the viewing point.
