= Scherstorklippen =

Cliff in Schierke, Germany

Coordinates: 51°45′0.65″N 10°39′25.45″E

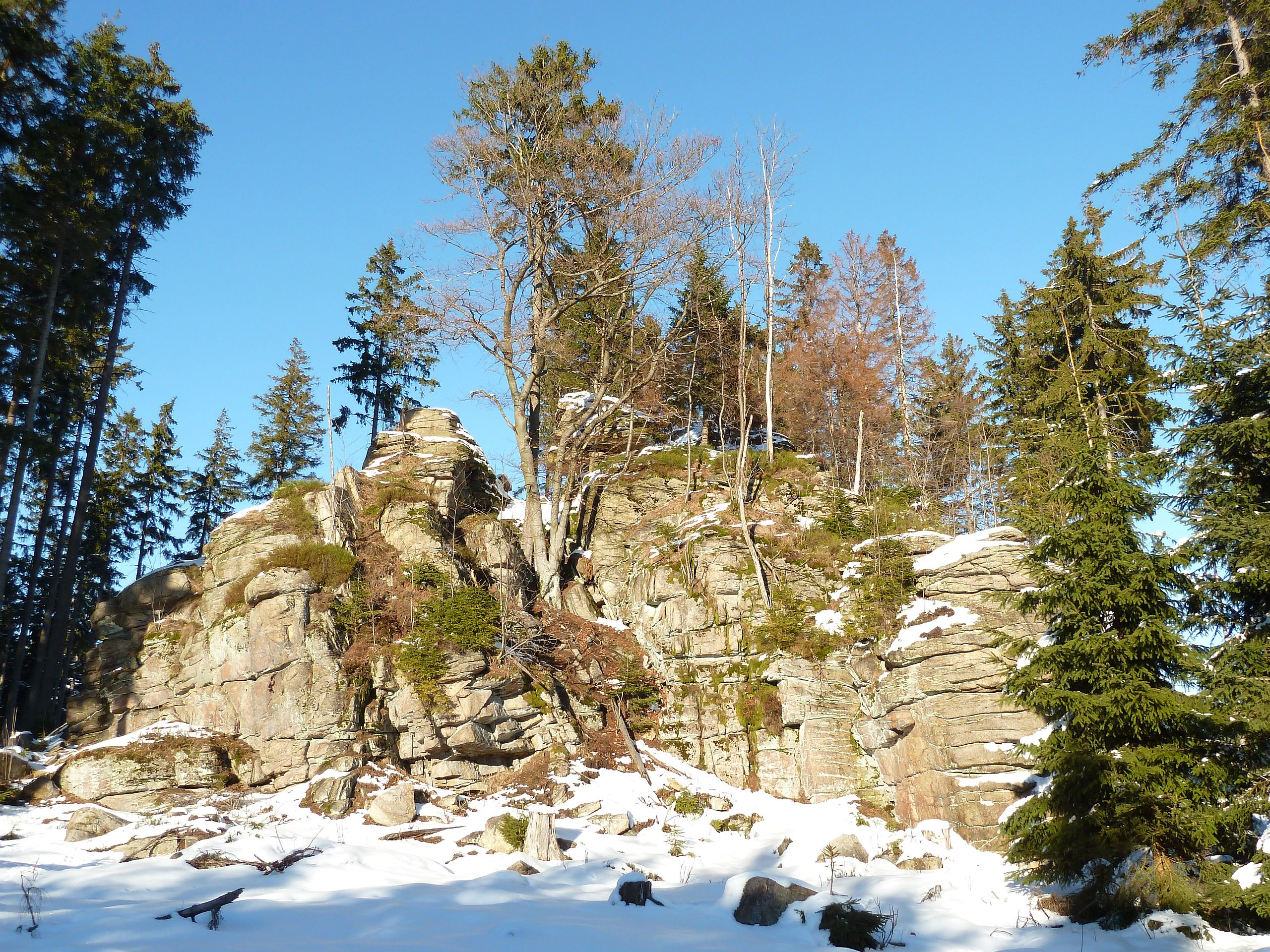
Southwest side of the Scherstorklippen

The Scherstorklippen is a granite tor (up to 694 m above sea level (NN)) in the Harz Mountains of central Germany. It is located near the village of Schierke in the county of Harz in the state of Saxony-Anhalt. It was formed by the process of spheroidal weathering.

== Location ==
The Scherstorklippen is in the Upper Harz (High Harz) within the Harz/Saxony-Anhalt Nature Park. It lies in a forested region around 1.6 km south-southwest of Schierke, about 2 km west-northwest of Elend, circa 1 km west-southwest of the summit of the Barenberg (695.5 m above NN) and some 2.2 km east-southeast of the mountain group of the Wurmberg, Großer Winterberg and Kleiner Winterberg on the Lower Saxon border. In the vicinity and roughly to the northeast are neighbouring tors of the Mäuseklippe and the Schnarcherklippen.

== Walking and climbing ==
The Scherstorklippen may be reached on forest tracks and footpaths. The trail branching off to the north from the B 27 federal road about 1.5 km west of Elend is also suitable for cyclists. The more difficult trail from Schierke to the crags, also known as the Gelber Weg, runs past the Mäuseklippe, and the Schnarcherklippen is about 1 km away from this route.

== See also ==
- Harzklippen
