= Kleiner Winterberg (Harz) =

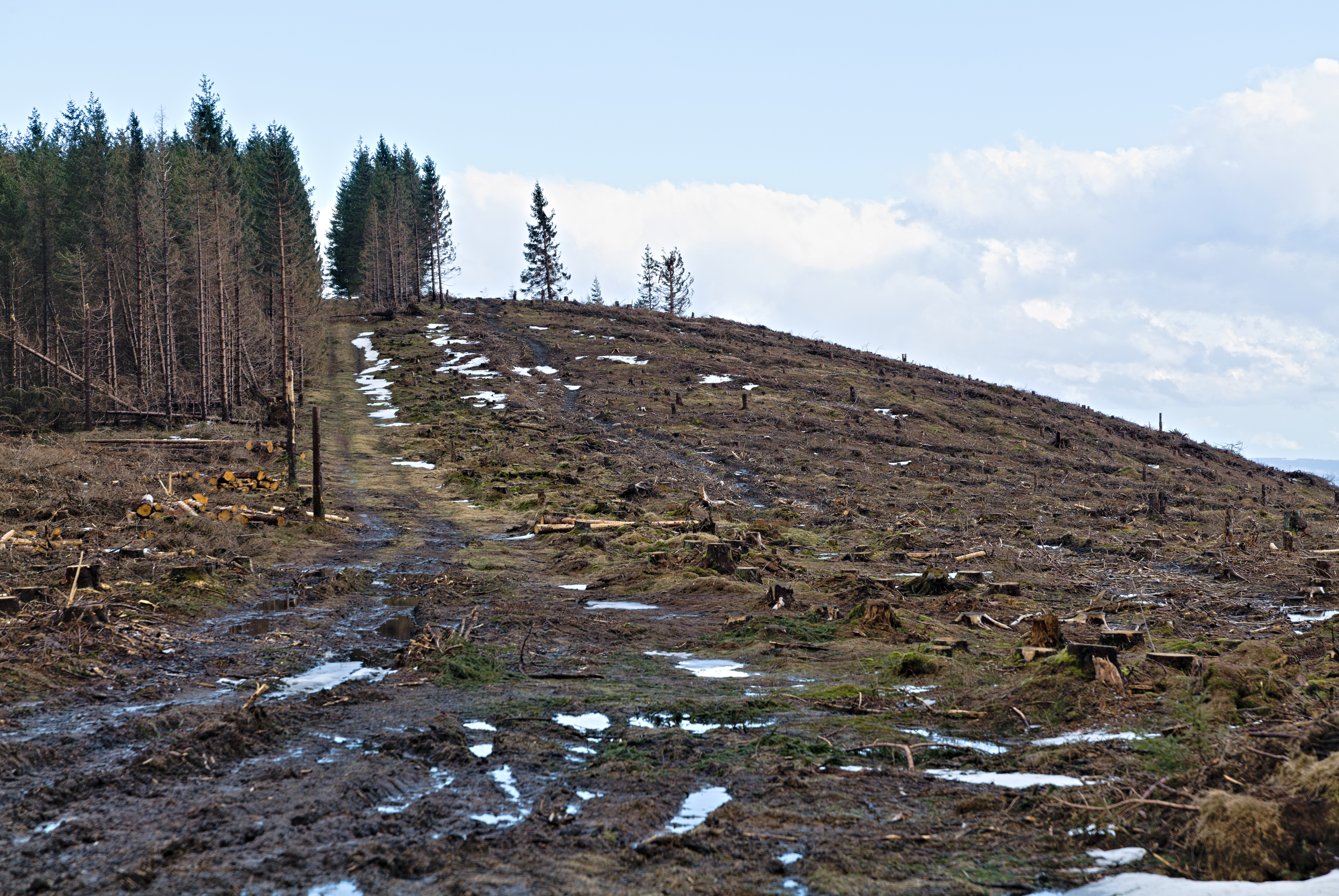
- Kleiner Winterberg (2022)

Highest point
- Elevation: 837 m above sea level (NN) (2,746.1 ft)
- Coordinates: 51°45′21″N 10°38′05″E

Geography
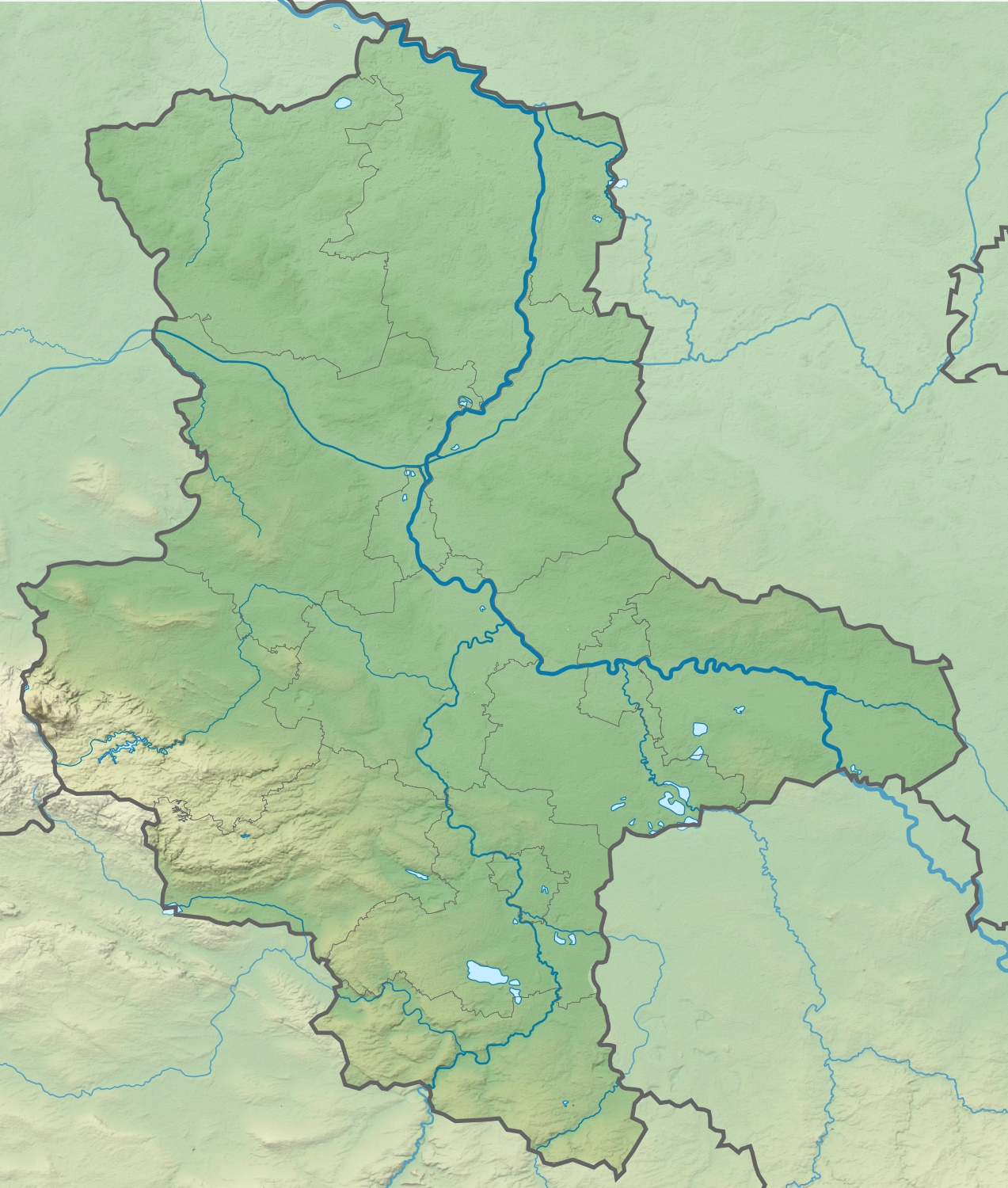
- Location within Saxony-Anhalt
- Location: Harz county, Saxony-Anhalt, Germany
- Parent range: Harz Mountains (High Harz)

The Kleiner Winterberg is a mountain, 837 m above sea level (NN), in the borough of Wernigerode, Harz county, in the German state of Saxony-Anhalt. It is found in the Harz Mountains and is a subpeak of the Wurmberg, the highest point in the neighbouring state of Lower Saxony.

== Location ==
The Kleiner Winterberg lies within the Harz/Saxony-Anhalt Nature Park just east of the border with Lower Saxony and about 2.2 km southwest of the village of Schierke in the borough of Wernigerode. To the northeast, on the other side of Schierke on the Cold Bode, rises the ridge of Hohnekamm (900.6 m; with its tors, the Hohneklippen). Towards the southeast the countryside descends to the Barenberg (695.5 m), to the south it drops into the valley of the Bremke stream, which rises on the mountainside to the west on the Wurmberg (971.2 m). To the northwest is the Großer Winterberg (906.4 m) and, beyond that, to the Brocken (1,141.1 m).

== Winter sports area ==
As part of the planning for the Wurmberg 2015 concept, a ski lift or gondola lift and four new downhill runs are to be built in the area between the Großer and Kleiner Winterberg and the Wurmberg towards the village of Schierke.
