= Wurmberg Gondola Lift =

Coordinates: 51°44′40″N 10°37′03″E

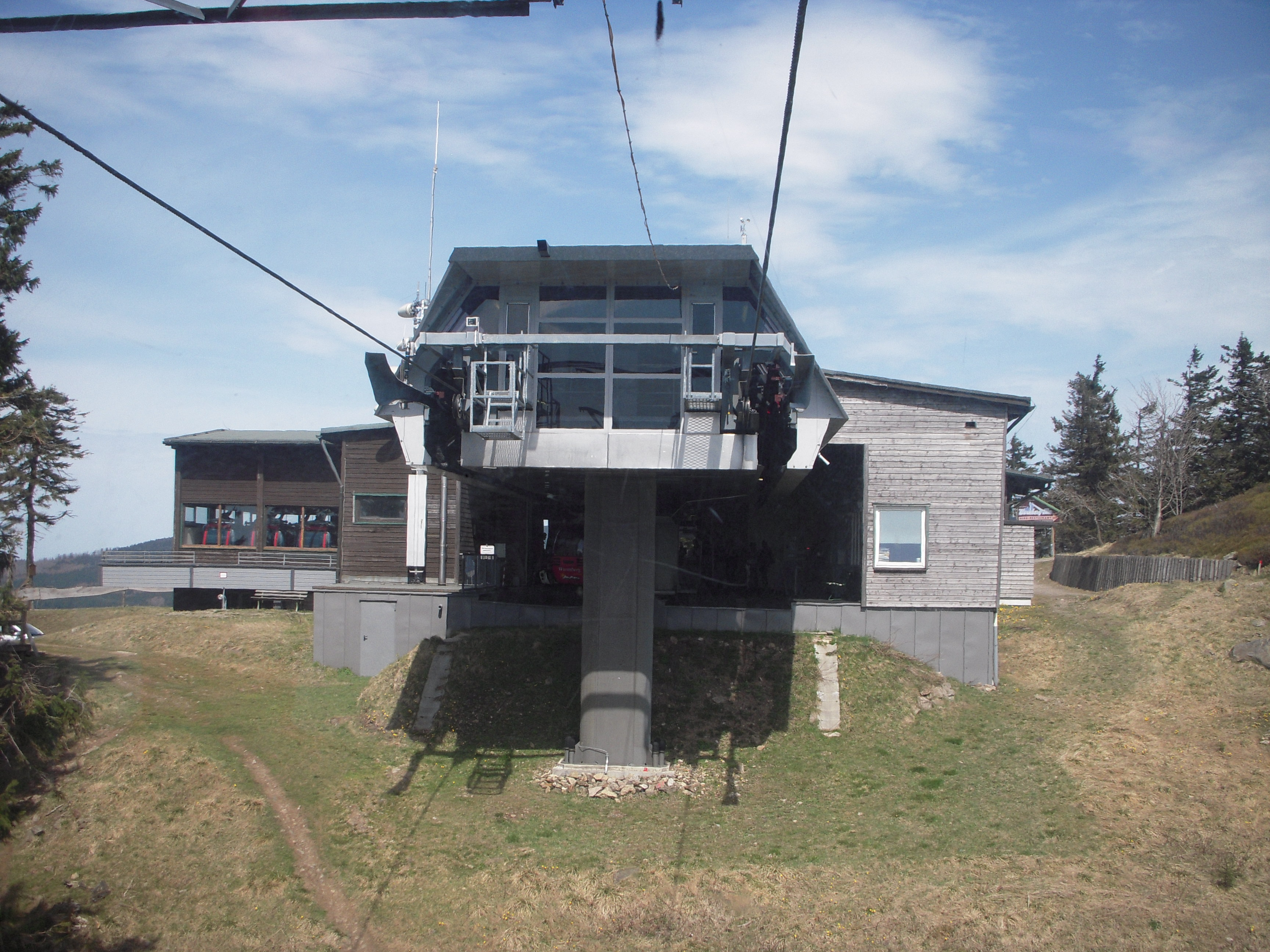
Top station

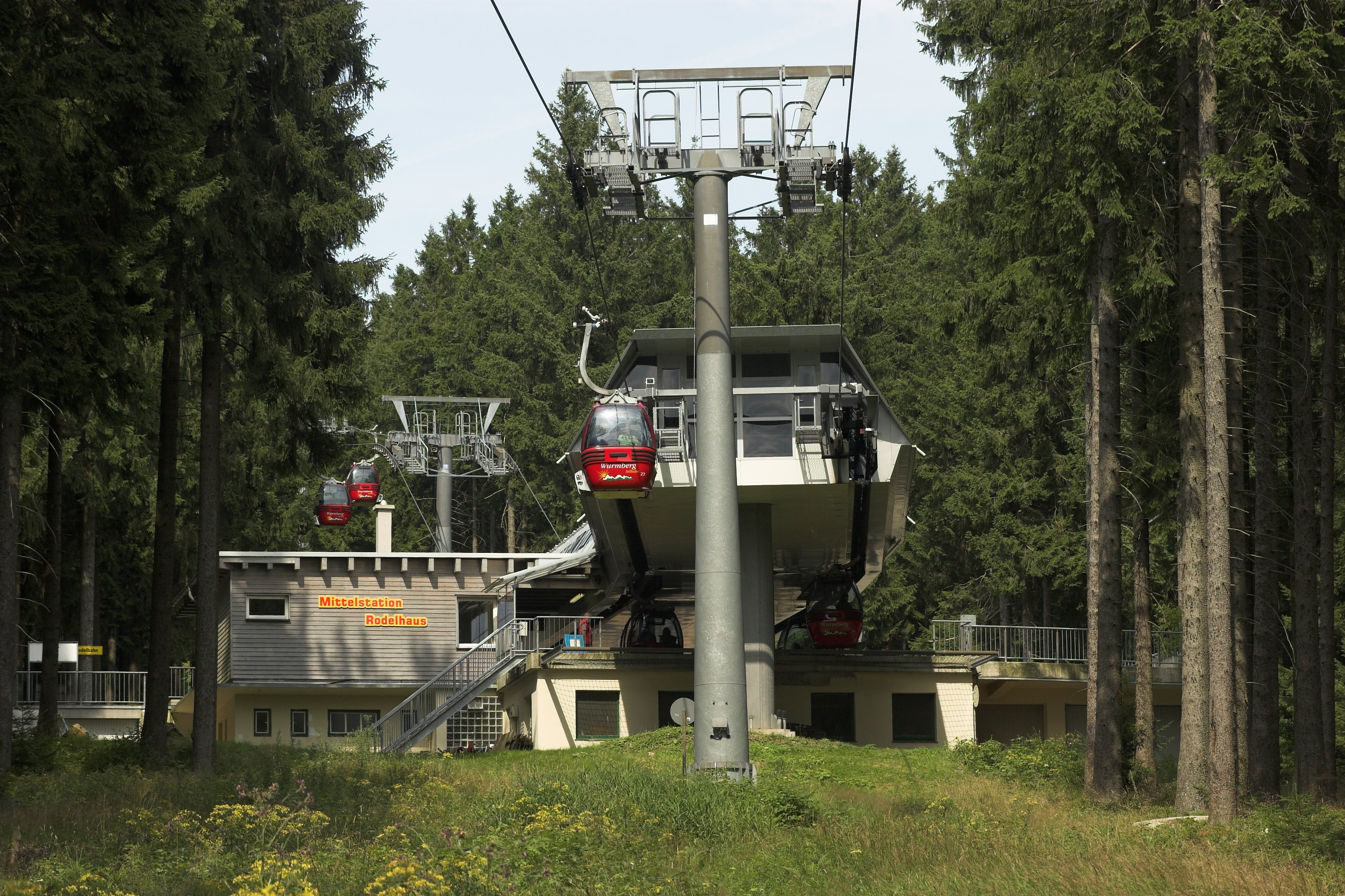
Central station

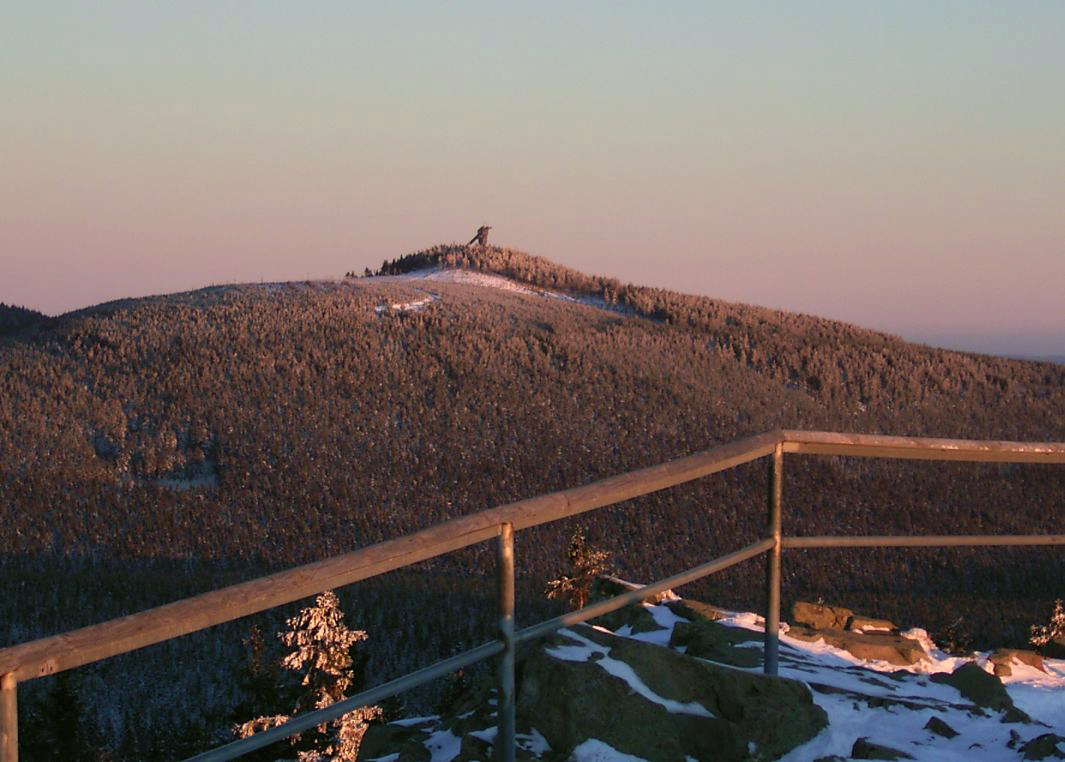
Wurmberg with Wurmberg ski-jump next to the summit station

The Wurmberg Gondola Lift (German: Wurmbergseilbahn) is a monocable gondola lift with a length of 1.7 miles (2.7 km), built in 1963, leading from the Braunlage tourist resort within the Harz mountain range on the top of the 3,185 feet (971 m) high Wurmberg mountain.

The lift is considered as the longest in Northern Germany, with a vertical height of 1,312 feet (400 m). It does not soar high above the trees, in contrast to the nearby Bode Valley Gondola Lift and differs from other lifts in that it has a central station, which one can ride through without disembarking.

The Wurmberg is the highest mountain of Lower Saxony and the second highest in the Harz after the Brocken. It offers a ski jump and a wide range of skiing and snow-boarding slopes.

== Route ==
The Valley Station of the lift is situated in a large car park north of the High Harz town of Braunlage. Passengers may board and alight at the Middle Station where there are walks to the Rodelhaus inn, the Wurmbergklippen crags, the Kaffeehorst (checkpoint 18 in the Harzer Wandernadel) and Elend/Schierke, the Wurmberg Quarry (ca. 500 m), the Bärenbrücke bridge over the Warme Bode, and Königskrug. The Top Station is located a few metres below the summit plateau which has seen much change in recent years. In the immediate vicinity of the Top Station is the piste on the northern slope of the Wurmberg with its various lifts.

The Wurmberg Ski Jump on the summit plateau may be visited; there is a restaurant inside. As well as the jump, there are open views of Schierke in the valley of the Kalte Bode as well as the summit of the Brocken (1141 m). During the summer there are downhill mountain bike courses and bike hire available. From the gondolas there are good views of Braunlage most of the way.
