= Trudenstein =

Rock formation in Germany

Coordinates: 51°46′20″N 10°41′48″E

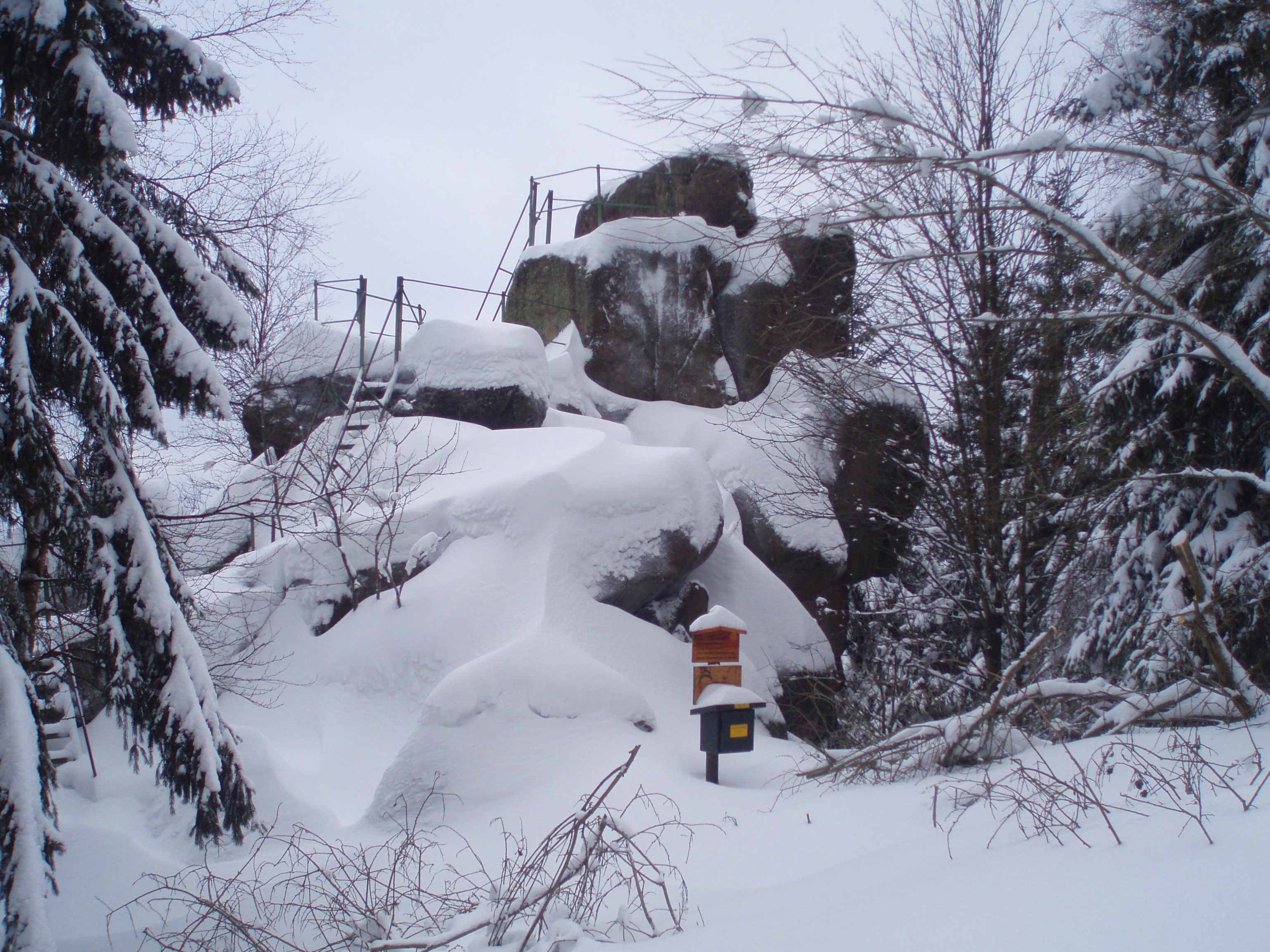
The Trudenstein rocks in winter

The Trudenstein is a rock formation and popular hiker's destination in the Harz Mountains of central Germany. It is located in the federal state of Saxony-Anhalt.

== Location and surrounding area ==
The Trudenstein lies beside the Glashütten Way on the wooded southern slopes of the Hohnekopf ridge about two kilometres northeast of the village of Schierke in the Harz National Park. Two kilometres to the east, is the village of Drei Annen Hohne that, like Schierke, is part of the borough of Wernigerode. The Brocken Railway, an important heritage line, runs past the rocks immediately to the south, below a granite quarry.

The rocks of the Trudenstein are composed of granite and their summit lies at an elevation of 671 m.

== Tourism ==
The Trudenstein is a popular hiking destination that is easily reached from Drei Annen Hohne on marked trails. The summit of the rock formation has been made accessible to the general public using ladders. From the top there is a commanding view of large parts of the East and South Harz. In good weather, the nearby Wurmberg mountain, the villages of Schierke and Elend, and the Stöberhai mountain, 15 kilometres away, may be seen.

The Trudenstein is No. 17 in the system of checkpoints that form the Harzer Wandernadel hiking network.

== History ==
The name Trudenstein is derived from the appearance of the rocks which is supposed to resemble a drude, an old German, witch-like figure associated with dreams. In 1783 Johann Wolfgang von Goethe walked past the Trudenstein during one of his visits to the Harz and, in 1811, Caspar David Friedrich drew a sketch of the rocks. They are also said to have inspired the group of rocks in the foreground of his painting, Der Watzmann.

Ladders were first erected on the summit of the Trudenstein in 1894.

== See also ==
- Harzklippen
