= Großer Winterberg (Harz) =

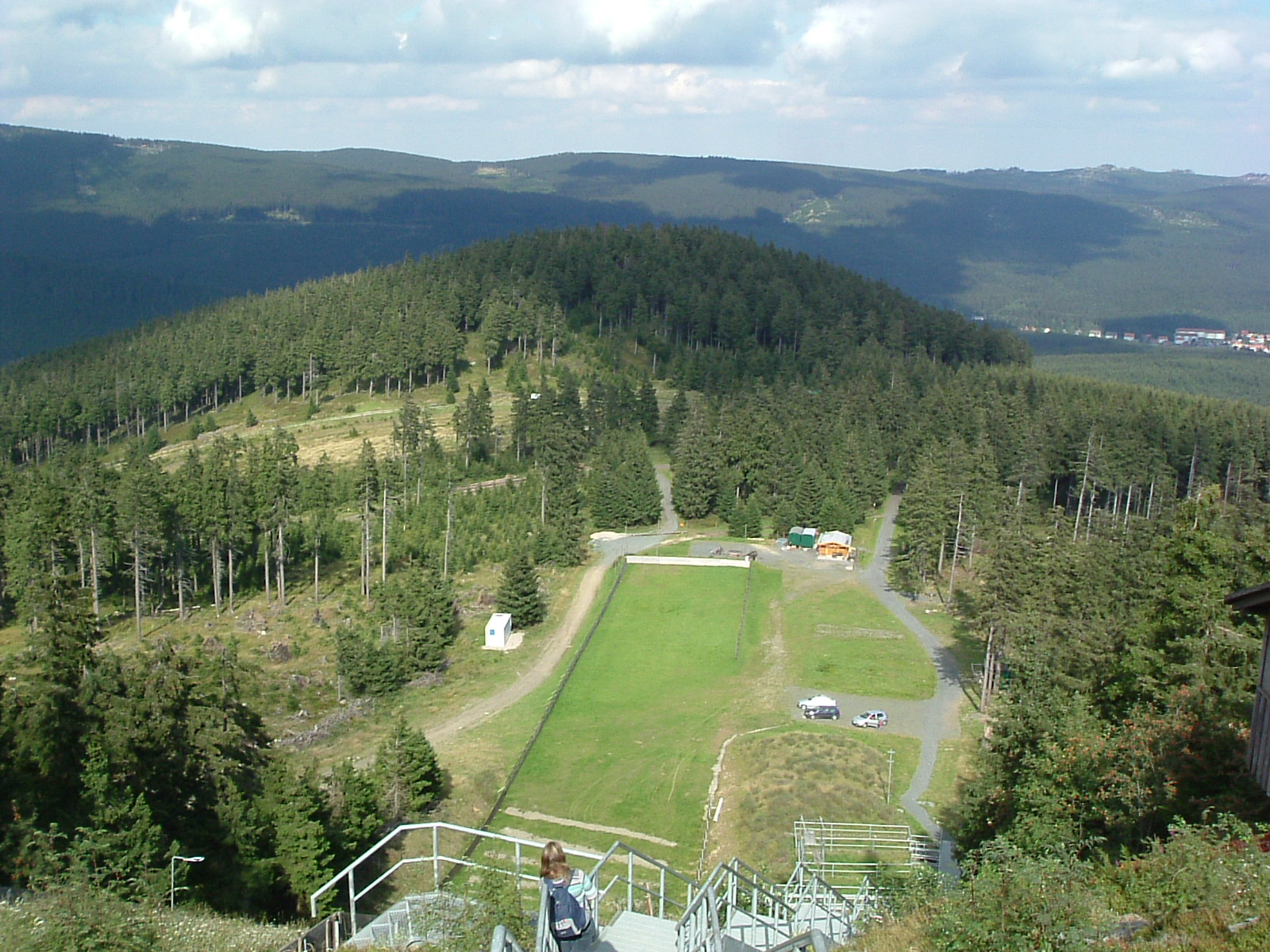
- View over the foot of the Wurmberg Ski Jump to the Großer Winterberg; the treeless strip to the left indicates the course of the former Inner German Border. Right: outskirts of Schierke with the Hohnekamm ridge behind

Highest point
- Elevation: 906.4 m above sea level (NN) (2,974 ft)
- Coordinates: 51°45′38″N 10°37′29″E

Geography
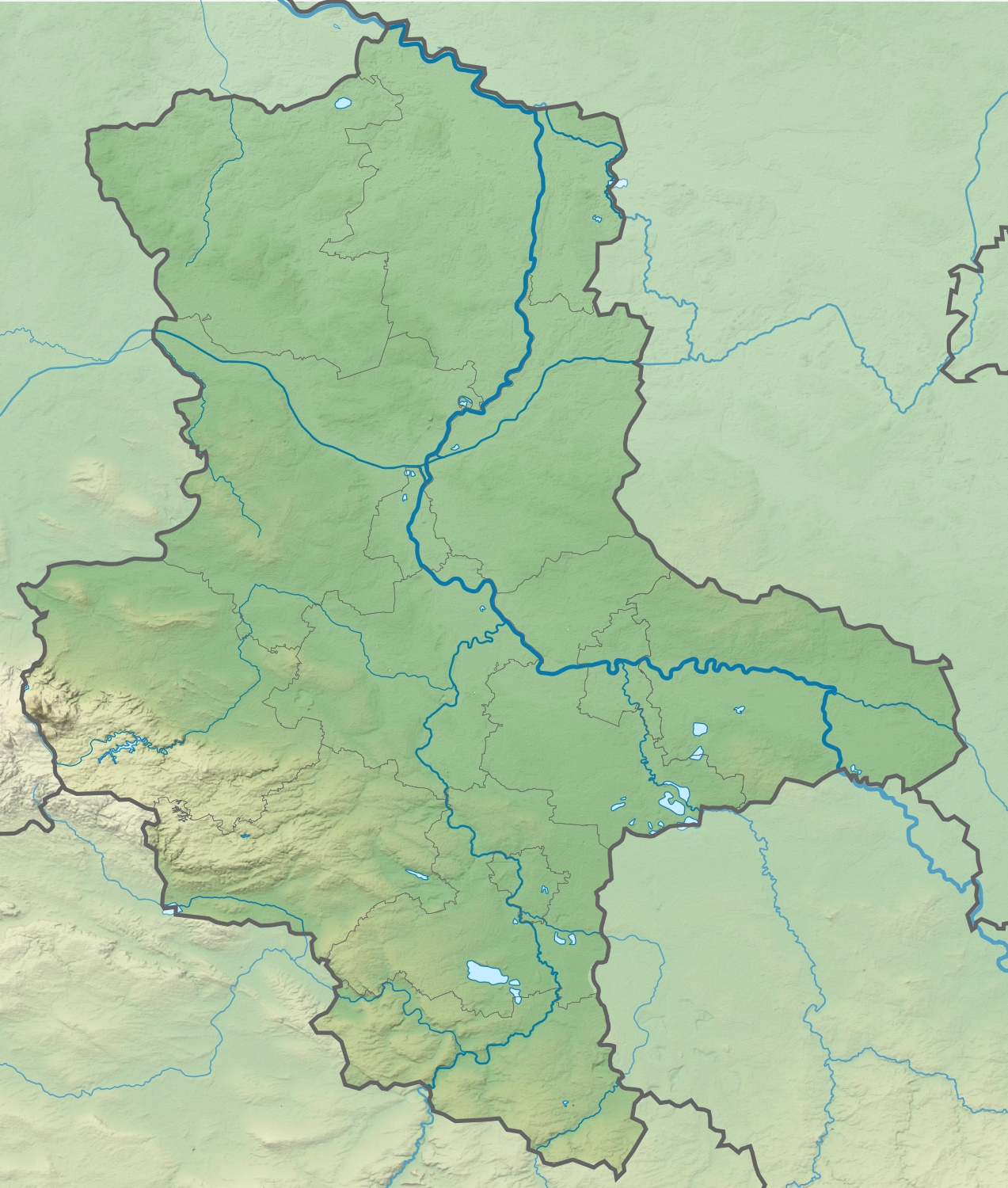
- Location within Saxony-Anhalt
- Location: Harz, Saxony-Anhalt, Germany (Part of the Harz National Park)
- Parent range: Harz (High Harz)

The Großer Winterberg ("Great Winterberg") is a mountain, 906.4 m above sea level (NN), and a subpeak of the Wurmberg, the highest mountain in the neighbouring state of Lower Saxony in the High Harz of central Germany. The Großer Winterberg rises within the borough of Wernigerode in the county of Harz in the state of Saxony-Anhalt.

== Location ==
The Großer Winterberg lies within the Harz/Saxony-Anhalt Nature Park and the Harz National Park immediately northeast of the state border with Lower Saxony and about 2.5 km west-southwest of the village of Schierke in the borough of Wernigerode. To the north-northwest the countryside descends into the valley of the Cold Bode, on the other side of which rises the legendary Brocken (1,141.1 m), in front of which are the Königsberg (1,033.5 m) to the west and the Heinrichshöhe (ca. 1,045 m) to the east. From northeast to east-northeast, above Schierke on the other side of Cold Bode rises the ridge of Hohnekamm (900.6 m; with its tors, the Hohneklippen). To the southeast is the Kleiner Winterberg ("Little Winterberg", 837.0 m). To the southwest the countryside climbs gradually over the state border up to the Wurmberg.

== Winter sports resort ==
As part of the Wurmberg 2015 project a ski lift or gondola lift and four new downhill runs are planned, running down from the region between the mountains of Großer and Kleiner Winterberg and the Wurmberg towards Schierke.
