= Schnarcherklippen =

Coordinates: 51°45′16″N 10°39′59″E

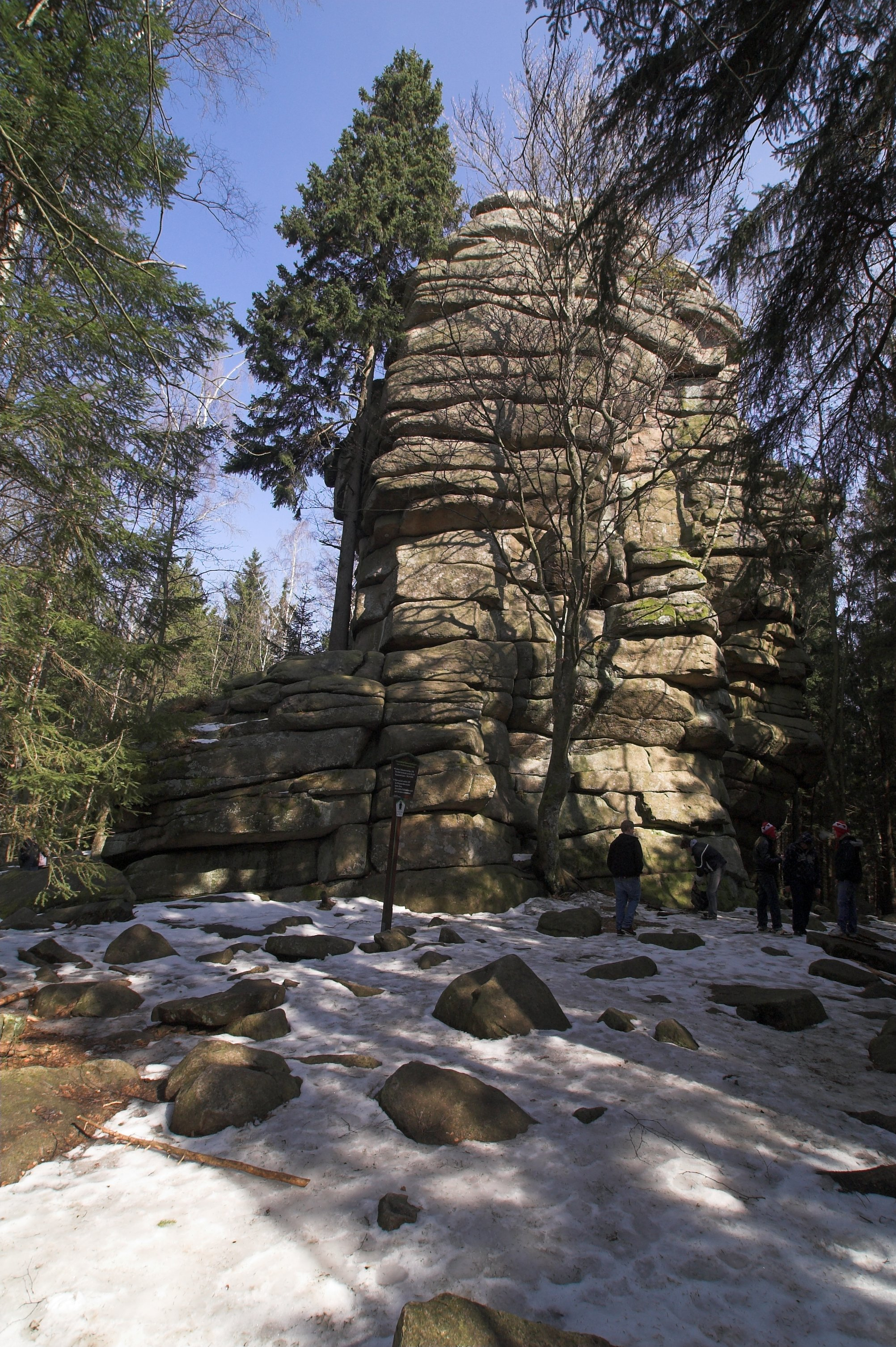
The northeastern ...

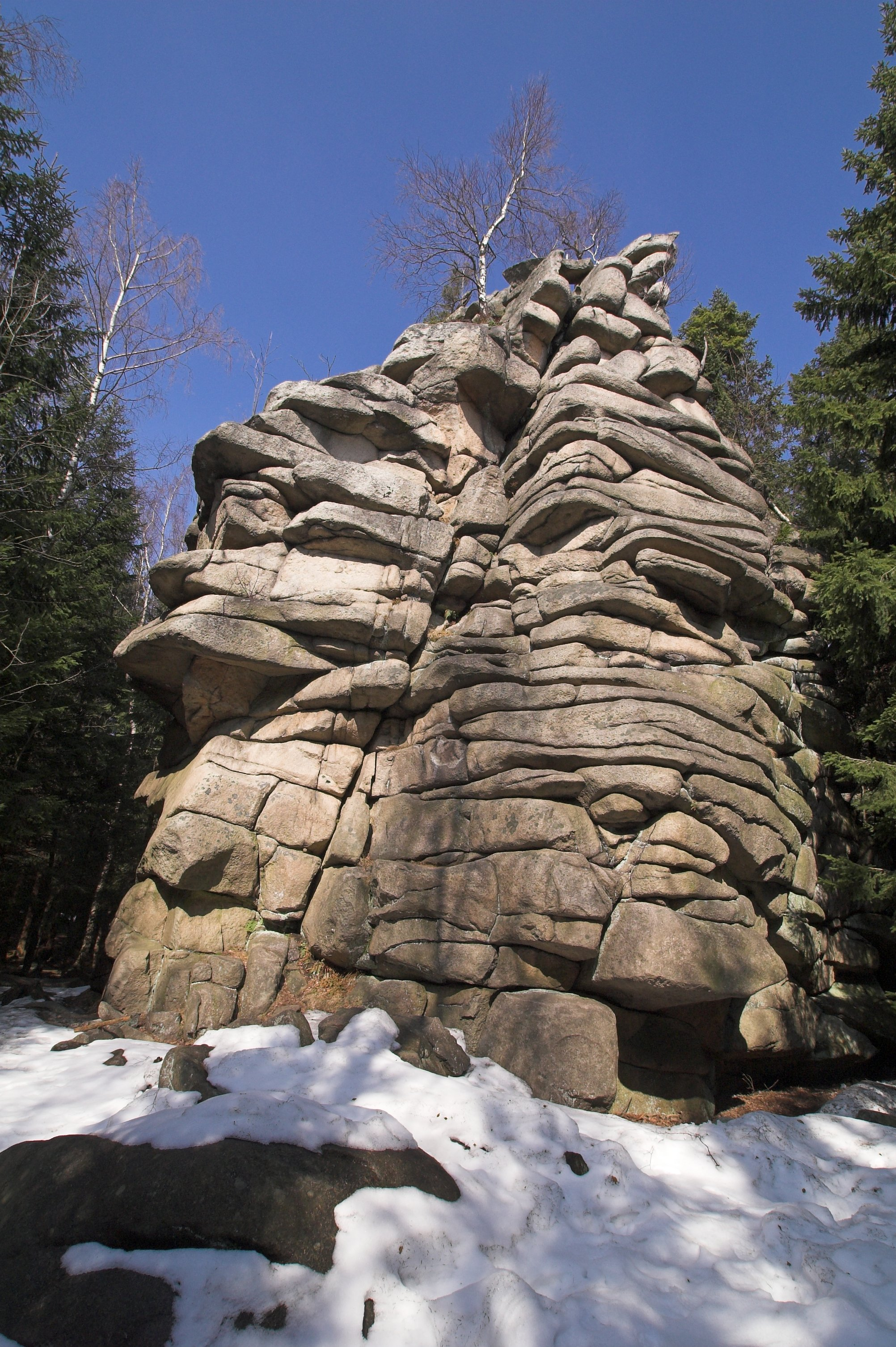
... and southwestern pinnacles

Schnarcherklippen is the name of a rock formation (up to 671 m above sea level) south of the village of Schierke in the High Harz mountains of Saxony-Anhalt in central Germany. The name translates roughly to "snoring crags" or "snoring rocks".

== Geology ==
The two rock pinnacles, which stand about 20 metres (66 ft) apart and are some 25 metres (82 ft) high, are part of the granite massif of the Brocken and are a clear example of spheroidal weathering" (Wollsackverwitterung). Another feature of the Schnarcherklippen is that they deflect compass needles away from magnetic north due to the presence of magnetite in the rock.

== Access ==
The shortest way to the Schnarcherklippen rocks is by footpath from the Schierke. From the top of the rocks there is a view over the whole of the surrounding area, including the Bärenkopf, the holiday resort of Schierke, the Erdbeerkopf, the Brocken massif and the Wurmberg. The Schnarcherklippen are checkpoint no. 14 in the Harzer Wandernadel hiking trail network.

== Climbing ==
The northeastern pinnacle may be ascended using an iron ladder, but the southwestern rocks are only accessible to climbers. There are various climbing routes of grades I to VIIIb (Saxon grading) on the southwestern rocks and from IV to IXc on the northeastern rocks.

== Name ==
When the wind blows from the southeast the rocks make a strange sound which was the inspiration for its name (schnarchen = "snoring").

== Goethe and the crags ==
On his third journey to the Harz in September 1784 Johann Wolfgang von Goethe visited the Schnarcherklippen. They are mentioned in the Walpurgis Night scene of Faust I and in Faust II:

Faust I

Seh die Bäume hinter Bäumen,
wie sie schnell vorüberrücken,
und die Klippen, die sich bücken,
und die langen Felsennasen,
wie sie schnarchen, wie sie blasen!

See them swiftly changing places,
Trees on trees beside us trooping,
And the crags above us stooping,
And the rocky snouts, outgrowing,—
Hear them snoring, hear them blowing!

Faust II

Der Blocksberg bleibt ein gar bequem Lokal,
Wo man auch sei, man findet sich zumal.
Frau Ilse wacht für uns auf ihrem Stein,
Auf seiner Höh wird Heinrich munter sein,
Die Schnarcher schnauzen zwar das Elend an,
Doch alles ist für tausend Jahr getan.

The Blocksberg's a convenient place to roam;
Wherever you are, you find yourself at home.
Dame Ilsa watches for us on her Stone,
Wakeful is Henry on his lofty Throne;
The Snorers snort, in truth, in Elend's ears,
But all remains unchanged a thousand years.

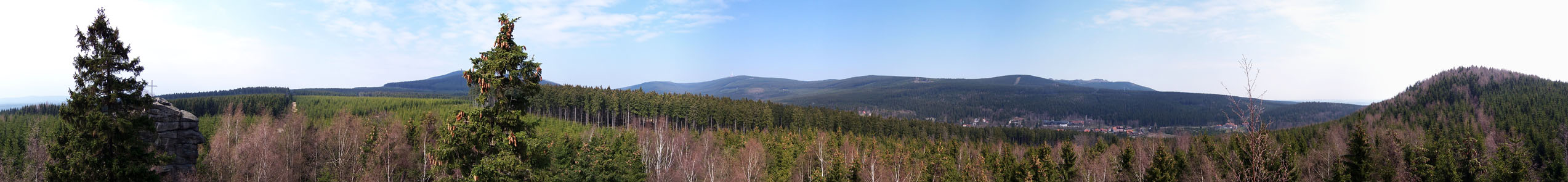
Panoramic view from the Schnarcherklippen

== See also ==
- List of rock formations in the Harz
