= Hohnekamm =

Mountain ridge in Central Germany

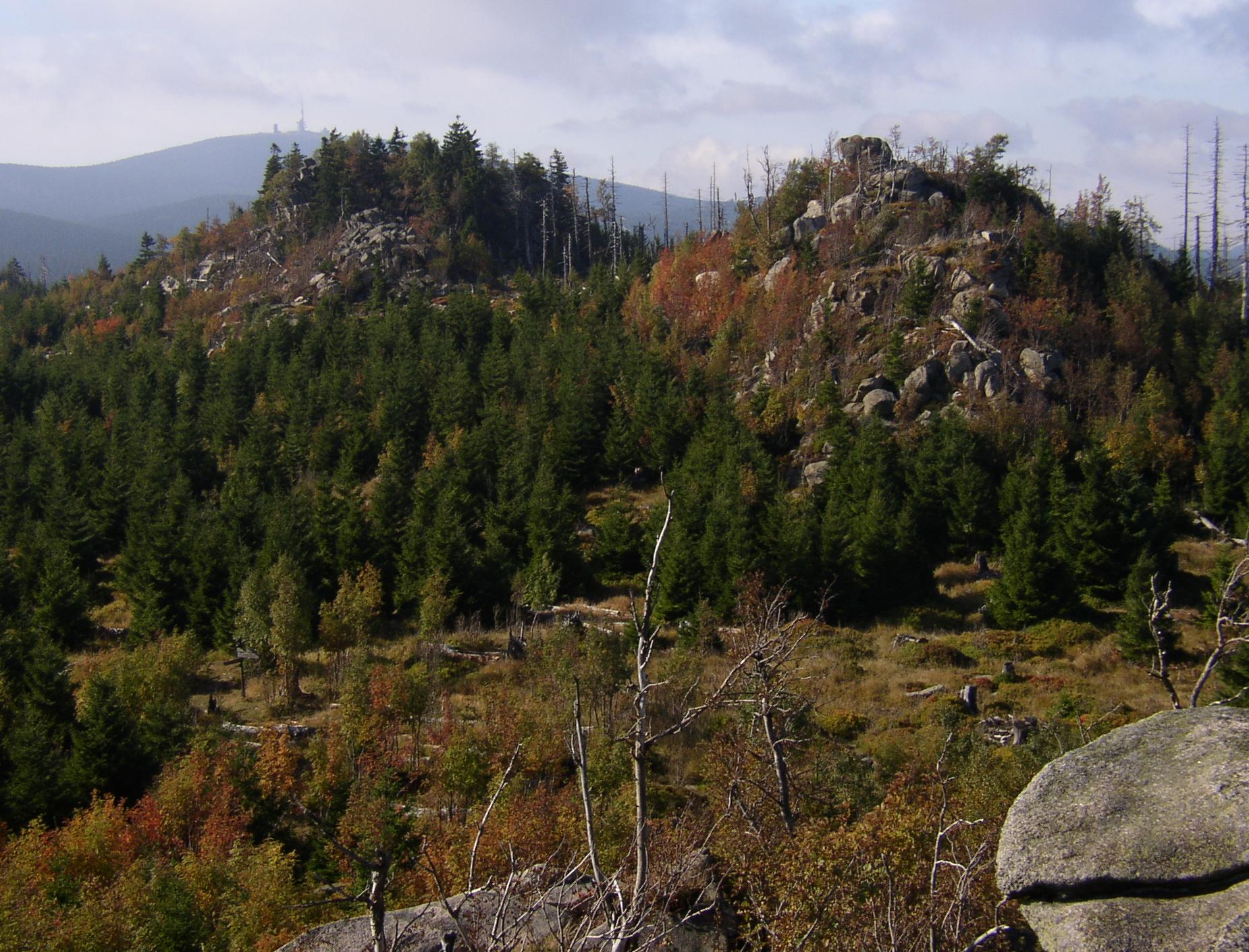
- View from the Leistenklippe to the Grenzklippe, with the Brocken in the background

Highest point
- Elevation: 900 m above sea level (3,000 ft)
- Coordinates: 51°46′53″N 10°41′53″E

Geography
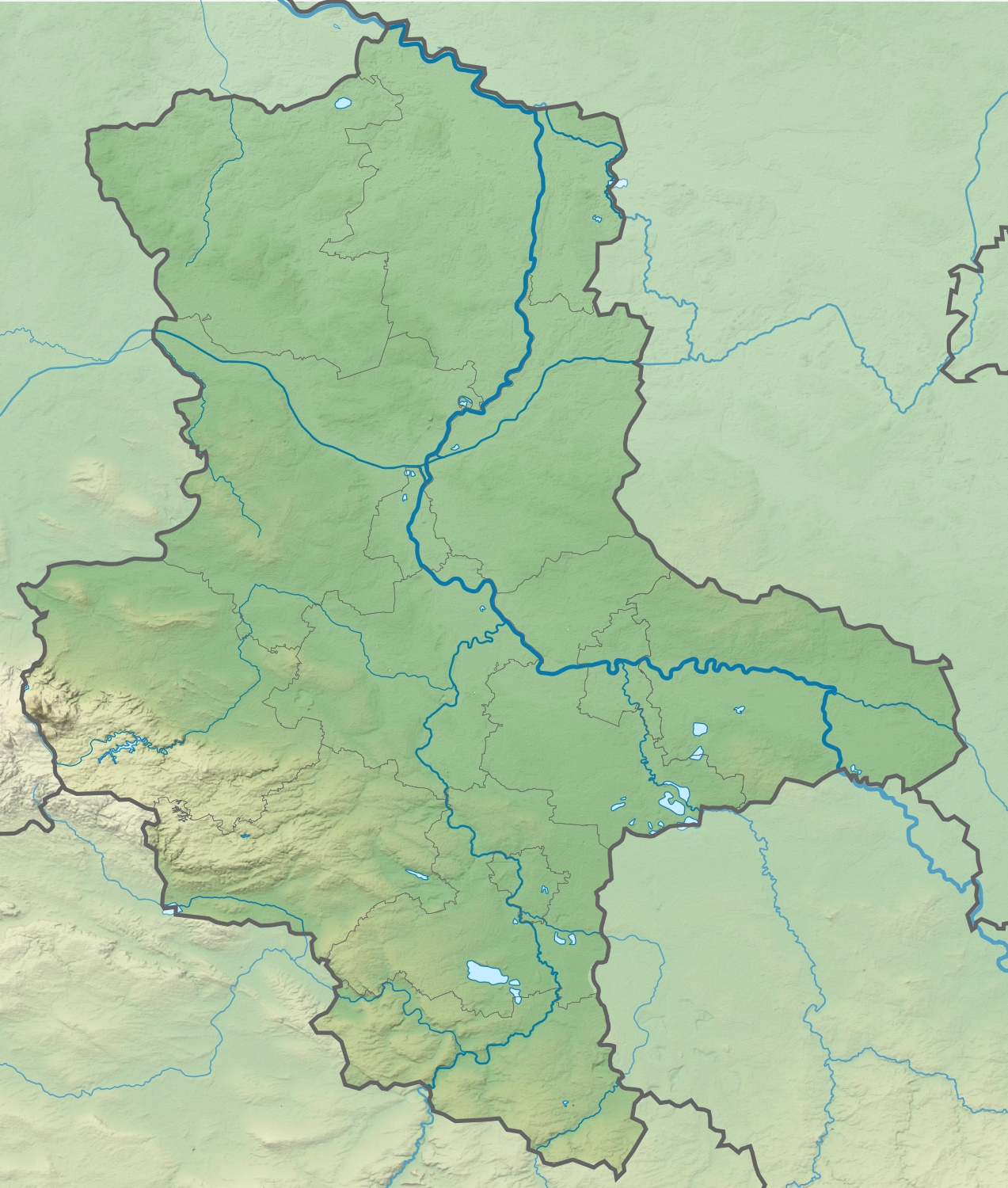
- Location within Saxony-Anhalt
- Location: Saxony-Anhalt, Germany
- Parent range: Harz

Geology
- Rock type: Granite

The Hohnekamm or Hohne Kamm is a mountain ridge up to 900 m above sea level high in the Harz mountains of central Germany. It is located in the state of Saxony-Anhalt, and is well known for its rock towers or tors, the Hohneklippen.

== Location and surrounding area ==
The wooded Hohnekamm lies within the Harz Nature Park in Saxony-Anhalt and within the Harz National Park. It lies around 2 km northeast of Schierke, a village on the Kalte Bode river and runs for about 3 kilometres in a northwest-to-southeast direction. The largest town in the area is Wernigerode, 5 km to the northeast. To the east is Elbingerode. Drei Annen Hohne, 2 km southeast of the mountain, is the start of the Brocken Railway, a narrow gauge line, that runs along the southern slopes of the Hohneklippen westwards towards the Brocken. The Hohnekamm forms the watershed between the Holtemme to the north and the Wormke in the south. The region is part of the Harz National Park.

== The tors ==
The mountain is made of granite, which has formed bizarre tor-like rock formations at several places due to spheroidal weathering, especially the Hohneklippen on the upper slopes. The highest of these rock pinnacles is the 900.6 m above NN high Leistenklippe. West of it is the 886 m above NN high Grenzklippe ("Border Tor"), to the southeast the crest continues on towards the Bärenklippe ("Bear Tor", ca. 870 m above NN). The southeastern section of the Hohneklippen is calle the Hohnekopf (ca. 840 m above NN); from here the ski slopes of Drei Annen Hohne stretch eastwards. Lower down, on its southern slopes, is the Trudenstein, another tor with good views.

According to legend, in the rugged tors of the Hohneklippen were once three young women who were turned to stone here for their pride.

== Brocken Railway ==
The Brocken Railway runs over the southern slopes of the Hohnekamm and past the neighbouring mountain of Erdbeerkopf. The line, 19.0 kilometres long and opened in 1898, is a narrow gauge railway that runs from the junction at Drei Annen Hohne northwest to the Brocken.

== Sport ==
In winter the area is used for cross-country skiing and tobogganing.

The Leistenklippe is checkpoint no. 15 in the Harzer Wandernadel hiking trail network.
