= Kalte Bode =

River in Germany

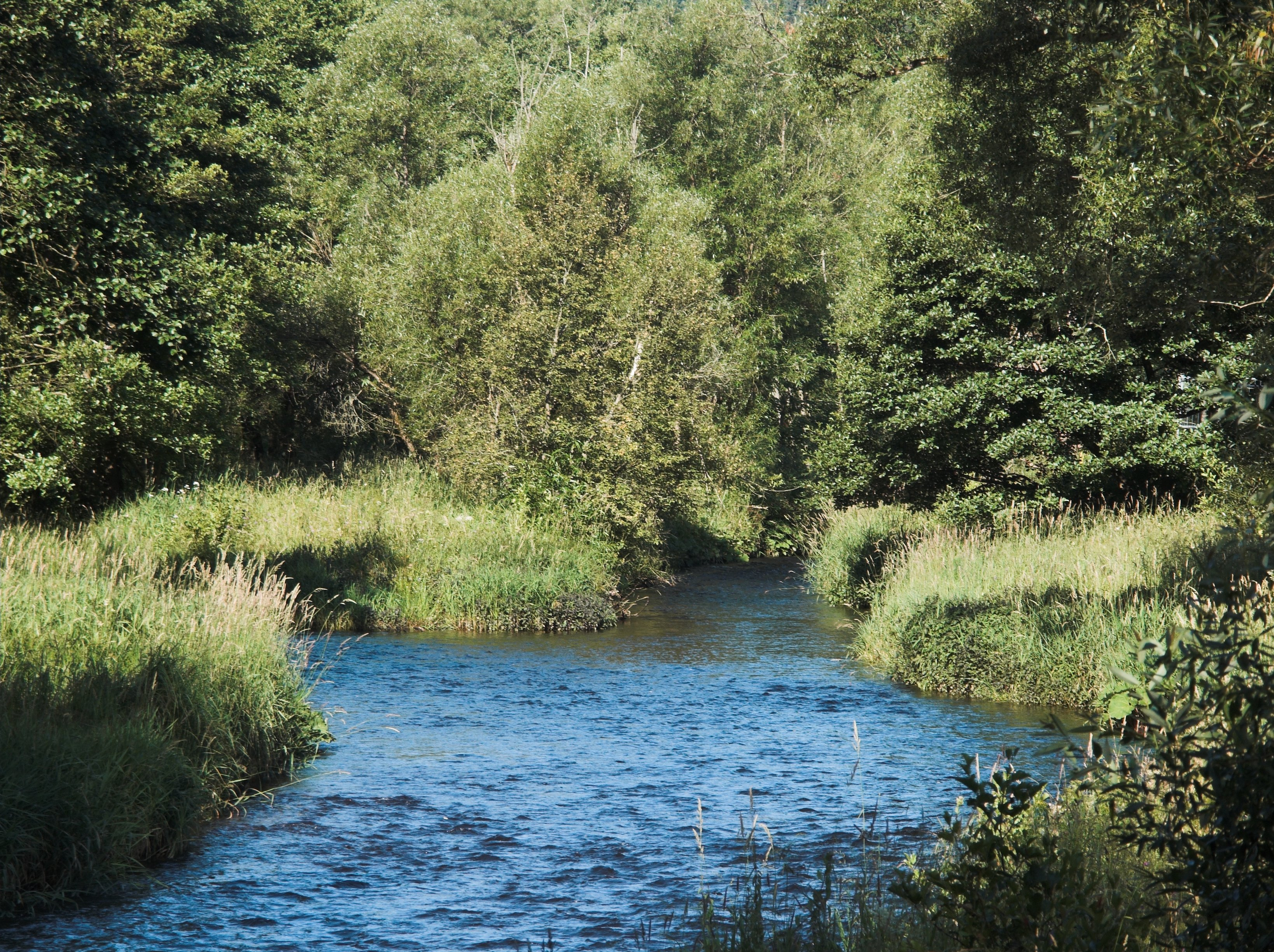
- Confluence of the Warme Bode (left) and the Kalte Bode (right) near Königshütte

Location
- Country: Germany
- State: Saxony-Anhalt

Physical characteristics
- Source
  - location: north of Braunlage
  - coordinates: 51°47′04″N 10°35′05″E
  - elevation: 860 m above sea level (NN)
- Mouth
  - location: confluence: with the Warme Bode to form the Bode, near Königshütte
  - coordinates: 51°44′24″N 10°46′11″E
- Length: 17 km (11 mi)

Basin features
- Progression: Bode→ Saale→ Elbe→ North Sea

The Kalte Bode is the left-hand headstream of the Bode in the High Harz Mountains in the German state of Saxony-Anhalt. It is 17 kilometres (11 mi) long.

== Name ==
The names of the Warme and Kalte Bode ("Warm" and "Cold" Bode) come from their actual temperature difference of about 2 °C.

== Course ==
The Kalte Bode rises in the Upper Harz at the foot of its highest mountain, the legendary Brocken, in the southern part of the so-called Brockenfeld, on the border with Lower Saxony, north of Braunlage. Immediately nearby are the sources of the Warme Bode, the Ecker and the Oder. The Kalte Bode flows initially eastwards to Schierke, along the northern slopes of the Wurmberg. In Schierke it changes direction and heads south.

In the springtime, the Kalte Bode flows at a high volume through the Elendstal, a valley between Schierke and Elend. A few kilometres beyond Elend, it is impounded in the Mandelholz retention basin, before being united with the Warme Bode beyond Königshütte below the ruins of Königsburg to form the Bode.

== Tributaries ==
| Left tributaries | Right tributaries |
| Schwarzes Schluftwasser; Strullicken (Elend); Wormke (Mandelholz); Hirschbach | Sandbeek; Braunes Wasser (Schierke); Kuhbach (Neuehütte) |
In brackets is the location of its confluence with the Kalte Bode.

== See also ==
- List of rivers of Saxony-Anhalt
