= Wurmberg (Harz) =

German mountain

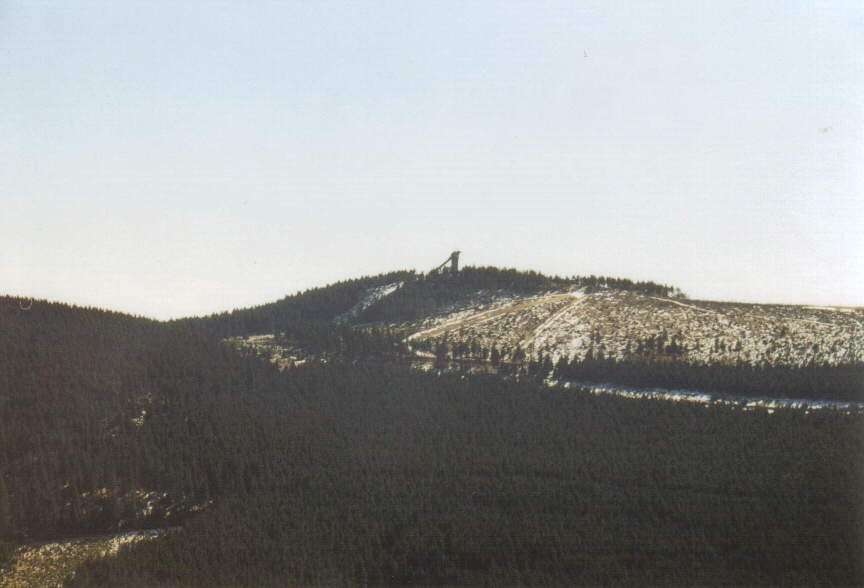
- The Wurmberg with its ski jump

Highest point
- Elevation: 971 m (3,186 ft)
- Prominence: 182 m (597 ft)
- Parent peak: Brocken
- Coordinates: 51°45′24″N 10°37′8″E

Geography
- Location within Lower Saxony
- Location: Lower Saxony, Germany
- Parent range: Harz

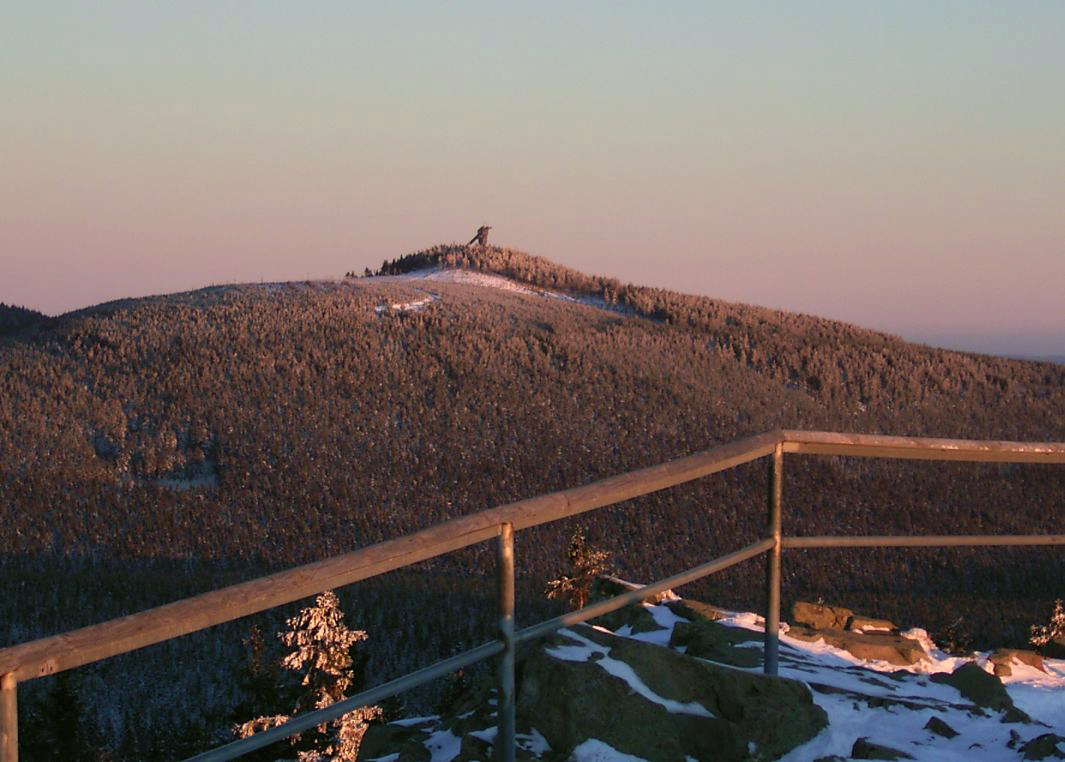
The Wurmberg seen from Achtermann

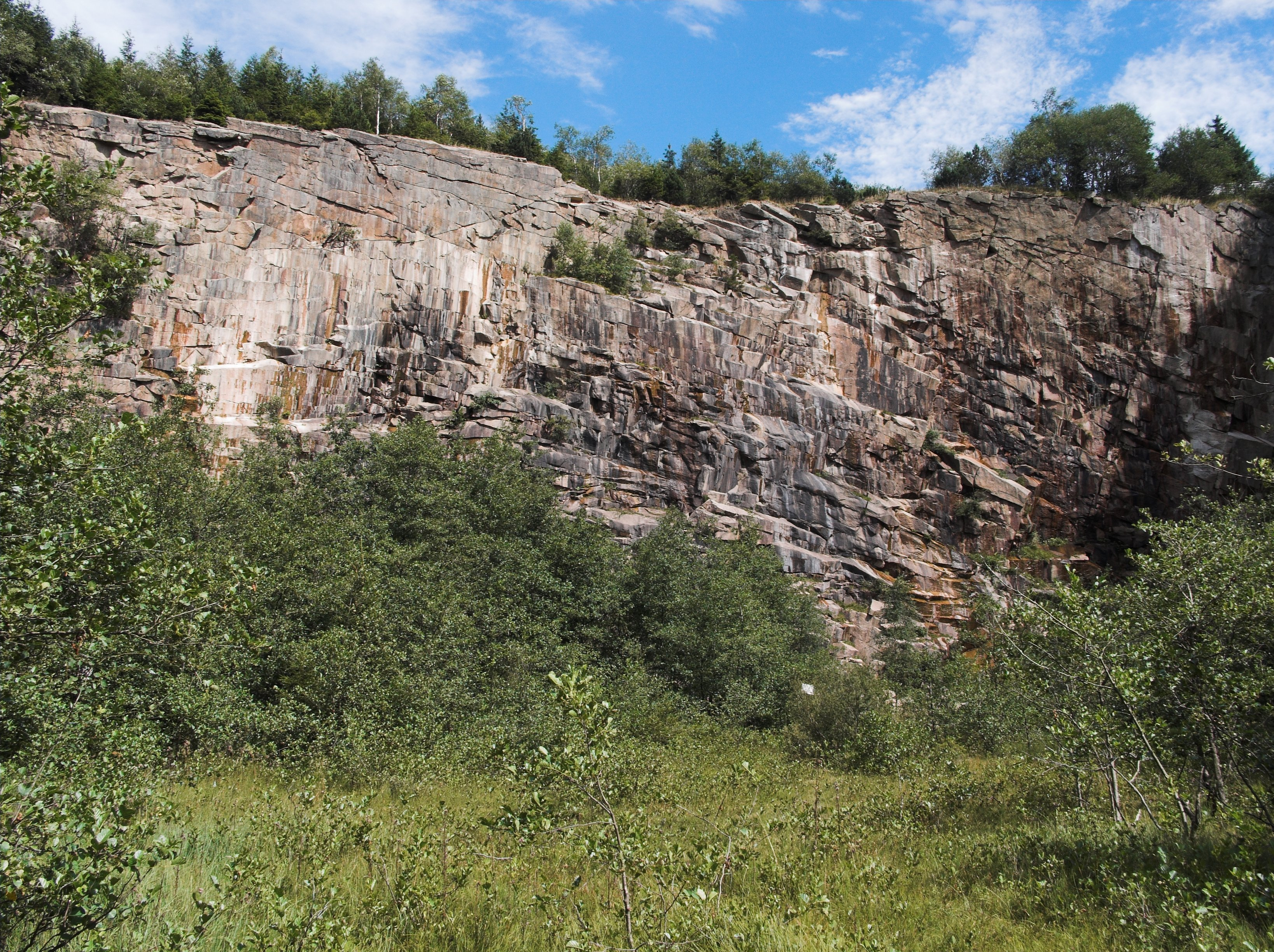
Wurmberg stone quarry

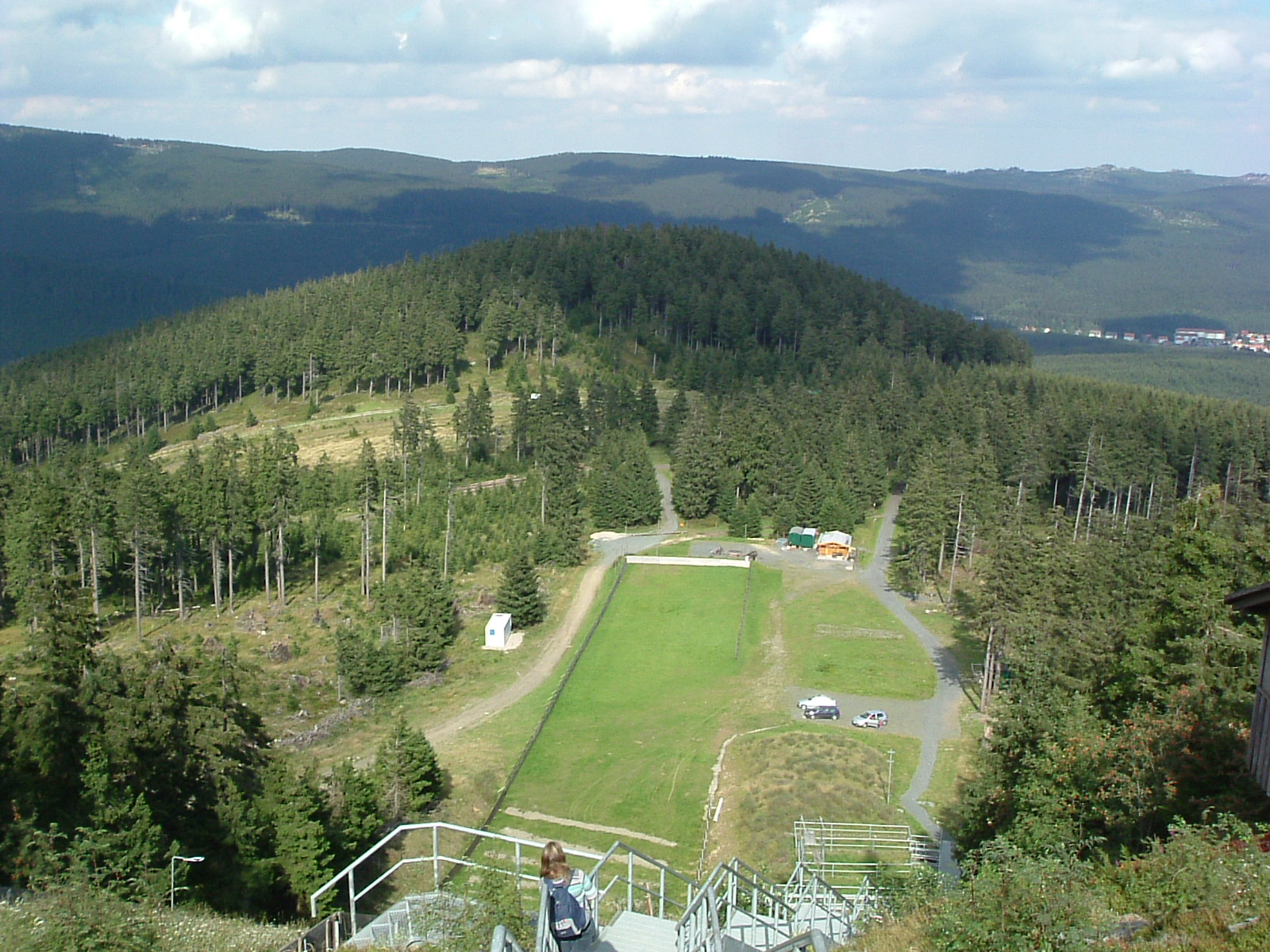
The Wurmberg ski jump in 2006: The treeless strip shows the course of the old Inner German Border; in the background on the right are the outskirts of Schierke

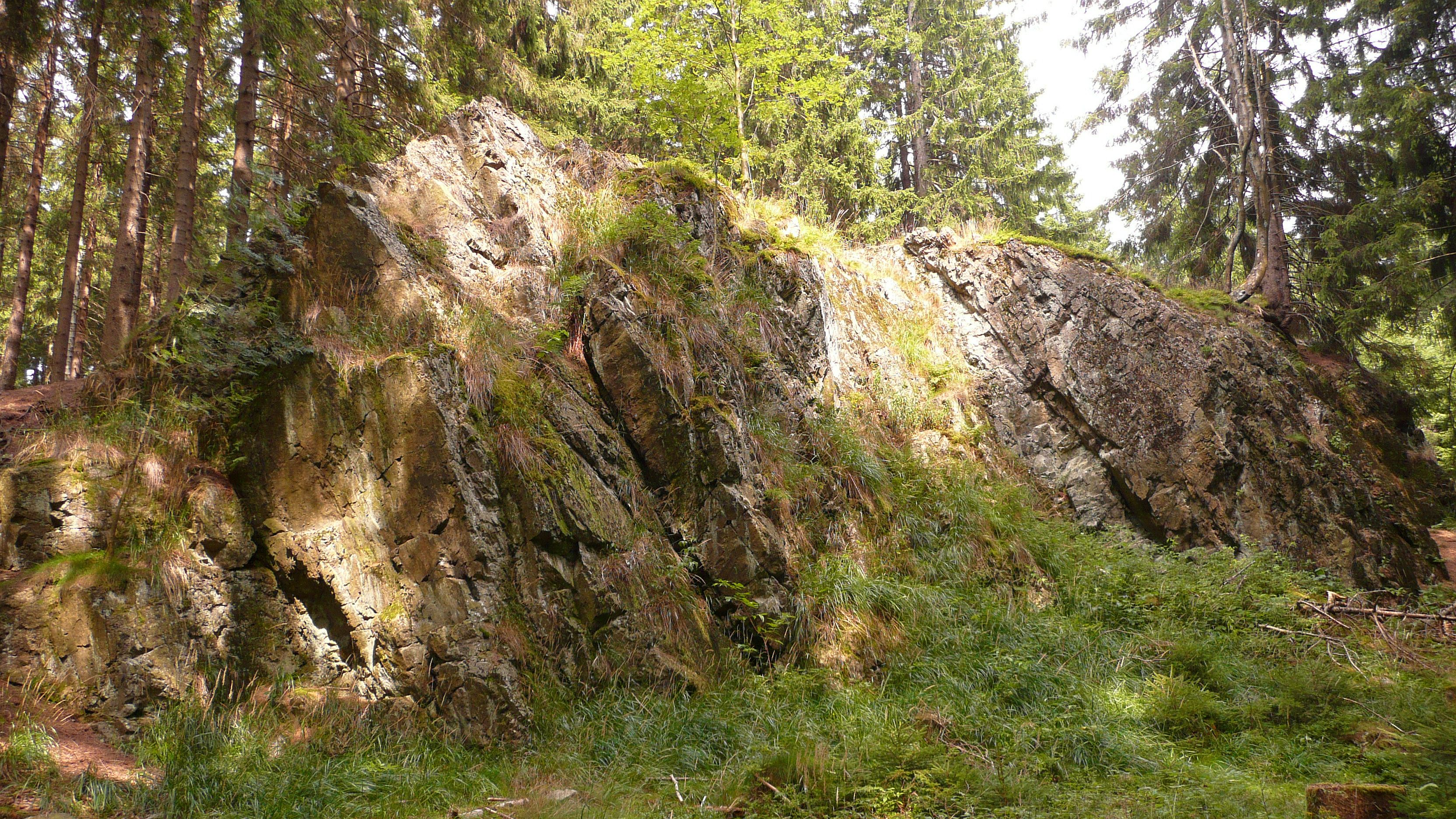
The Kleine Wurmbergklippe near the gondola lift middle station

At 971 m above sea level (NN) the Wurmberg is the second highest mountain in the Harz and the highest in Lower Saxony (Germany).

== Geography ==
The Wurmberg lies north of Braunlage, in the district of Goslar, and west of Schierke. Its summit is located due south of the Brocken and roughly 400 m (as the crow flies) south of the state border with Saxony-Anhalt. The two mountains are separated by the valley of the Kalte Bode, which in this area is about 660 m above NN.

== Wurmberg nature reserve ==
Until October 2006, the Wurmberg lay within the Upper Harz Nature Reserve (Naturschutzgebiet Oberharz). Since then only two areas totalling 183 hectares in area on the west and southwest slopes have been designated as the Wurmberg Nature Reserve.

== Wurmbergklippen ==
On the southern flank of the Wurmberg there are two striking tors or Wurmbergklippen, which are one of the many Harzklippen:

- The Große Wurmbergklippe (also called the Große Klippe; max. 823.8 m), which is designated as a natural monument (ND GS 32), is located within the Wurmberg Nature Reserve about 220 m west of the Wurmberg Gondola Lift route between the top and middle stations, a little above the filled in upper pit of the Wurmberg Quarry.
- The Kleine Wurmbergklippe (or Kleine Klippe; about 690 m) lies between the middle and valley stations of the gondola lift just under 100 m east of the lift route in spruce forest.

On the topmost summit level of the crag there is a triangular offering cup (Opferschale or Zwergenmolle). Many legends, mostly about the "Wild Hunter" (Wilden Jäger) surround this artificially chiselled out rectangular hollow. The Wild Hunter usually epitomises the god Wodin (or Thor) in Germanic mythology.

== History ==
The named Wormberch had already surfaced by the 13th century in the documents and commodity schedules of the County of Regenstein-Blankenburg in connexion with the mining of iron ore. In the 19th century the mountain was still being called Wormsberg or Wormberg, but a convincing derivation of the name has yet to be found.

Around 1850 the first trig post was erected on the summit of the Wurmberg to assist in surveying the Harz mountains. It was replaced in 1890 by a wooden tower, also used for trigonometric measurements, that stood until 1930. In 1922 the wooden ski jump was built with its 28-metre-high (92 ft) starting tower, which also acted as an observation tower (see below). Since the 1950s there has been a restaurant next to this tower. The Inner German Border that separated the West and East Germany during the Cold War, ran only a few hundred metres north and east of the summit.

During the Cold War there was a listening post on the summit plateau. In 1972 the US Secret Services built an 81-metre-high (266 ft) tower, the North Tower on the Wurmberg to monitor and record signals information. This station was demolished on 22 August 1994 and the debris removed. (see also: listening post on the neighbouring Stöberhai).

Since 1963/65 the Wurmberg gondola lift has run from Braunlage up the mountain. The construction of this lift was carried out in two sections; in 1997 the lift was then completely renovated.

In a container on the summit is one of the 25 monitoring sites in the Lower Saxony air quality monitoring network (de:Lufthygienisches Überwachungssystem Niedersachsen).

Since September 2007 a 70 cm amateur radio relay station has also been located on Lower Saxony highest mountain. The relay has the callsign DB0WUR and transmits on 438.550 MHz. This enables large parts of Lower Saxony, Thuringia, Hesse and Saxony-Anhalt to be reached.

=== Historic stone structures ===
The peak of the Wurmberg is covered with a variety of odd stone structures that, for a long time, were interpreted as the remnants of an ancient, pre-Christian place of worship, several millennia old.

A long, straight staircase of unhewn stone begins at a height of about 90 metres above the iron ore mining district on the eastern flank of the mountain and leads to the edge of the summit plateau in a terraced area with edging of similarly unhewn stones. Colloquially this flight of steps is known as the "Heath Staircase" (Heidentreppe), although in earlier times the name "Witch's Staircase" (Hexentreppe) had been common.

In 1856 Heinrich Pröhle reported in his Harz Legends that, continuing in a straight line from the steps, there was a stone path on the plateau leading to a round pile of stones. When he collected his tales of the Upper Harz in 1851 from the inhabitants of Braunlage, they reported that a pagan temple had stood on the site.

Between 1949 and 1956 Walter Nowothnig (1907–1971) carried out several archaeological digs on the Wurmberg. Pröhle's collection of legends reinforced his suspicion that the rumour of these steps being laid by a man called Daubert, a horseman-forester who had lived in Braunlage around 1825, was no longer tenable. Nowothnig's excavations, rediscovered the stone path and also uncovered, at the end of the path, a circular rampart of roughly 10 m diameter which surrounded the ruins of a square stone building. Moreover, south of the path, the foundation of a small circular building was found. In 2006, another, larger rampart was found on the western edge of the summit plateau. Nowothnig found no clues as to the age of the site, which is why it was referred to henceforth as a prehistoric site of worship of unknown period.

Unscientific speculation quickly claimed that the stone structures were a Celtic place of worship. The square building inside the rampart was quickly made out to be a temple, the path seen as a procession route, the stone terraces as a religious theatre and the ruins of the small circular building were referred to as the Hexenaltar ("witch's altar").

From 1999 to 2000 further archaeological investigations on the Wurmberg were carried out under the leadership of Michael Geschwinde and Martin Oppermann. The results of this research largely showed the claims to be wildly exaggerated. The square formation proved to be the foundation of a stone hut built between 1820 and 1840, which master forester Daubert had built. The ruins of this hut and the stone cairn mentioned by Pröhle, were used in 1890 for building the above-mentioned trigonometric tower. The circular site first appeared during the construction of this tower as an abutment for the diagonal posts that supported the tower on all sides. And on one of the stones of the Hexentreppe, an English button from the period around 1800 was found, which finally proved the staircase to be another work by Daubert. Even the large rampart is probably an enclosure laid out by the same forester. In the round Hexenaltar the foundations of the old 1850 trig post were found. Only the age of the stone terraces could not be clarified beyond doubt. Geschwinde's team felt it probable that it was originally a severely eroded, natural, geological formation that had later been artificially reworked.

Nowothnig appears to have been so blinded by his 'legendary' discovery that he did not include in his investigations either the survey tower, that had been demolished twenty years before his excavations, or the trig post, that would have been known to him from Pröhle's report. Forester Daubert and his daughter were known for their 'feasts' on the mountain, and the superstition of Braunlage townsfolk appears to have assumed there were pagan rites behind them. From these tales the legend of the pagan temple emerged after a few decades. Although the notion that there was once a prehistoric religious site on the mountain can be excluded with certainty, in 2003 the Wurmberg plateau was declared an archaeological conservation area on account of the human traces of activity in the Upper Harz in the Early Modern Era.

=== Wurmberg granite quarry ===
The stone quarry on the Wurmberg was established by Herrmann Bachstein as part of the construction of the South Harz Railway around 1899. From 1 September 1899 (until 1958) there was the goods station of Wurmberg at the foot of the mountain on the Brocken path. Rough and dressed stone of Wurmberg granite was loaded onto trains here. From 1925 there was a ballast works at the goods station known as the Knacker.

The Wurmberg loading station was initially linked to the lower bed of the quarry higher up the mountain by means of an inclined railway. Stone was transported down this in hoppers attached by a cable. The embankment on which the tracks of this incline were laid is still clearly visible today along its entire length.

Later an aerial cableway was built on this embankment. The foundations for its pylons may still be seen in the woods today.

In the 1970s the stone quarry was closed. The high stone wall in the lower part of the quarry (now a bird reserve) is still visible. The upper quarry was filled in with spoil that resulted from the construction of the Braunlage ring road (1st construction section).

== Winter sports ==
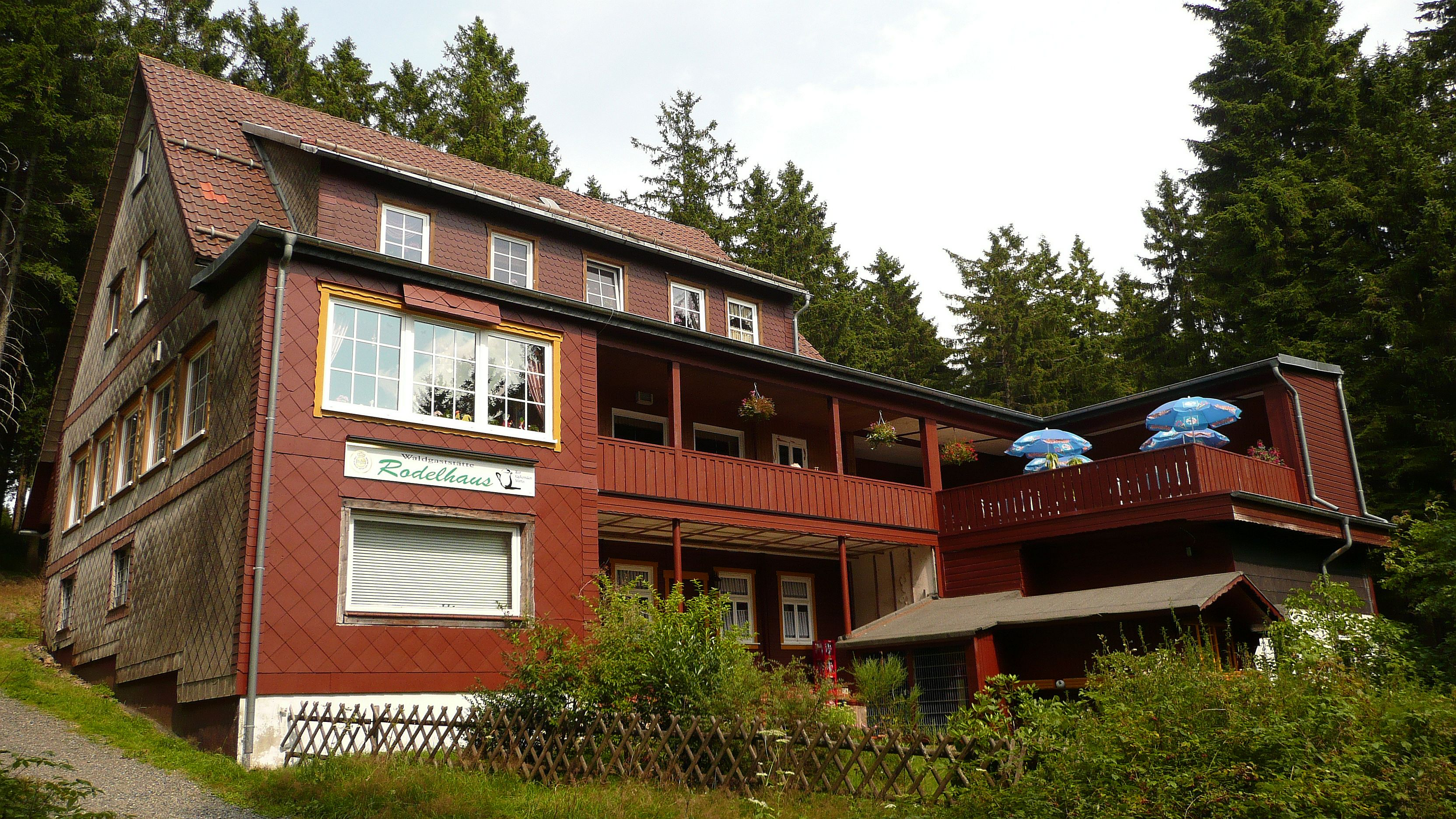
The Rodelhaus near the cableway middle station

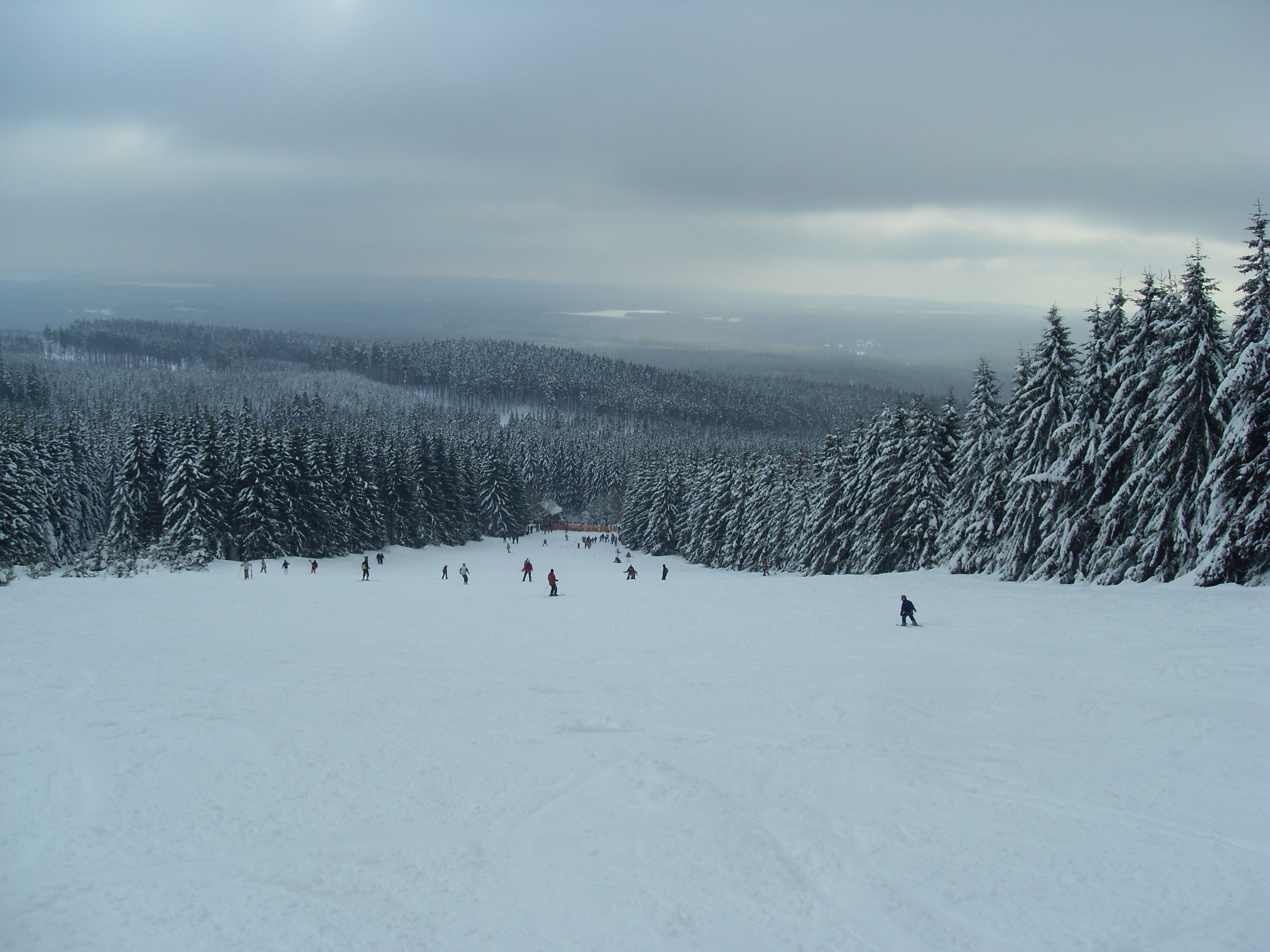
Kaffeehorst run on the Wurmberg

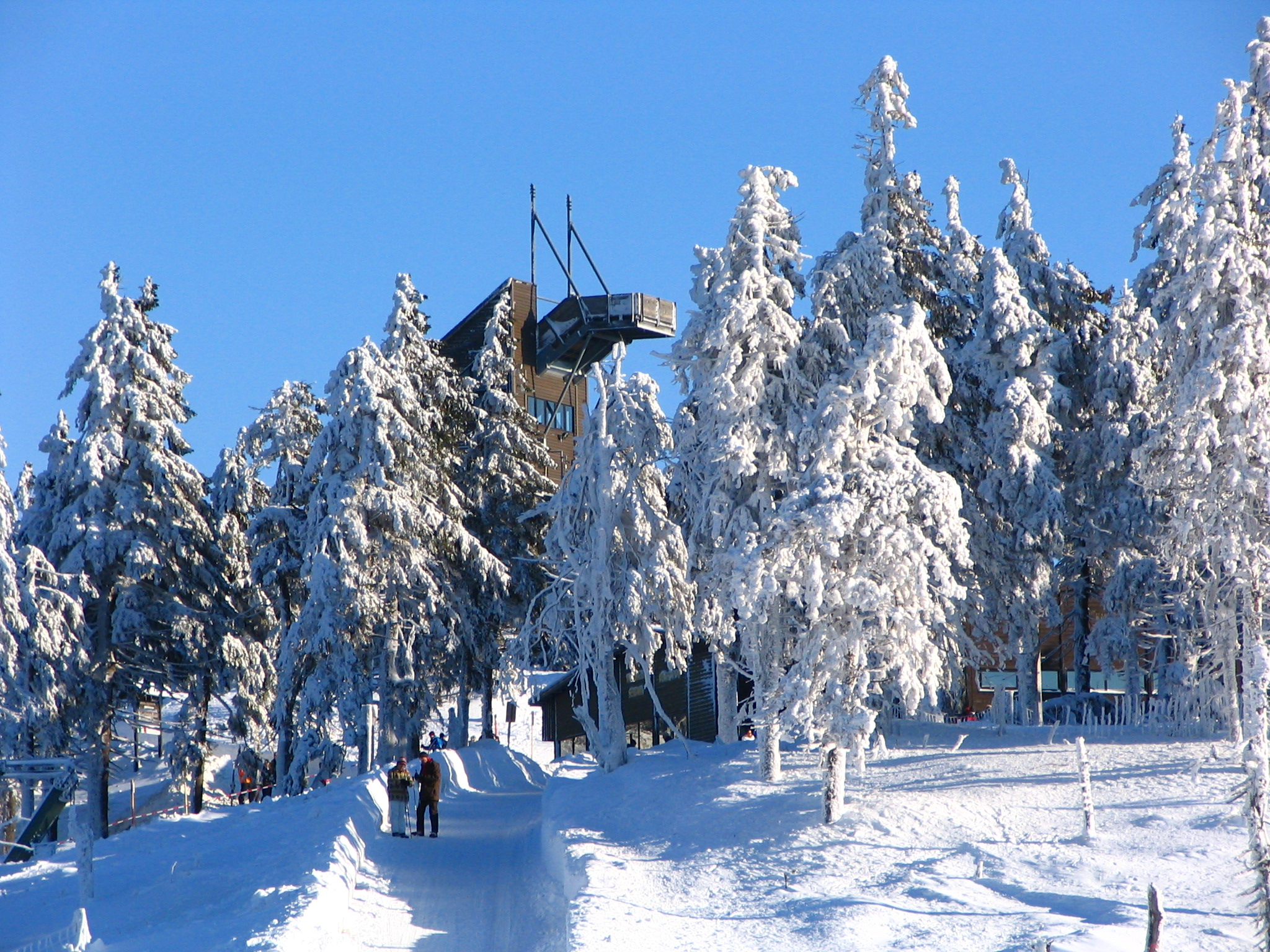
West side of the summit

=== Rodelhaus and toboggan run ===
About halfway up the southern slope of the Wurmberg and 100 m from the middle station of the Wurmberg lift is the Rodelhaus. This used to be a simple farm building before the opening of the toboggan run (Rodelbahn) at the beginning of 1908. It is still open as a restaurant today and is a popular destination for visitors to Braunlage. The 1,500-metre-long (4,900 ft) toboggan run begins immediately next to the Rodelhaus and runs down into the valley ending at the Verlobungswiese meadow near the valley station of the Wurmberg cable car.

=== Downhill skiing ===
There are six downhill ski runs on the Wurmberg with a total length of 12 kilometres. In addition to the Wurmberg Gondola Lift there are three drag lifts, which together have a capacity of 1,700 passengers per hour. The runs are graded from easy to difficult. The longest run is the Sögding with a length of about five kilometres and a height difference of 400 metres.

=== Ski jumps ===
There are several ski jumps on the Wurmberg. See: Wurmberg ski jumps

== Summer sports ==
=== Hiking ===
At the summit restaurant, the Wurmberg Baude is checkpoint no. 156 in the Harzer Wandernadel hiking network.

=== Downhill Mountain Biking ===
During the summer months the Ski lift is used to transport downhill mountainbikes up the mountain for use on the three downhill mountain bike courses scattered through the forest. The courses run from the restaurant at the summit to the car park and bike shop in Braunlage. Tourists can hire Mountain Bikes as well as equipment and buy lift passes from the foot of the Wurmberg in Braunlage.

== See also ==
- List of mountains and hills in Lower Saxony

== Sources ==
- Walter Nowothnig (1956), K. W. Sanerds (ed.), "Der Wurmberg und seine Baureste. Ein Vorbericht über die bisherigen Untersuchungen", Harz-Zeitschrift (in German), vol. 8, Hildesheim
- Heinz-Peter Koch; Michael Geschwinde; Martin Oppermann (2002), Archäologische Kommission für Niedersachsen (ed.), "Die Steinanlagen auf dem Wurmberg bei Braunlage im Harz nach den neuen Untersuchungen 1999 und 2000", Nachrichten aus Niedersachsens Urgeschichte (in German), vol. 71, Stuttgart: Theiss, pp. 151–220, ISSN 0342-1406
