= Schierke =

- Stadtteil of Wernigerode
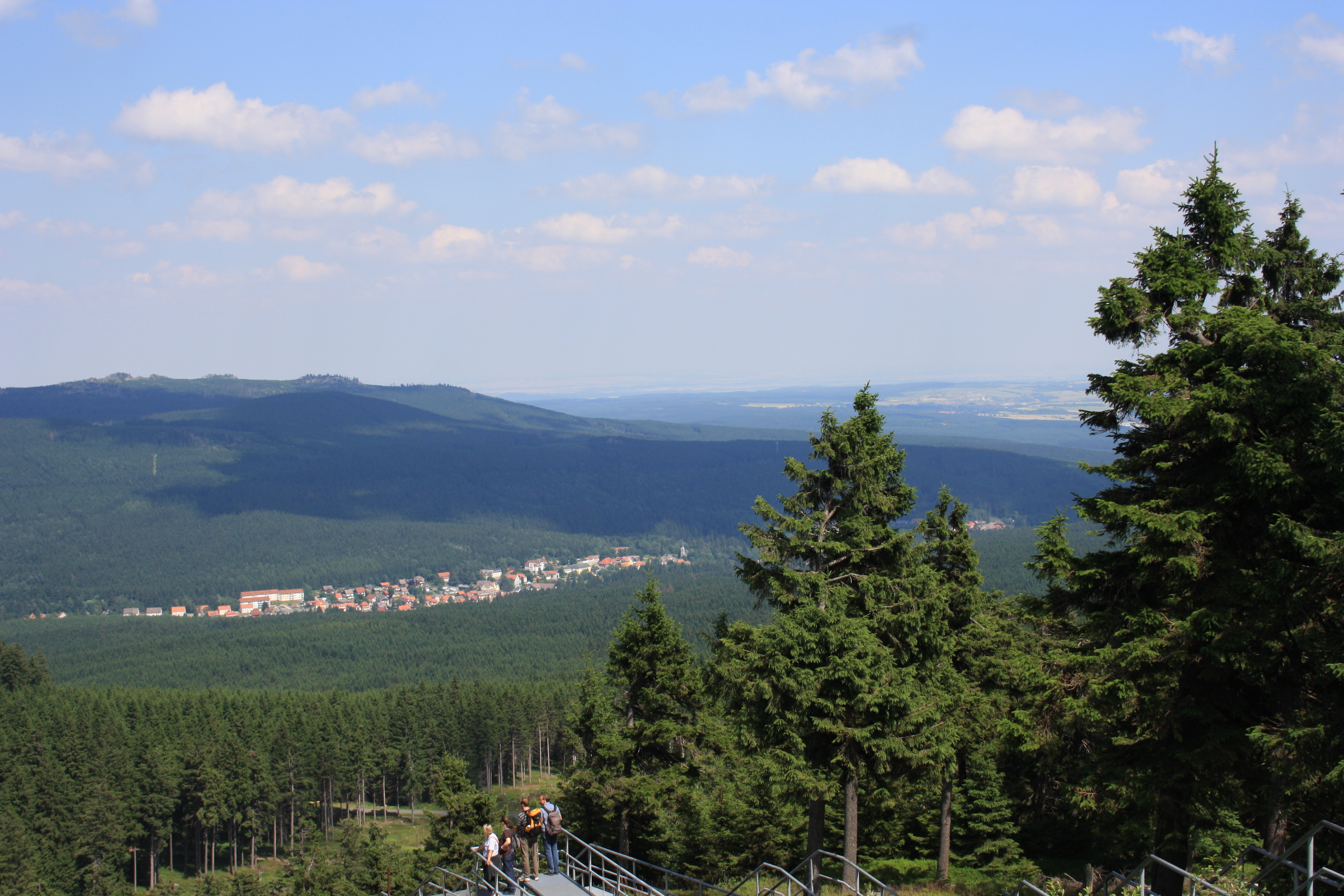
- View from Wurmberg

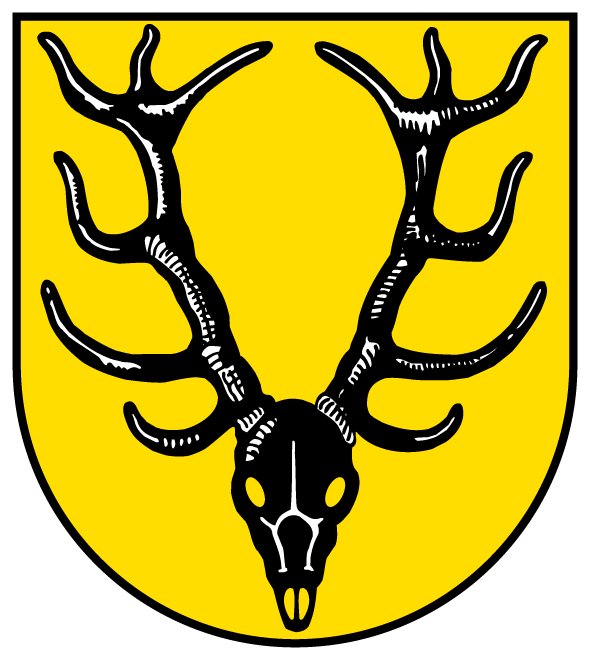
- Coat of arms
- Interactive map of Schierke
- Location within Germany Location within Saxony-Anhalt
- Coordinates: 51°45′50″N 10°39′53″E
- Country: Germany
- State: Saxony-Anhalt
- District: Harz
- Town: Wernigerode

Area
  - Total: 40.13 km^{2} (15.49 sq mi)
- Elevation: 610 m (2,000 ft)

Population (2006-12-31)
  - Total: 721
  - Density: 18.0/km^{2} (46.5/sq mi)
- Time zone: UTC+01:00 (CET)
  - Summer (DST): UTC+02:00 (CEST)
- Postal codes: 38879
- Dialling codes: 039455
- Vehicle registration: HZ
- Website: www.schierke-am-brocken.de

Schierke is a village and a former municipality in the Harz district, in the German state of Saxony-Anhalt. Since 1 July 2009, it is part of the town Wernigerode. Situated within the Harz mountain range in the valley of the river Bode, at the rim of the Harz National Park, it is mainly a tourist resort, especially for hiking and all kinds of winter sports.

== Geography ==
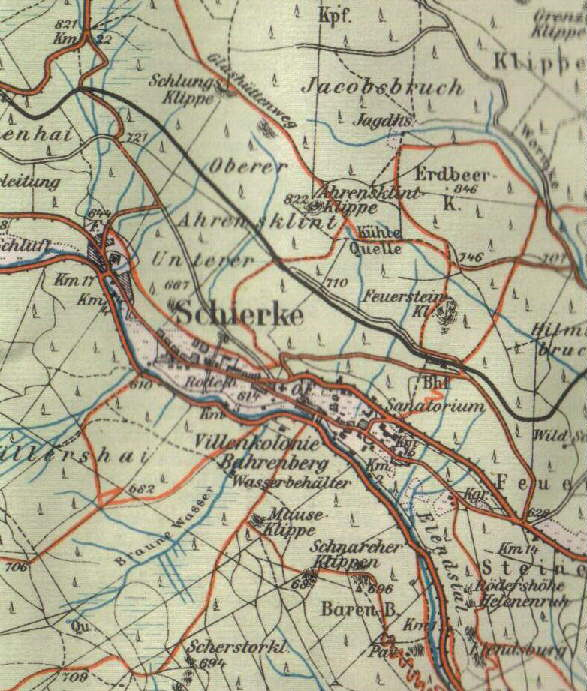
1912 map of Schierke

=== Location ===
The winter sport and climatic spa of Schierke lies in the High Harz mountains, southeast of their highest summit, the Brocken. It is situated in the Harz/Saxony-Anhalt Nature Park and borders on the Harz National Park in the north. Situated 600 to 650 m above sea level in the valley of the Cold Bode, the parish of Schierke has an area of 40.1 km² and a population of 713 (as at 31 December 2007).

Today Schierke again is a popular place to start or finish a walk to the Brocken massif via the Goetheweg or the Glashüttenweg. It has bus service and access to the Brocken Railway, whose station is located about 100 metres above the village. A popular attraction in the area is the "Brocken Coaster", a local summer rodelbahn. Schierke is also not far from downhill skiing destinations such as the slope of the Wurmberg mountain, the second highest of the Harz. Another winter activity in the area involves hiring or obtaining a sled and riding it down the "bob bahn" – a local tobogganing track.

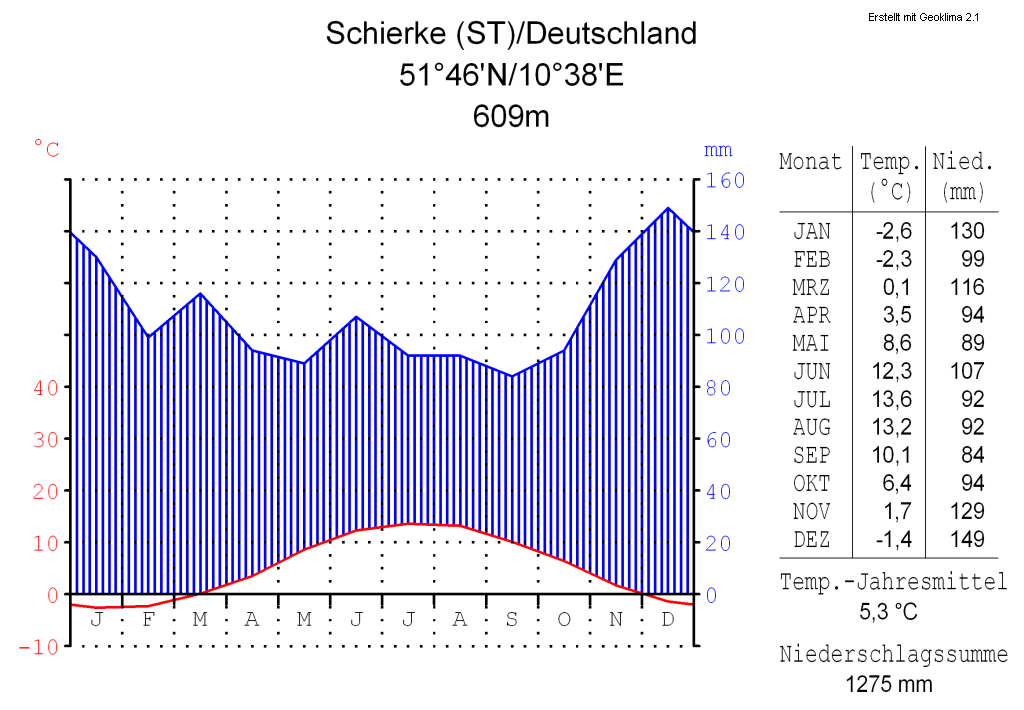
Climatic diagram of Schierke

=== Climate ===
The average air temperature in Schierke is 5.3 °C, and it has an annual precipitation of 1,275 millimetres.

== History ==
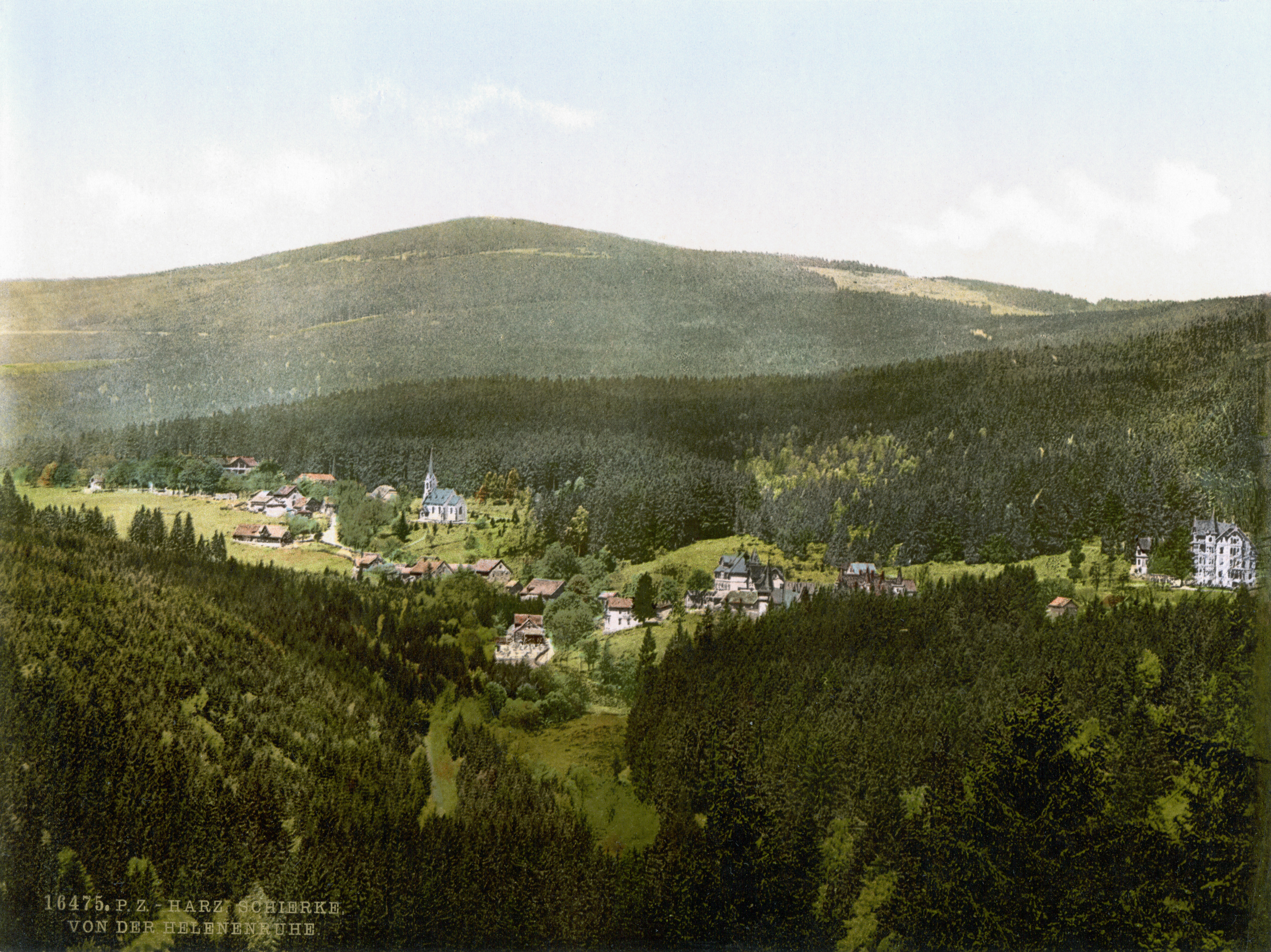
Schierke around 1900 as a photochrom from the Library of Congress collection

The field name of Schierke was first mentioned in the records in 1590 as Schiriken (the German word schier means, in the Harz area, an utterly, unspoilt wood (blankes, reines Holz). Hitherto there had been a sawmill in 1506, below the site of the subsequent village, in Elend, and a smelting works above the Cold Bode near the moor slags (Moorschlacken). A first church at the site was consecrated in 1691.

On 20 June 1898 Schierke was connected to Wernigerode by the Brocken Railway line, today run by the Harz Narrow Gauge Railways, and on 4 October 1898 the line was extended up to the Brocken summit. Thereupon, Schierke became a popular tourist destination and numerous hotels and villas arose. In 1914 and again in 1934 it was the site of the German Skeleton Championships. Schierke became a municipality in its own right in 1924.

After World War II, however, due to its location next to the inner German border, Schierke for a long time was not accessible to the public for winter sports. Visits required an extra permission by East German authorities between 1952 and 1989. Several hotels were converted into public holiday resorts of the Free German Trade Union Federation (FDGB) and of the Stasi ministry. Barracks for the Border Troops of the German Democratic Republic stood on the site of the present training centre for engineering and metallurgy. The 7th Border Company of the 20th Border Regiment guarded the stretch of border from the Brocken plateau via former Goetheweg station and the Dreieckiger Pfahl border stone (checkpoint no. 168 in the Harzer Wandernadel) to the Großer Winterberg. Each troop was stationed for a week at a time in the present-day station building on the peak of the Brocken.

After German reunification, tourism again prospered and many villas were restored. On 13 January 2009 Mayor Hans-Jochen Ermisch, and his counterpart from Wernigerode, Peter Gaffert, signed the treaty incorporating Schierke into Wernigerode. This merger came into effect on 1 July 2009. Since then, the Wernigerode town council has made comprehensive efforts to develop Schierke as a resort town.

== Politics ==
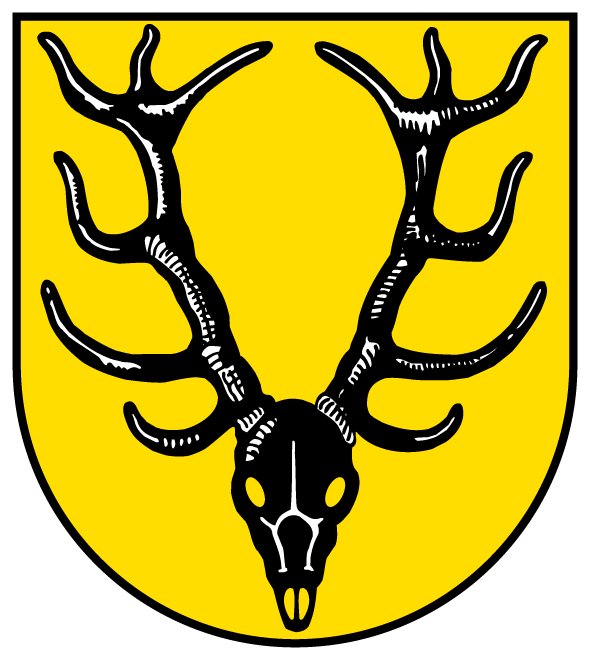
Coat of arms

=== Coat of arms ===
The coat of arms was granted to Schierke on 5 May 1939 by the governor (Oberpräsident) of the Province of Saxony.

Emblazonment: "On a field or, a stag's skull and antlers sable" ("In gold ein schwarzer Hirsch-Schädel mit Geweih im Visier").

The stag's antlers epitomize the "King of the Harz Forest", the dominant wild animal in the mountain forests around Schierke. Just as the antlers are the crown of the deer, Schierke, on the Brocken, "crowns" the Harz landscape with its natural beauty and its healing climate.

The coat of arms was designed by the head of the Magdeburg state archives, Otto Korn.

== Memorials ==
- Grave site on the village cemetery (Ortsfriedhof) for an unknown Rumanian, who was a victim of forced labour during the Second World War.

== Places of interest ==
- Brocken, highest mountain in the Harz, accessible daily on the Brocken Railway
- Wurmberg, highest mountain in Lower Saxony
- Feuersteinklippen crags
- Schnarcherklippen crags
- "Apotheke zum Roten Fingerhut" – "Red Thimble" chemist's
- Schierke Mountain Church (Schierker Bergkirche)

== Sport and hiking ==
The area around Schierke is criss-crossed by numerous trails, several leading up to the top of the Brocken. There is a choice of longer or shorter, but usually steeper, walks. The Wurmberg Trail (Wurmbergstieg) runs up to the summit of the Wurmberg. From the station, a trail runs directly to the tor known as the Feuersteinklippe. For winter sports lovers, Schierke has an extensive cross-country skiing trail network and a natural ice rink.

In the first half of the 20th century Schierke was known for its skeleton run, where the German Championships were twice held – in 1914 and 1934. In 1950 the first East German national winter sports championships took place here, being portrayed on one of two special stamps by the East German Deutsche Post.

In Schierke there is a summer rodelbahn, the Brockencoaster with a sun terrace.

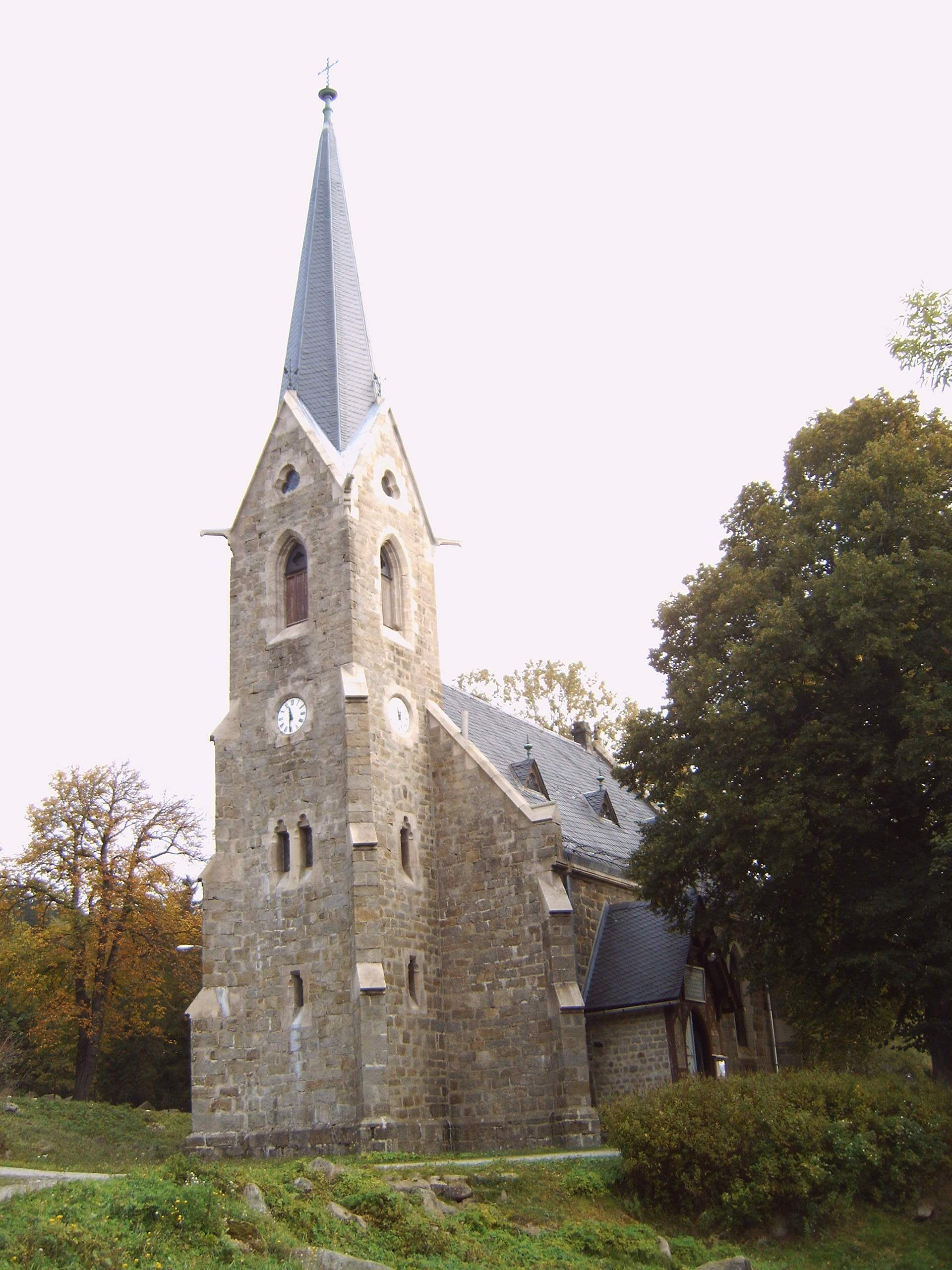
Schierke Mountain Church

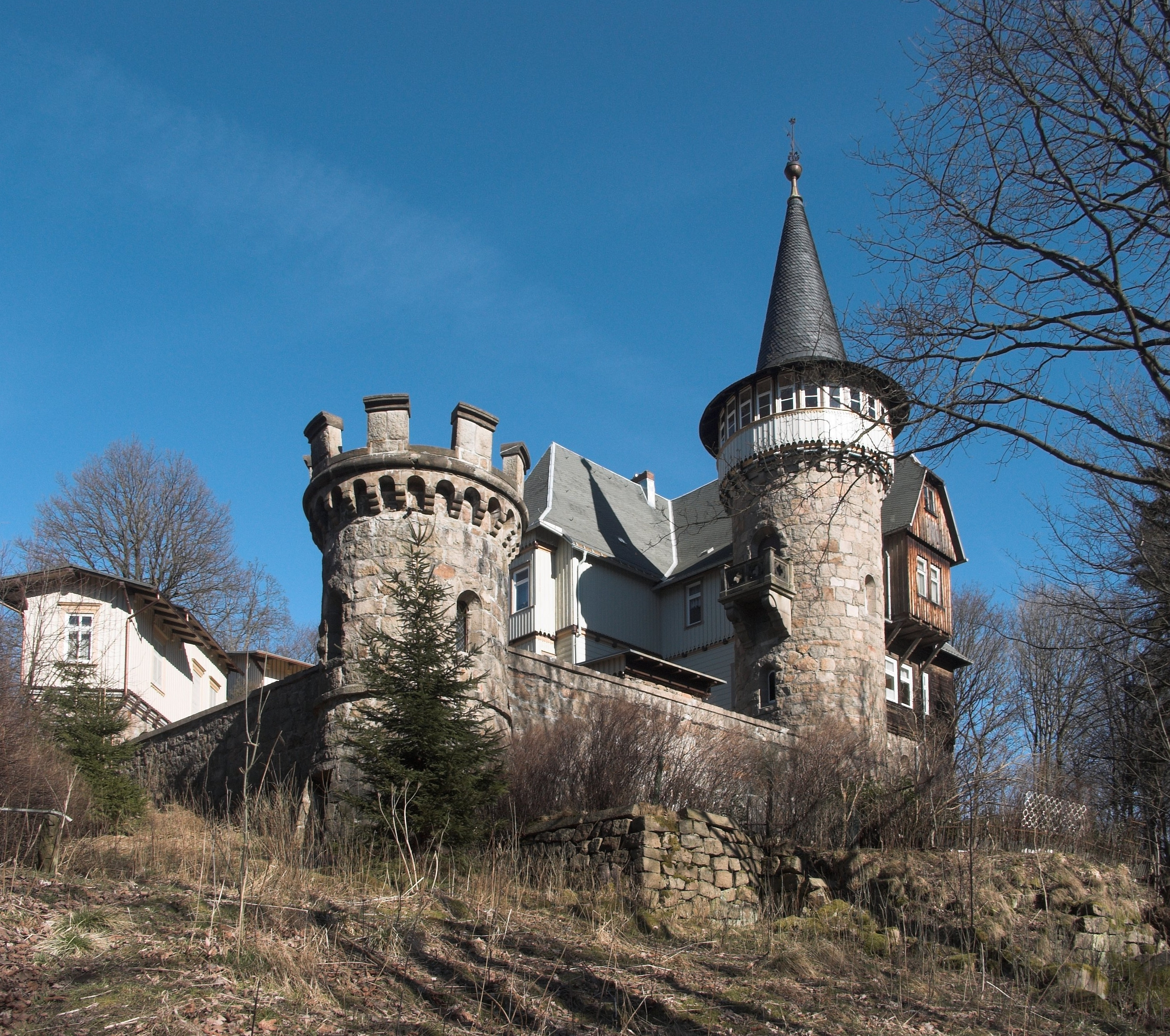
Schierke Castle at the head of the Elend valley

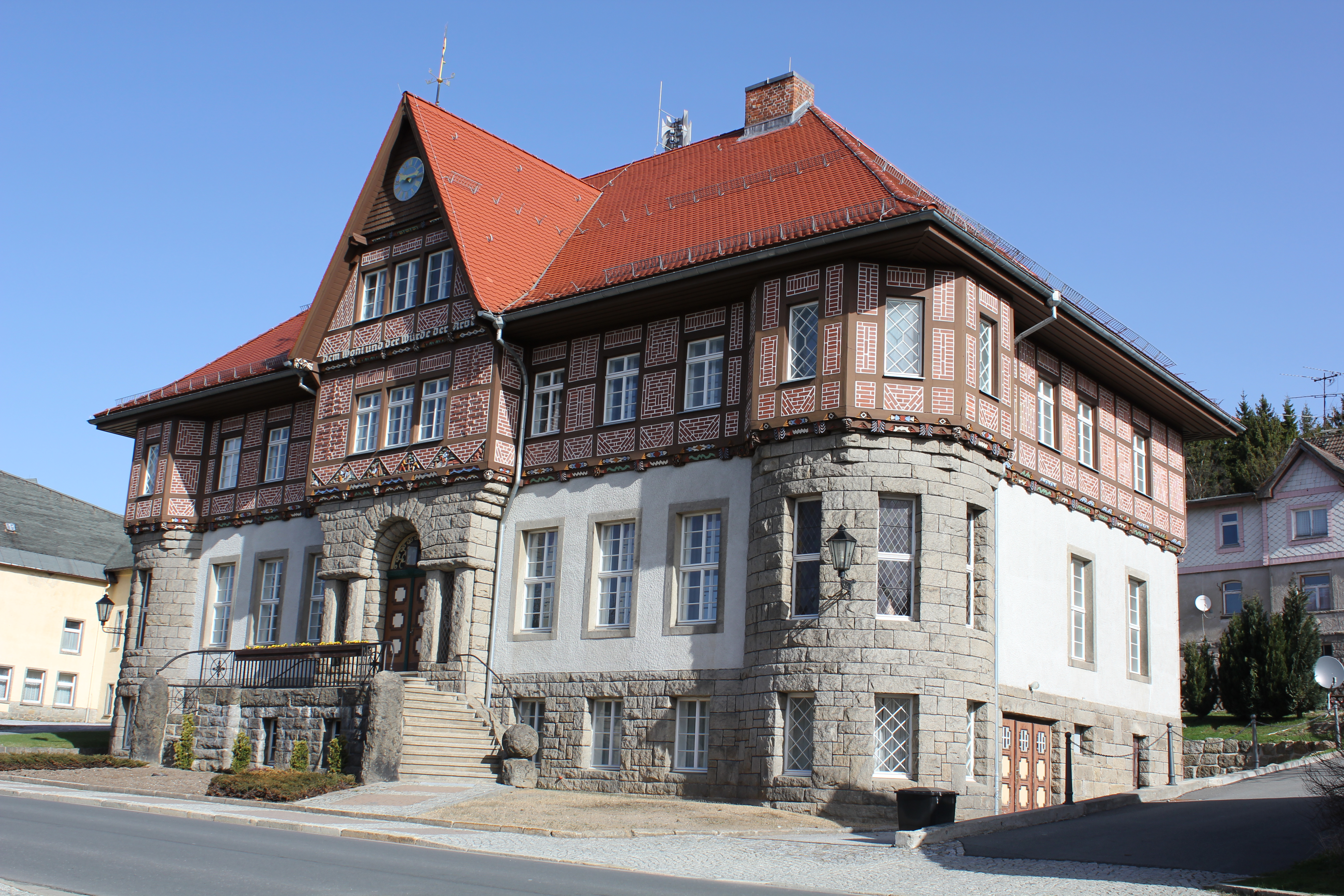
Schierke village hall

== Notable people ==
Johann Wolfgang von Goethe visited Schierke in 1784. The Walpurgis Night scene in Faust: The First Part of the Tragedy is set in the "District of Schierke and Elend".

== Schierker Feuerstein ==
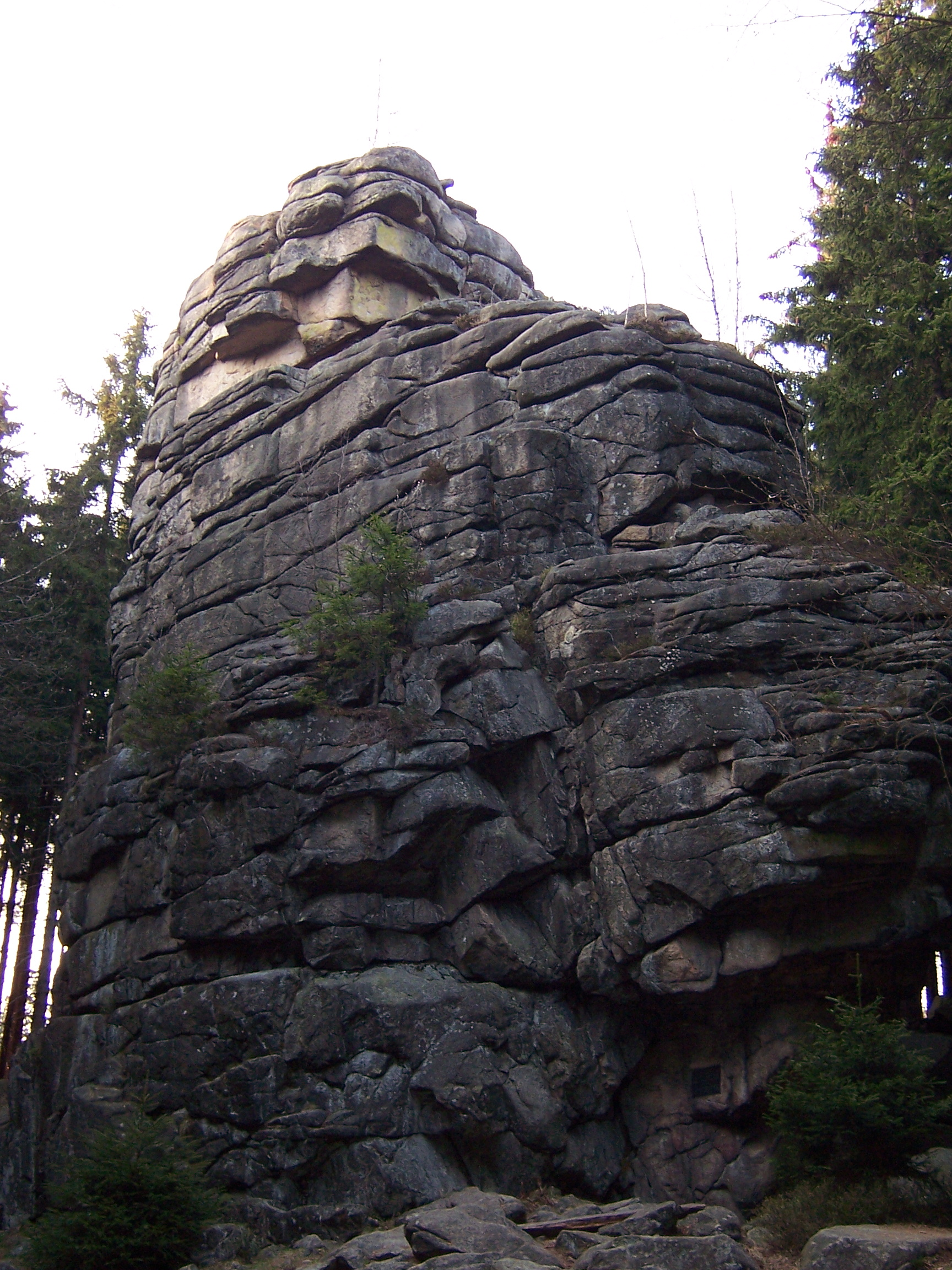
Feuersteinklippe rock

Schierker Feuerstein is a herbal liqueur and digestif (35% abv), patented in 1924 by the local chemist, Willy Drube. The red-brown beverage is named after the red granite of the Feuersteinklippe, a tor-like rock formation nearby. After World War II the production at first continued in Bad Lauterberg on the western side of the inner German border, but was also resumed in Schierke from 1972 on as Volkseigener Betrieb. After reunification the enterprises merged while the Feuerstein is still bottled at both locations.
