= Harzer Wandernadel =

System of hiking awards in the Harz mountains, Germany

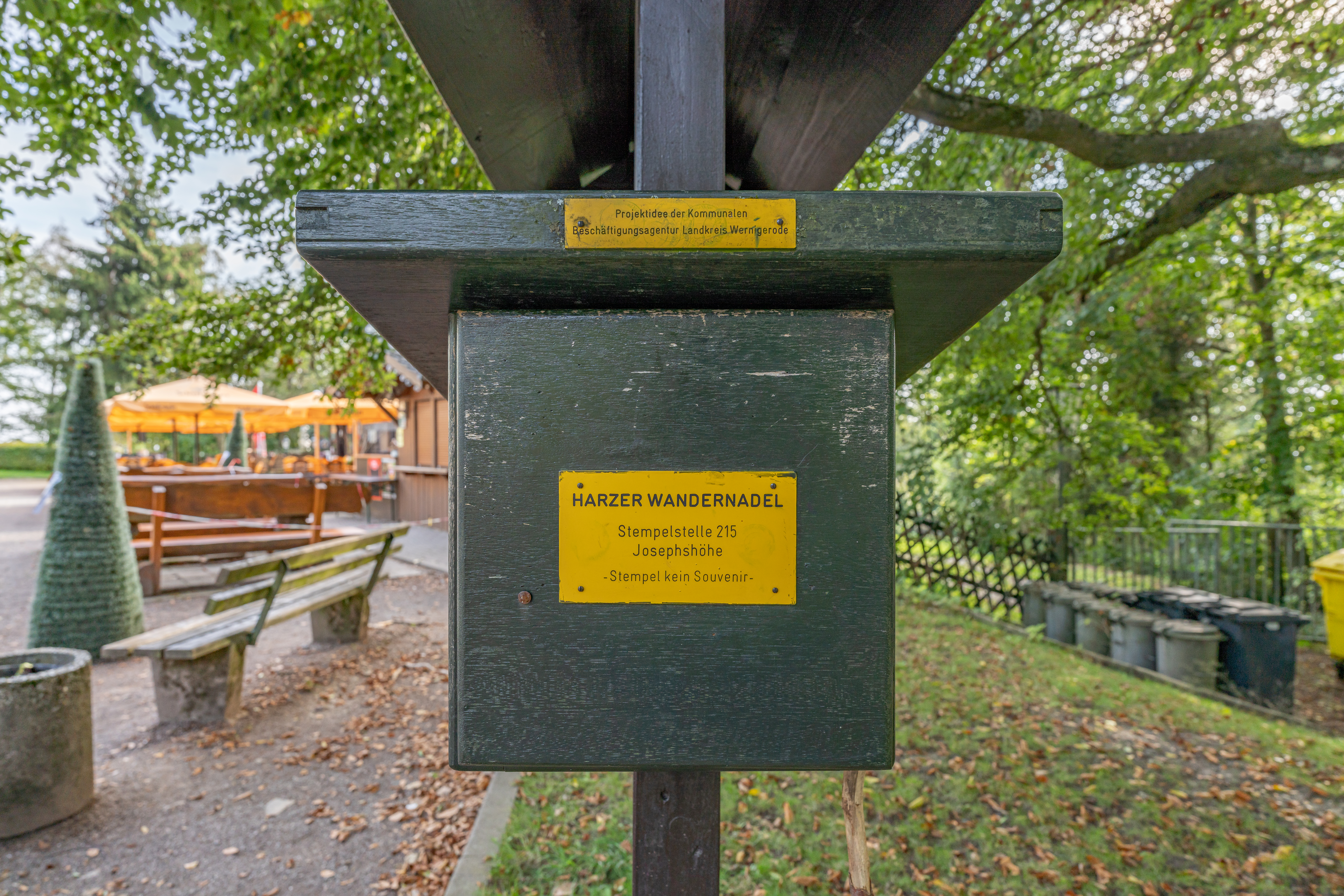
Josephshöhe checkpoint on the Harz Hikers network

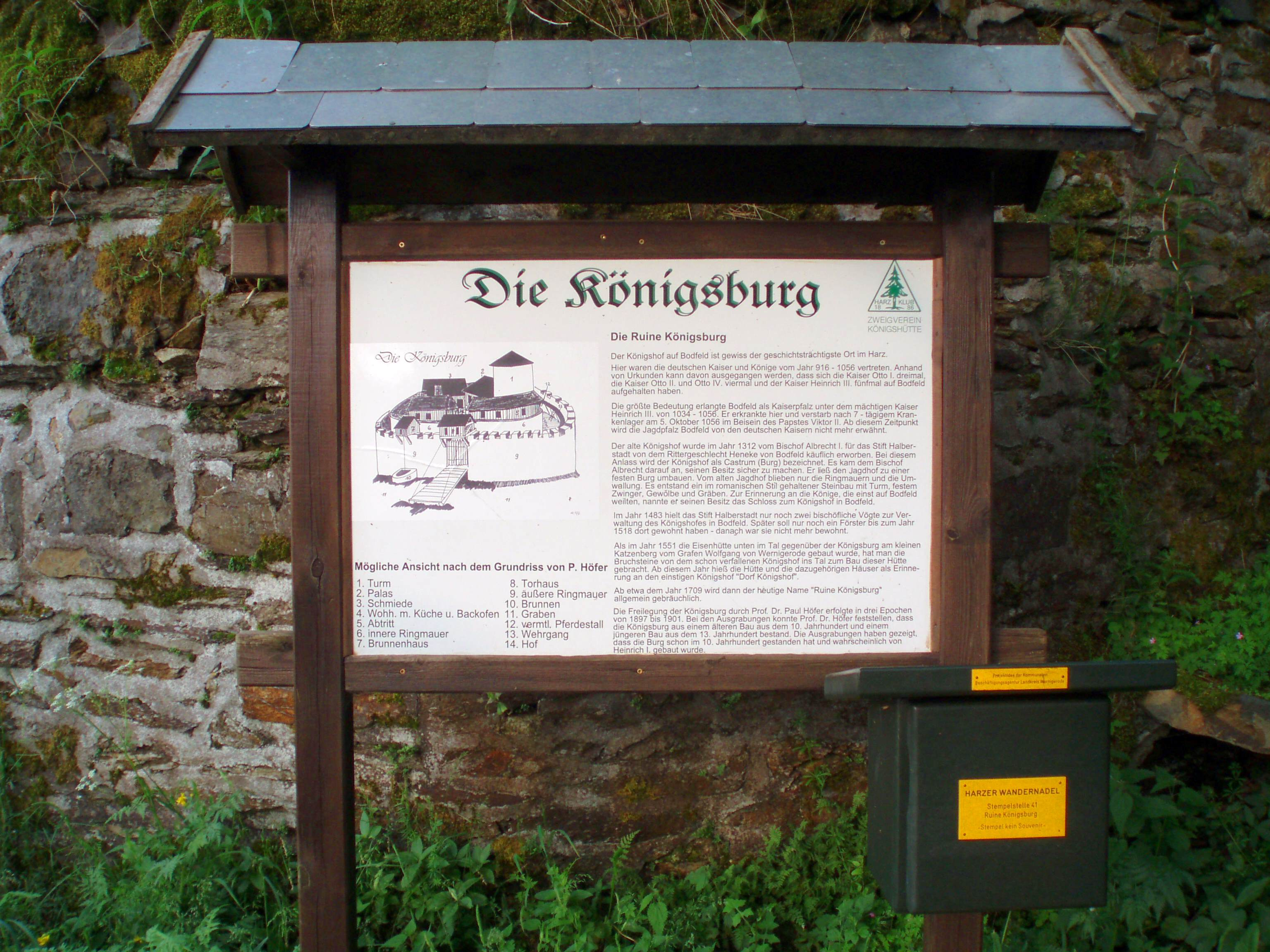
Checkpoint at the Königsburg

The Harzer Wandernadel is a system of hiking awards in the Harz mountains in central Germany. Hikers (or mountain bikers) can earn awards at different levels of challenge by walking to the various checkpoints in the network and stamping their passbooks to record the visit. With 222 checkpoints in three federal states and across five districts in the Harz and with membership in five figures, the system has gained a following Germany-wide.

== Purpose ==
The idea of the Wandernadel (literally "hiking needle/pin," "hiking badge") is to give those holidaying in the Harz a worthwhile goal to achieve and encourage them to stay for longer or return. It also aims to encourage those who live in the local area to go hiking and improve their fitness.

In addition the system helps tourists and locals to get to know the many different sights and hiking trails in the Harz. To that end, checkpoints have been located at scenic viewing points, places of geological or botanical, culturalbor historical or interest.With a few exceptions, the checkpoints can only be reached on foot or bicycle.

== Hiking badge system ==
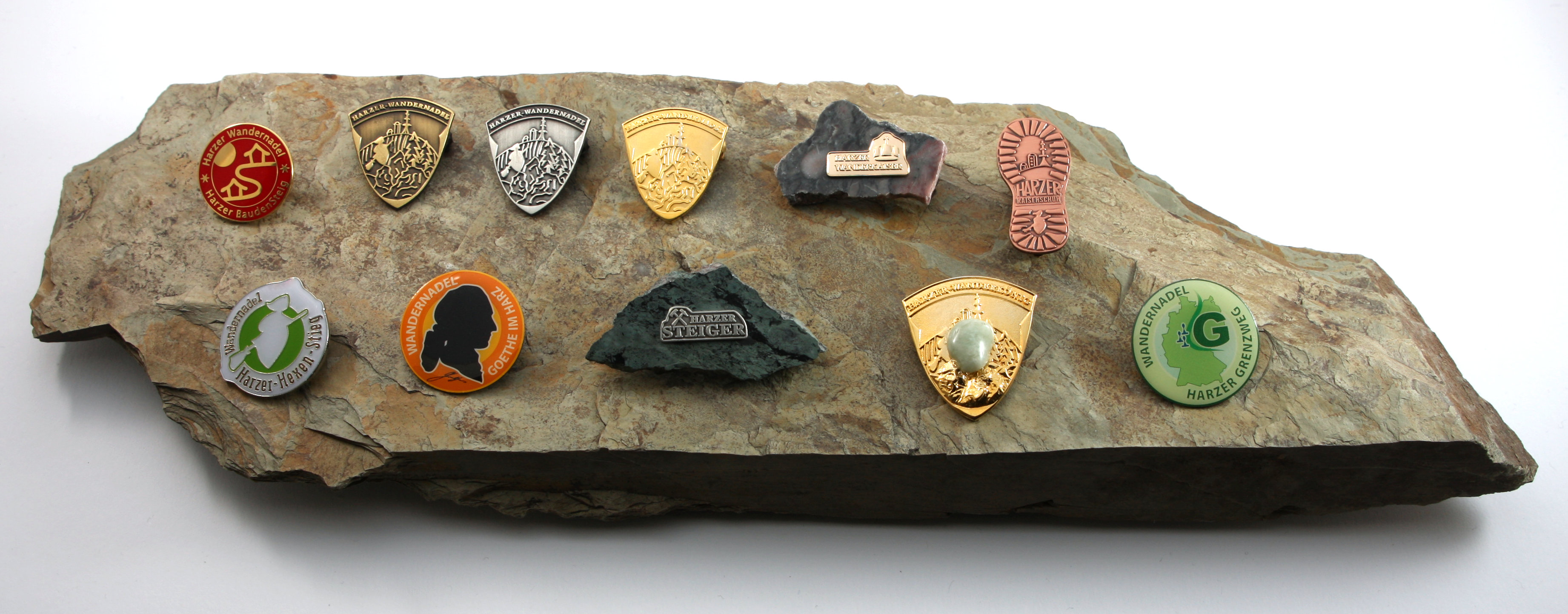
The hiking badges

Harz hiking badges are awarded at several levels depending on the number of checkpoints reached (verified by stamping a pass book):

- 8 stamps: Harz hiking badge in bronze
- 16 stamps: Harz hiking badge in silver
- 24 stamps: Harz hiking badge in gold
- 50 stamps: Harz Hiking King (Wanderkönig) or Queen (Wanderkönigin)
- 100 stamps: Harz Imperial Rucksack (Kaiserrucksack)
- 111 stamps: Harz Mining Foreman (Steiger) (111 different control points, of which 22 are special checkpoints connected with mining in the Harz)
- 150 stamps: Harz Imperial Boot (Kaiserschuh)
- 222 stamps: Harz Hiking Emperor (Wanderkaiser) or Empress (Wanderkaiserin)

The awards may be earned over any period of time; there is no time limit within which the stamps have to be collected.

In addition there are special themed hiking badges that may be earned. For example there is one for collecting 11 stamps on checkpoints located on the Harzer Hexenstieg the "Harz Witch's Path". Others include a Goethe Way (Goetheweg) badge and an Inner German Border badge.

It is also possible, in addition to collecting all 222 stamps, to collect several additional special stamps that are recorded at the end of a walking pass. These special stamps are only collector's items and do not count towards any award.

== Process for getting a hiking badge ==
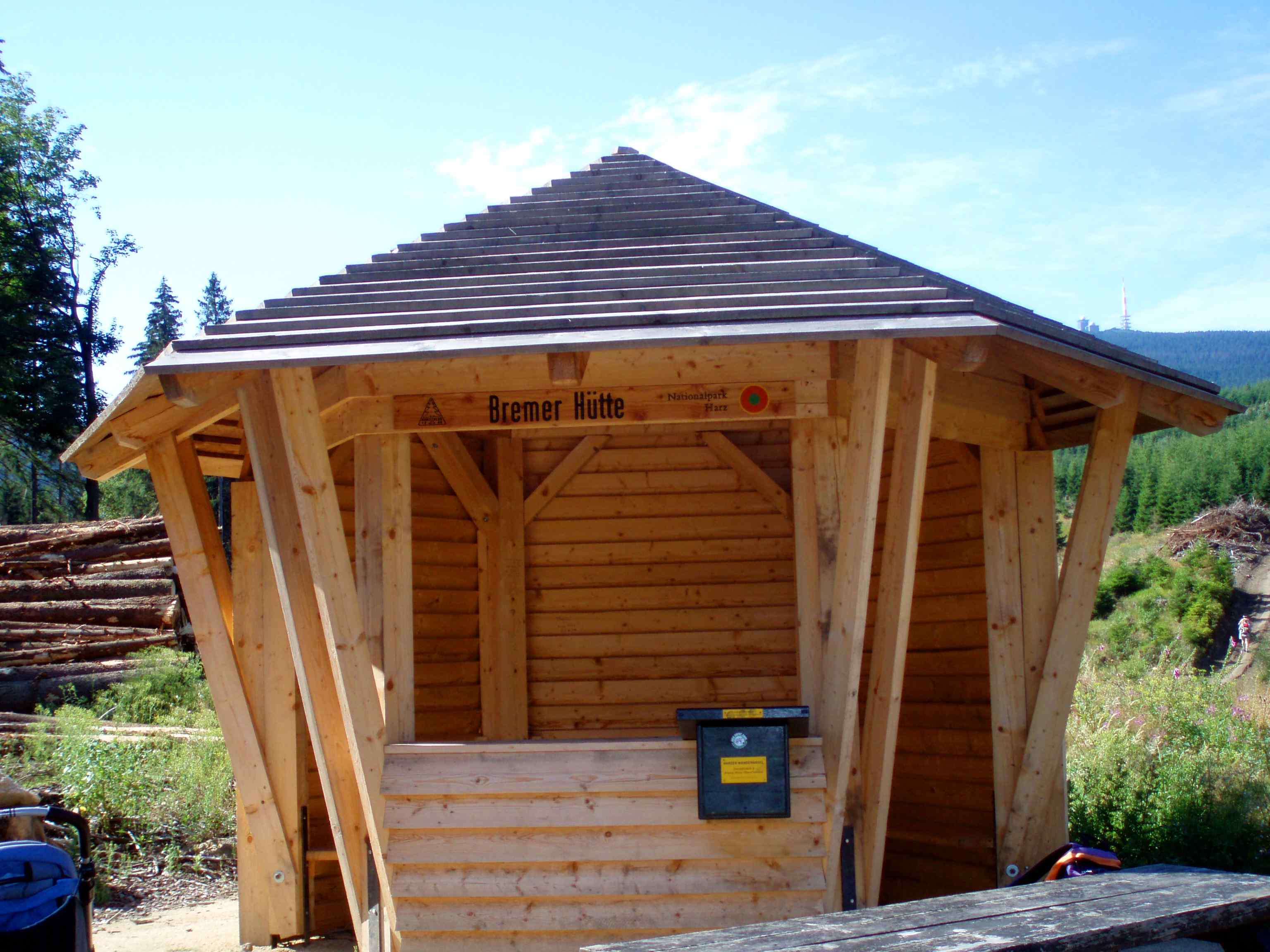
Checkpoint at the Bremen Hut

Before visiting checkpoints and starting to collect stamps, the hiker first needs to buy a hiking pass book (Wanderpass); these can be obtained cheaply online or in the tourist and spa facilities in the towns and villages of the Harz, in participating pubs within the network and in some bookshops. It is also worthwhile buying a set of 3 maps on which the checkpoints are marked, although this information can be found in other ways, including the organiser's website. The website first published its English pages in 2012 with the support of the British garrison in Hohne.

The pass must be stamped at each checkpoint. If the stamp is missing or damaged, a code number can be noted down as an alternative. This ensures that vandalism should not prevent hikers from collecting points towards their badges.

On gaining the requisite number of stamps, the pass is handed in again at a counter and the badges can be bought at little cost after the pass has been checked. The Foreman (Steiger) and Emperor (Kaiser) badges can only be obtained from the Harzer Wandernadel main office in Blankenburg, which is only open Monday to Friday during working hours.

== Features ==
The Harz hiking badge is significantly different from many other hiking badge systems. For example, there are hardly any other places where there is a system with as many as 222 control points crossing state and district boundaries. In addition the system is relatively well protected from vandalism and can be set up anywhere on the terrain, whilst with other systems the checkpoints are at restaurants, shops, etc., and can only be used during opening hours.

Unlike other hiking badge projects, the hassle of enrolling as a 'customer' is avoided, because the stamps may be collected freely without needing to supply anyone with a telephone number or address.

== History ==
The initiator and operator is the Gesund älter werden im Harz ("Aging healthily in the Harz") with its head office in Blankenburg, which is supported by various public institutions. The first checkpoints were set up in 2006; since 2007 the current system of 222 control points has been available. There are no plans to extend it, however the checkpoints are sometimes relocated to different places in the Harz.

== Resonance ==
The system soon gained extraordinary popularity, as can clearly be seen from the number of walkers stamping their passes at the control points. In 2009 alone about 10,000 hiking passes were sold. It is also noteworthy that in each year there has been a three-figure number of walkers that have achieved the highest award, the "Harz Hiking Emperor". (As the control points are spread across a 110 km long and 30 - 40 km wide range of low mountains, covering all of them may take a total of several weeks spent on the trails and travelling to the trails.)

== Locations ==
Some of examples of checkpoints in the Harzer Wandernadel are listed below:

Checkpoint No.	Name	Description	Location
1	Eckertalsperre (Staumauer)	Barrier of the Ecker Dam	4 km SE of Bad Harzburg
5	Froschfelsen	The Froschfelsen rock formation that looks like a frog	2 km SW of Ilsenburg
9	Brocken	The Brocken, the highest peak in the Harz	Brocken House
17	Trudenstein	The Trudenstein rock formation	2.5 km NE of Schierke
80	Burgruine Regenstein	Regenstein Castle	2 km N of Blankenburg
98	Ruine Hohnstein	Hohnstein Castle	1 km NNE of Neustadt/Harz
101	Einhornhöhle	Unicorn Cave, a popular show cave	near Scharzfeld
122	Kreuz des Deutschen Ostens	An Ostlandkreuz, a cross in memory of former eastern German lands	Above Bad Harzburg to the SE

=== List of checkpoints ===
The following is a list of all the checkpoints as at December 2012. They are listed by their German names used by the Harzer Wandernadel.

==== 1 to 60 ====
- 1 - Eckertalsperre - Staumauer
- 2 - Scharfenstein - Rangerstation
- 3 - Am Kruzifix
- 4 - Taubenklippe
- 5 - Froschfelsen
- 6 - Oberer Ilsefälle (Bremer Hütte)
- 7 - Gasthaus Plessenburg
- 8 - Stempelsbuche
- 9 - Brocken House
- 10 - Große Zeterklippe
- 11 - Eckerloch
- 12 - Achtermannshöhe
- 13 - Ahrensklint
- 14 - Schnarcherklippe
- 15 - Leistenklippe
- 16 - Ferdinandstein
- 17 - Trudenstein
- 18 - Grenzweg zum Kaffeehorst
- 19 - Skidenkmal
- 20 - Barenberg (Aussichtspunkt)
- 21 - Helenenruh Elend
- 22 - Gelber Brink
- 23 - Molkenhausstern
- 24 - Wolfsklippe
- 25 - Oberförster-Koch-Denkmal
- 26 - Mönchsbuche
- 27 - Ottofelsen
- 28 - Gasthaus Steinerne Renne
- 29 - Elversstein
- 30 - Ilsestein
- 31 - Agnesberg
- 32 - Gasthaus Christianental
- 33 - Stapenberg
- 34 - Scharfenstein
- 35 - Gasthaus Armeleuteberg
- 36 - Peterstein
- 37 - Büchenberg
- 38 - Galgenberg
- 39 - Tagebau Felswerke
- 40 - Königshütter Wasserfall
- 41 - Ruine Königsburg
- 42 - Trogfurther Brücke
- 43 - Wasserscheide Weser-Elbe "Hohe Tür"
- 44 - Kapitelsberg
- 45 - Dicke Tannen
- 46 - Grenzmuseum am Ring der Erinnerung
- 47 - Oberharzblick am Buchenberg
- 48 - Stierbergsteich
- 49 - Grüntal
- 50 - Walzenhütte
- 51 - Carlsturm
- 52 - Trageburg am Hexenstieg
- 53 - Hassel-Vorsperre
- 54 - Rotestein
- 55 - Wüstung Selkenfelde / Kirche
- 56 - Rappbodeblick Trautenstein
- 57 - Echowiese Allrode
- 58 - Pferdchen
- 59 - Klostergrund Michaelstein
- 60 - Stemberghaus - Köhlerei

==== 61 to 120 ====
- 61 - Harzer Grauwacke Rieder
- 62 - Talsperre Wendefurth (Talsperrenblick)
- 63 - Schöneburg (Aussichtspunkt)
- 64 - Böser Kleef (Aussichtspunkt)
- 65 - Gasthaus Todtenrode
- 66 - Wilhelmsblick (Aussichtspunkt)
- 67 - Weißer Hirsch (Aussichtspunkt)
- 68 - Pfeil-Denkmal
- 69 - Sonnenklippe (Bodetal)
- 70 - Prinzensicht (Aussichtspunkt)
- 71 - Rosstrappe (Abzweig Schurre)
- 72 - La Viershöhe
- 73 - Glockenstein
- 74 - Hamburger Wappen (Teufelsmauer)
- 75 - Hahnenkleeklippen
- 76 - Großvaterfelsen
- 77 - Ruine Luisenburg
- 78 - Barocke Gärten
- 79 - Otto-Ebert-Brücke (am Herzogsweg)
- 80 - Burgruine Regenstein
- 81 - Sandhöhlen im Heers
- 82 - Regensteinmühle
- 83 - Austbergturm
- 84 - Altenburg (bei Heimburg)
- 85 - Wasserkunst Thumkuhlental
- 86 - Bisongehege
- 87 - Volkmarskeller
- 88 - Aussichtspavillon Hoher Kleef
- 89 - Schornsteinberg
- 90 - Roter Schuss
- 91 - Weltkulturerbe Rammelsberg
- 92 - Poppenberg mit Aussichtsturm
- 93 - Dreitälerblick
- 94 - Drei-Herren-Stein
- 95 - Ilfelder Wetterfahne
- 96 - Ehemalige Steinmühle
- 97 - Ziegenalm
- 98 - Ruine Hohnstein
- 99 - Komödienplatz
- 100 - Ebersburg
- 101 - Einhornhöhle
- 102 - Vereinsplatz
- 103 - Kalte Birke
- 104 - Tränkebachhütte
- 105 - Prinzenlaube
- 106 - Schöne Aussicht, Bielstein
- 107 - Maaßener Gaipel
- 108 - Brockenblick
- 109 - Heimburg
- 110 - Granestausee
- 111 - Graneblockhaus
- 112 - Liebesbank
- 113 - Grumbacher Teiche
- 114 - Hütte am Sidecum
- 115 - Bismarckturm
- 116 - Verlobungsinsel in der Oker
- 117 - Treppenstein
- 118 - Kästehaus
- 119 - Hallesche Hütte
- 120 - Elfenstein

==== 121 to 180 ====
- 121 - Säperstelle
- 122 - Kreuz des deutschen Ostens
- 123 - Gaststätte Rinderstall
- 124 - Köte am Heidenstieg
- 125 - Schalker Turm
- 126 - Lochstein, Oberer Schalker Graben
- 127 - Weppner Hütte, Jägersbleeker Teich
- 128 - Huttaler Widerwaage
- 129 - Hütte im Arboretum
- 130 - Iberger Albertturm
- 131 - Kaysereiche (Schutzhütte)
- 132 - Schwarzenberg, Köte Brockenblick
- 133 - Förster-Ludwig-Platz
- 134 - Brander Klippe
- 135 - Wolfswarte
- 136 - Eckersprung
- 137 - Bärenbrucher Teich
- 138 - Braunseck
- 139 - Kuckholzklippe
- 140 - Eselsplatz
- 141 - Lasfelde Tränke
- 142 - Handwerkers Ruh
- 143 - Köte Schindelkopf
- 144 - Hanskühnenburg
- 145 - Schmidts-Denkmal
- 146 - Morgenbrodtshütte
- 147 - Pavilion Ackerblick
- 148 - Waidmannsruhe
- 149 - Kleine Oker
- 150 - Großer Knollen
- 151 - Ruine Scharzfels
- 152 - Knollenkreuz
- 153 - Schadenbeeksköpfe
- 154 - Dreibrodestein
- 155 - Rehberger Grabenhaus
- 156 - Wurmberg-Baude
- 157 - Kapellenfleck
- 158 - Hassenstein
- 159 - Stöberhai
- 160 - Helenenruh
- 161 - Stephanhütte
- 162 - Alte Wache
- 163 - Bremer Klippe
- 164 - Stiefmutter
- 165 - Wendel-Eiche
- 166 - Helbing-Hütte (AP Sachsenstein)
- 167 - Hexentanzplatz (= Ellricher Blick)
- 168 - Dreieckiger Pfahl
- 169 - Molkenhaus
- 170 - Rabenklippe
- 171 - Altarklippe
- 172 - Katzsohlteich
- 173 - Gaststätte Hirschbüchenkopf
- 174 - Hohnehof
- 175 - Schaubergwerk Glasebach
- 176 - Uhlenköpfe Hänichen
- 177 - Verlobungsurne Alexisbad
- 178 - Hirschgrund (am Gasthaus Königsruhe)
- 179 - IV. Friedrichshammer
- 180 - Gaststätte Selkemühle

==== 181 to 222 ====
- 181 - Schlossmühle Ballenstedt
- 182 - Schirm
- 183 - Försterblick Gernrode
- 184 - Bärendenkmal
- 185 - Preußenturm
- 186 - Anhaltinischer Saalstein
- 187 - Lauenburg
- 188 - Teufelsmauer Weddersleben
- 189 - Große Teufelsmühle
- 190 - Bergrat-Müller-Teich
- 191 - Laubtalblick
- 192 - Historischer Gipsbrennofen
- 193 - Stahlquelle
- 194 - Hellergrund
- 195 - Köthener Hütte
- 196 - Bremer Teich
- 197 - Burgruine Anhalt
- 198 - Glockensteine
- 199 - Bismarckturm
- 200 - Burg Falkenstein
- 201 - Konradsburg
- 202 - Landschaftspark Degenershausen
- 203 - Schutzhütte am Mettenberg
- 204 - Selkesicht an der Ackeburg
- 205 - Rastplatz unterhalb des Clusberges
- 206 - Hahnestein
- 207 - Mausoleum
- 208 - Burgruine Grillenburg
- 209 - Moltkewarte (Aussichtsturm)
- 210 - Meilerplatz an der Kohlenstraße
- 211 - Kunstteich
- 212 - An der Queste
- 213 - Bauerngraben (südl. periodischer See)
- 214 - Heimkehle
- 215 - Josephshöhe (Auerberg)
- 216 - Hunrodeiche
- 217 - Dicke Buche
- 218 - Neustädter Talsperre
- 219 - Wippertalsperre (Staumauer)
- 220 - Schutzhütte Philippsgruß
- 221 - Jungfernklippe
- 222 - Schaubergwerk Röhrigschacht
