= Moltke Watchtower =

Observation tower near Sangerhausen, Germany

Moltke Watchtower Moltkewarte
| Tower type: | Viewing tower |
| Country: | Germany |
| State: | Saxony-Anhalt |
| County: | Mansfeld-Südharz |
| Municipality: | Sangerhausen-Lengefeld |
| Location: | Schlößchenkopf |
| Geo-coordinates: | 51°29′34″N 11°16′15″E |
| Elevation: | ca. 310.3 m above sea level (NN) |
| Height: | ca. 26 m |
| Viewing platform: | ca. 336 m above sea level (NN) |
| Built: | 1903 |
| Inaugurated: | 26 October 1903 |

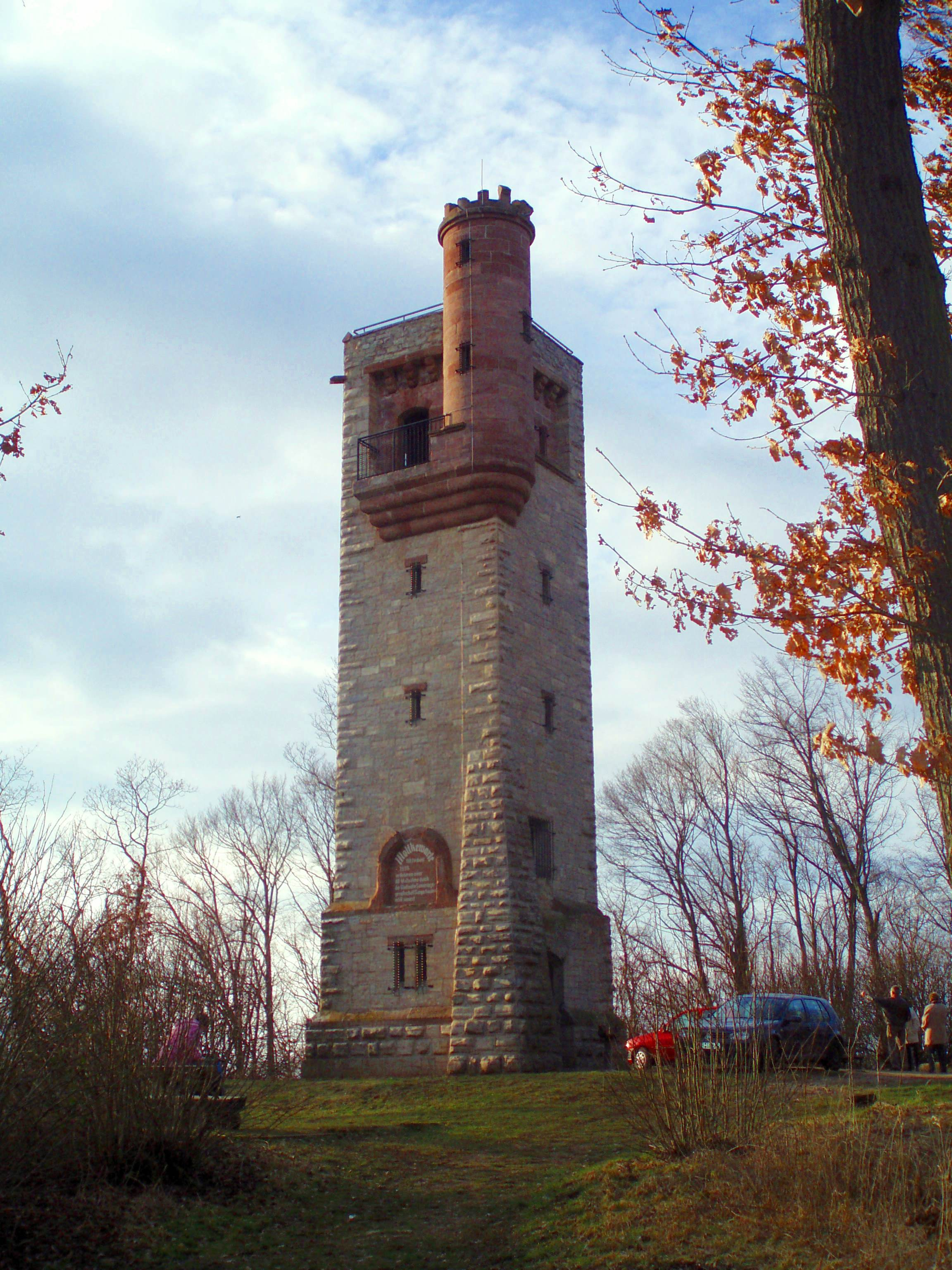
The Moltke Watchtower

The Moltke Watchtower (German: Moltkewarte) is an observation tower in the Harz Mountains of central Germany, near the village of Lengefeld, in the county of Mansfeld-Südharz in the state of Saxony-Anhalt.

== Location ==
The Moltke Watchtower is located in the Lower Harz in the Harz/Saxony-Anhalt Nature Park. It is also within the South Harz Karst Landscape Biosphere Reserve, just south of Lengefeld in the municipality of Sangershausen. The tower stands on the hill known as the Schlößchenkopf or Hoher Berg, (310.3 m above sea level (NN)), which rises to the east of the valley of the Brechtewendische Bach. About 1.1 km east of the tower is the large, cone-shaped tip on the Hohe Linde, a reminder of the copper shale (Kupferschiefer) mining that used to be carried out in the nearby Thomas Münzer Shaft.

== History ==
The Moltke Tower was built in 1903 of roestone (Rogenstein) and opened on 26 October that year. Its sponsor was the Sangerhausen branch of the Harz Club. The monument was inaugurated by the Prussian field marshal, Helmuth Karl Bernhard von Moltke (1800–1891). During the East German period the tower became dilapidated and, as a result, it was and thoroughly renovated in 1995 as part of a job creation scheme by the municipal redevelopment company, Sangerhausen mbH. Since 2007, there have been commemorative events on 11 March for the German resistance fighter, Helmuth James von Moltke (1907–1945).

== Views and hiking ==
From the viewing platform (ca. 336 metres above sea level), which is accessible at weekends and public holidays in the warmer months, there are good views, of the Goldene Aue, the Kyffhäuser hills, of Lengefeld and the nearby mine of Röhrigschacht near Wettelrode. The tower is also No. 209 in the system of checkpoints in the Harzer Wandernadel hiking network; the green box is in the refuge hut next to the observation tower.
