= Lower Grumbach Pond =

Lower Grumbach Pond Unterer Grumbacher Teich
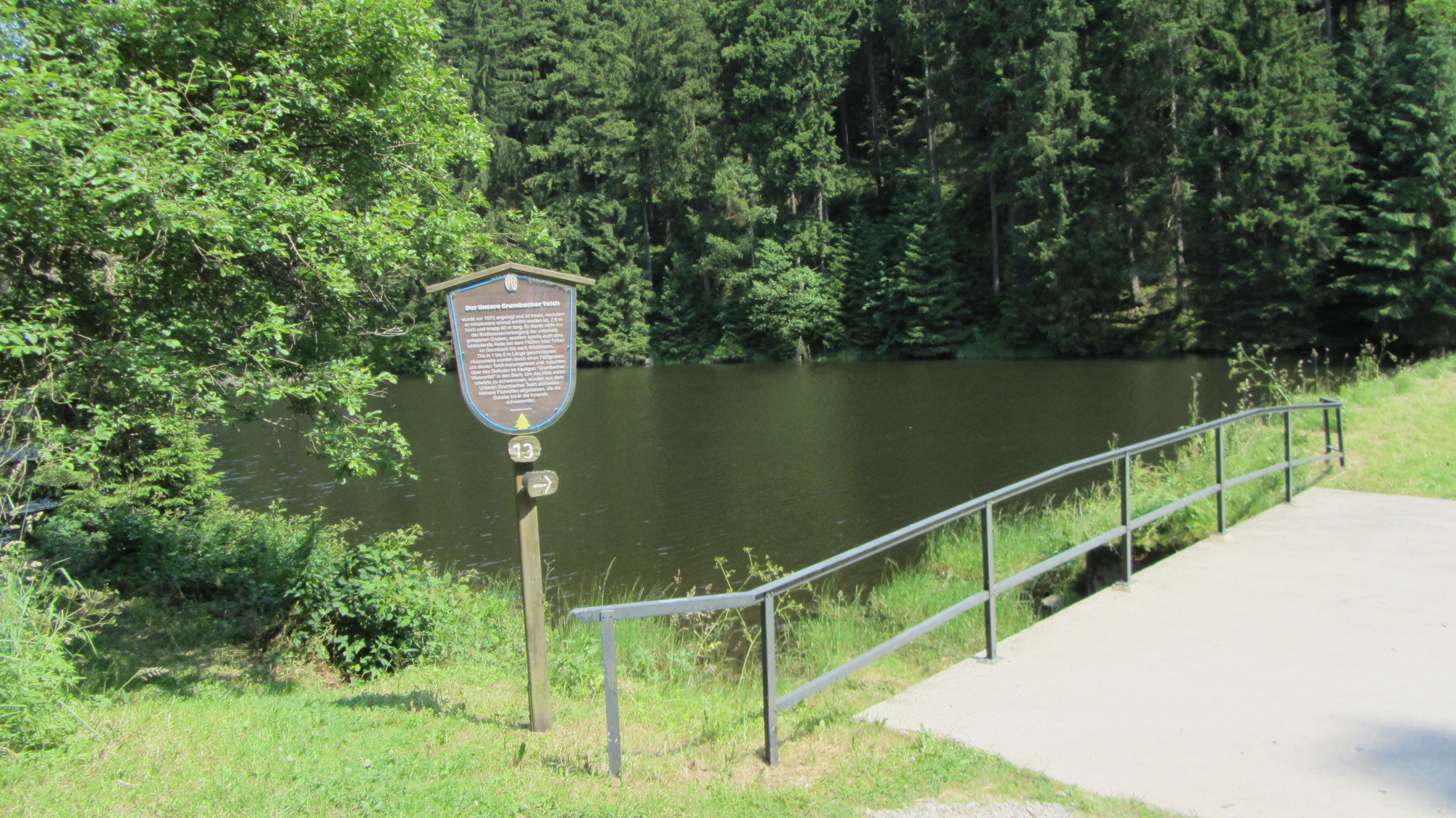
- Lower Grumbach Pond and information board
- Country: Germany
- Location: Between Hahnenklee and Wildemann, Goslar, Lower Saxony, Germany; Closest city: Clausthal-Zellerfeld
- Coordinates: 51.849727°N 10.300739°E
- Construction began: before 1673

Dam and spillways
- Type of dam: Stone
- Height: 7.52 m

Reservoir
- Total capacity: 82000 cu m
- Surface area: 7.92 km²

The Lower Grumbach Pond (German: Unterer Grumbacher Teich), usually just Grumbach Pond (Grumbacher Teich), is an old mining reservoir or Kunstteich between Hahnenklee and Wildemann in the Upper Harz mountains in Germany

It is one of the Upper Harz Ponds and was constructed before 1673. After being raised in height at least once, the dam today is 7.5 metres high and just under 60 metres long.

There are nine other ponds within its catchment area, all part of the Upper Harz Water Regale: the Kranicher Teichen, the Kuttelbacher Teich, the Auerhahnteich, the Upper (Oberer) and Middle (Mittlerer) Grumbach Ponds and the Upper and Lower (Oberer and Unterer) Flößteich. Its catchment area is 7.92 km² which is very large for an Upper Harz Pond and results in a high volumetric flow. Its impoundment capacity is 82,000 m³.

The pond was not only used for generating hydropower for the pits beneath, but also played an important role in timber rafting on the Grumbach stream to Wildemann. The timber, cut into one to two metre-long logs, was led by a rafting ditch around the pond and slid down the Gefluder in the present day Grumbach Waterfall into the stream. In order to transport the wood further downstream, water was periodically released from the Lower Grumbach Pond which ferried the logs down to the River Innerste.

By the Lower Grumbach Pond is a refuge hut with checkpoint no. 113 "Grumbacher Teich" on the Harzer Wandernadel hiking network.

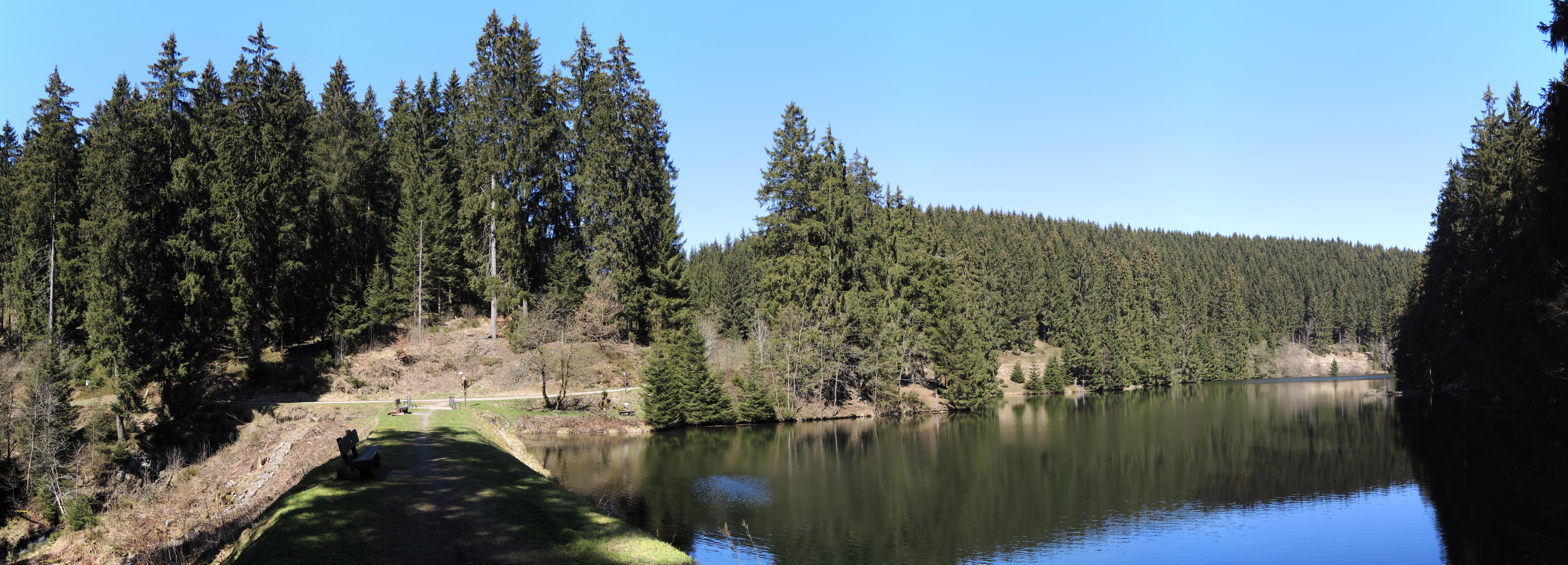
Panorama with the dam

== See also ==
- Upper Harz Ponds
- List of lakes in Lower Saxony
