= Aufgeklärtes Glück Mine =

Mine in Germany

Coordinates: 51°48′24″N 10°43′36″E

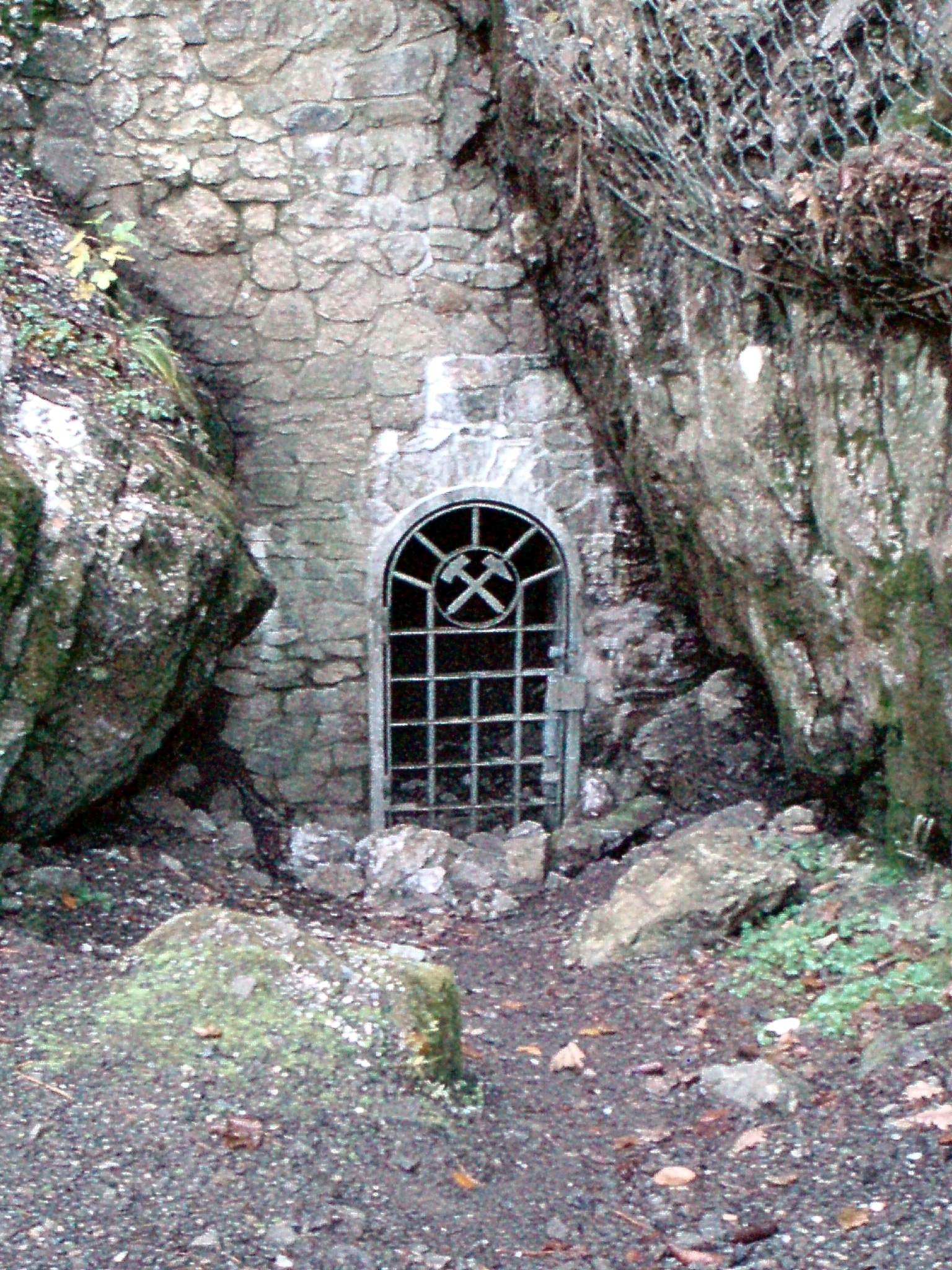
Old mine gallery entrance

The Aufgeklärtes Glück Mine (German: Bergwerk Aufgeklärtes Glück) is an old mine, now closed, in the valley of Thumkuhlental in the Harz Mountains of Germany. It lies southwest of Hasserode, a village on the edge of the town of Wernigerode in the state of Saxony-Anhalt. Nowadays, its exterior facilities form part of a nature and geological educational path that, thanks to the reconstruction of an old mine water management system (Wasserkunst), make a very graphic witness of the former mining activity at the foot of the Harz' highest mountain, the Brocken.

== History ==
The comital mining director (Bergrat), Dr Christoph Friedrich Jasche of Ilsenburg, was one of the first to investigate the mining past of this ore field. In 1846, he wrote:

Across the valleys of the Dränge and Dummkuhlen is a vein where cobalt ores occur and which has been the object of mining since olden times. Whether this activity was the reason why the blue colour works was built under the principle of mining freedom (Bergfreiheit) in Hasserode remains doubtful, but what is clear is that the mine was never profitable enough to fully supply cobalt ores to the blue colour works, as according to the evidence of the documents the necessary ores were in olden times, specifically in 1771, supplied mainly from Andreasberg, and formerly even from Bohemia. The abandoned pit is mentioned in old reports dating to the year 1728 under the name of Dumme Kuhle.

The name is derived from dummen, i.e. "unfruitful" and Kuhle, an old German word for "pit". In 1929, district judge (Amtsgerichtsrat) Walther Grosse, alternatively suggested that the name gave a clue that the Halberstadt chapter (Domstift) had once exercised mining jurisdiction (Bergrechte) here. This can be confirmed, because the bishop and the cathedral chapter (Domkapitel) of Halberstadt actually appeared in the Middle Ages as the most senior mining and liege lords of Hasserode. From 1343, the liege men were the counts of Wernigerode and so the first record of this pit, as the Dhumkuhlenbergk na den Huppeln, is found in an undated deed by Count Henry of Wernigerode who died in 1429

== Hiking ==
The Wasserkunst Thumkuhlental is checkpoint no. 85 in the Harzer Wandernadel hiking network.

== Literature ==
- Jörg Brückner (2002), ""Aufgeklärtes Glück" im Thumkuhlental. Aus den Aufzeichnungen von Bergrat Dr. Jaschke", Neue Wernigeröder Zeitung (in German), vol. 13, no. 21, p. 21
