= Elfenstein =

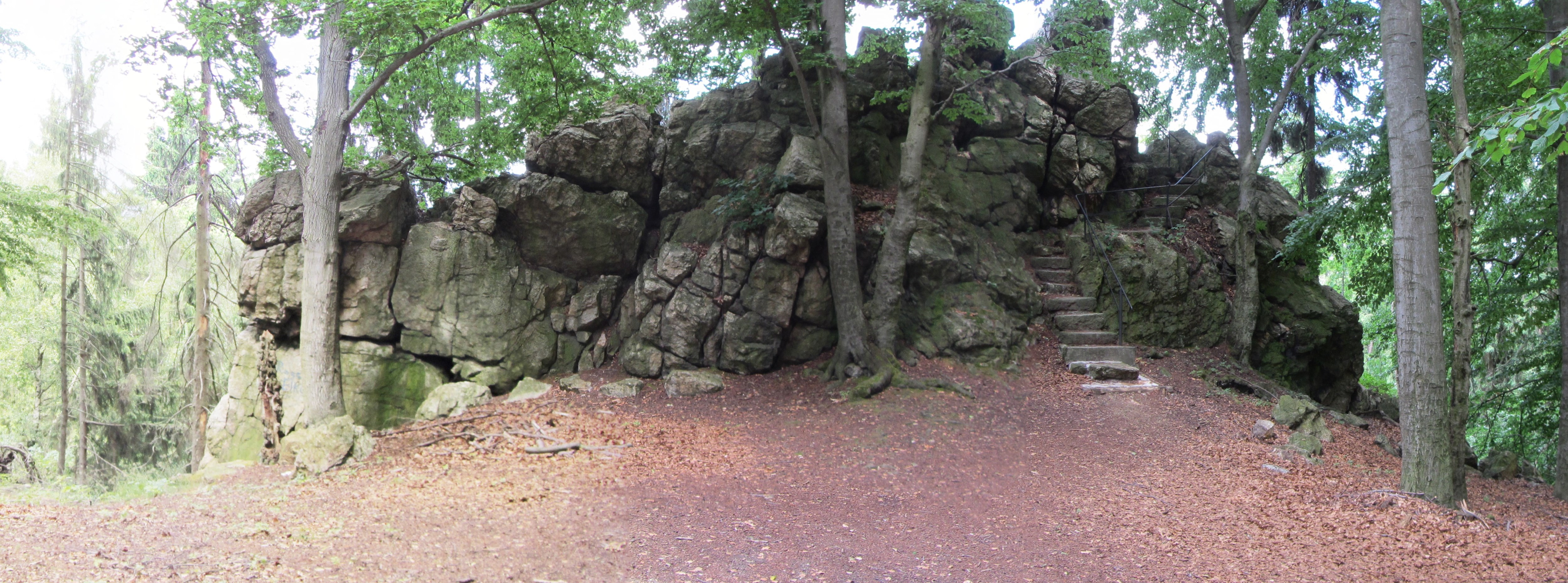

Highest point
- Elevation: 475 m above sea level (NN) (1,558 ft)
- Coordinates: 51°52′45″N 10°31′38″E

Geography
- Location within Lower Saxony
- Location: Bad Harzburg, Goslar county, Lower Saxony
- Parent range: Harz Mountains (Upper Harz)

The Elfenstein is a hill spur, about 475 m above sea level (NN), in the northern foothills of the Harz Mountains of central Germany and the site of the eponymous granite rock formation above the town of Bad Harzburg. It is located in the unincorporated area of Harz in the county of Goslar in the state of Lower Saxony.

== Location ==
The Elfenstein lies in the Upper Harz within the Harz Nature Park. It rises west of the town of Bad Harzburg and southwest of the village of Bündheim between the valley of the Gläsecke to the west and that of the Bleiche to the east.

== Description and history ==
On the hill is the granite rock formation also known as the Elfenstein (ca. 420 m above NN), which was first mentioned in the records in 1578 as Elwenstein. In the Middle Ages the rocks were seen as a dwelling place for elves and similar creatures.

Excavations in the area indicate that it has been settled in the Bronze Age. On the northeastern slope of the wooded hill, near the way between the Bleichebach and the old Silberborn, in 1857 an old Germanic dwelling and gravesite were discovered.

== Views and walks ==
The Elfenstein rocks, which may be climbed by means of steps, are no. 120 in the system of checkpoints in the Harzer Wandernadel hiking network. From the top there are views of Bad Harzburg and the northern Harz Foreland.
