= Regenstein Mill =

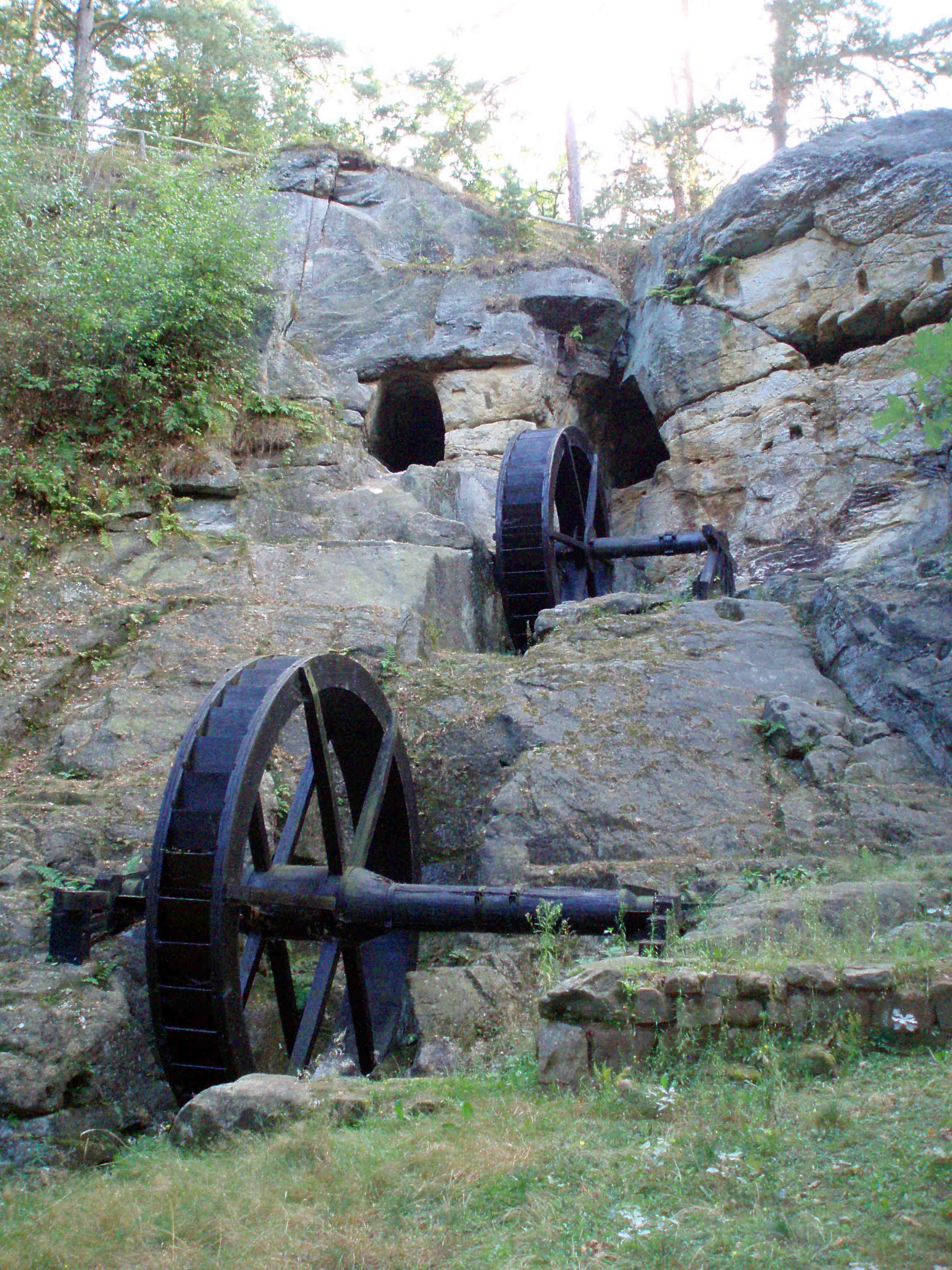
Site of the old mill

The Regenstein Mill (German: Regensteinmühle) was a water-powered corn and oil mill below Regenstein Castle north of the town of Blankenburg (Harz) in the county of Harz (Saxony-Anhalt).

== History and description ==
The mill was built in the first half of the 12th century in order to supply the castle and its outlying estate of Nienrode. The overshot water for the mill wheels was fed by means of a mill channel, just under 2 kilometres long, from the Goldbach stream below the pond of Mönchemühleteich.

Between 1988 and 1991, work was carried out to uncover this channel over a length of about 500 metres.

The Regenstein Mill was in operation until the end of the Middle Ages and then increasingly fell into rack and ruin. In 1758, during the Seven Years' War, the remains of the mill were demolished by the Prussians for strategic reasons as it lay close to the border between Brunswick and Prussia.

Around 1990 the two mill wheels were reconstructed.

== Hiking ==
Regenstein is the only mill in the Harzer Wandernadel hiking network and is checkpoint no. 82. A few metres away from the replica mill wheels is a hiker's refuge hut.
