= Jagdkopf (Zorge) =

- Location within Lower Saxony

Highest point
- Elevation: 603.1 m above sea level (NN) (1,979 ft)
- Coordinates: 51°38′02″N 10°36′24″E

Geography
- Location: between Wieda and Zorge, Göttingen district, Lower Saxony, Germany
- Parent range: Harz Mountains (South Harz)

The Jagdkopf is a hill, 603.1 m above sea level (NN), in the Harz Mountains of Germany. It is located between the villages of Wieda and Zorge in the unincorporated area of Harz in the district of Göttingen in the state of Lower Saxony.

== Hiking ==
A section of the Kaiser Way runs over the western side of the Jagdkopf between the refuge huts of Helenenruh (51°38′32.6″N 10°36′38.5″E), which is no. 160 in the Harzer Wandernadel system of hiking checkpoints, to the north, and the Bremer Hütte (51°37′56.4″N 10°36′16.4″E) to the south. About 250 metres from this hiking trail is the rock formation of Bremer Klippe, which is checkpoint no. 163; the box is located at the Bremer Hütte ("Bremen Hut"). After a short, steep climb from the Kaiser Way there is a view from the rocks of the village of Wieda and beyond to the west-southwest towards the mountain of Ravensberg (ca. 659 m above NN).
