= Mönchsbuche =

Beech tree in the Harz Mountains of Germany

Coordinates: 51°49′05″N 10°42′29″E

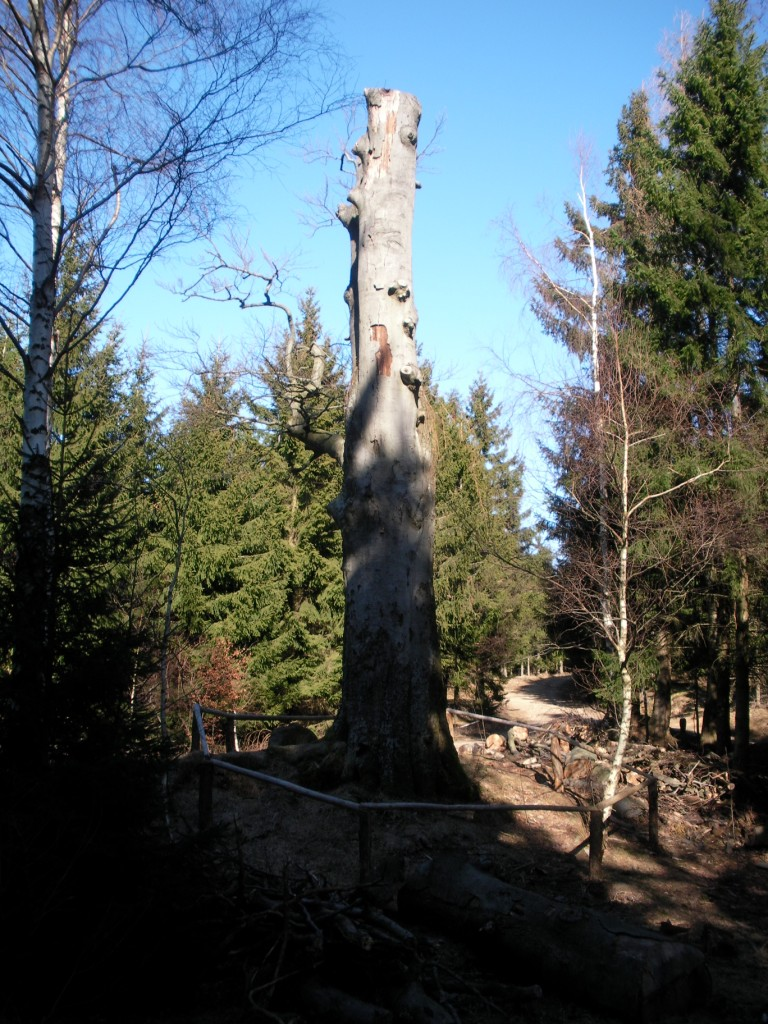
The Mönchsbuche

The Mönchsbuche is an old beech tree in the Harz Mountains of Germany that has been designated as a natural monument due to its age and the stories surrounding it. It stands on a ridge near Hasserode in the borough of Wernigerode, on an old way between the abbeys of Himmelpforten and Ilsenburg and is reputedly where the monks used to stop and rest. In March 2011 the top of the old tree, that is over 100 years old, was removed in order to save it from breaking apart.

The Mönchsbuche is a landmark and also checkpoint no. 26 in the Harzer Wandernadel hiking network. Below the Mönchsbuche is the well known as the Wernigeröder Bürgerbrunnen.
