= Froschfelsen =

Natural monument in Germany

Coordinates: 51°51′3″N 10°39′23″E

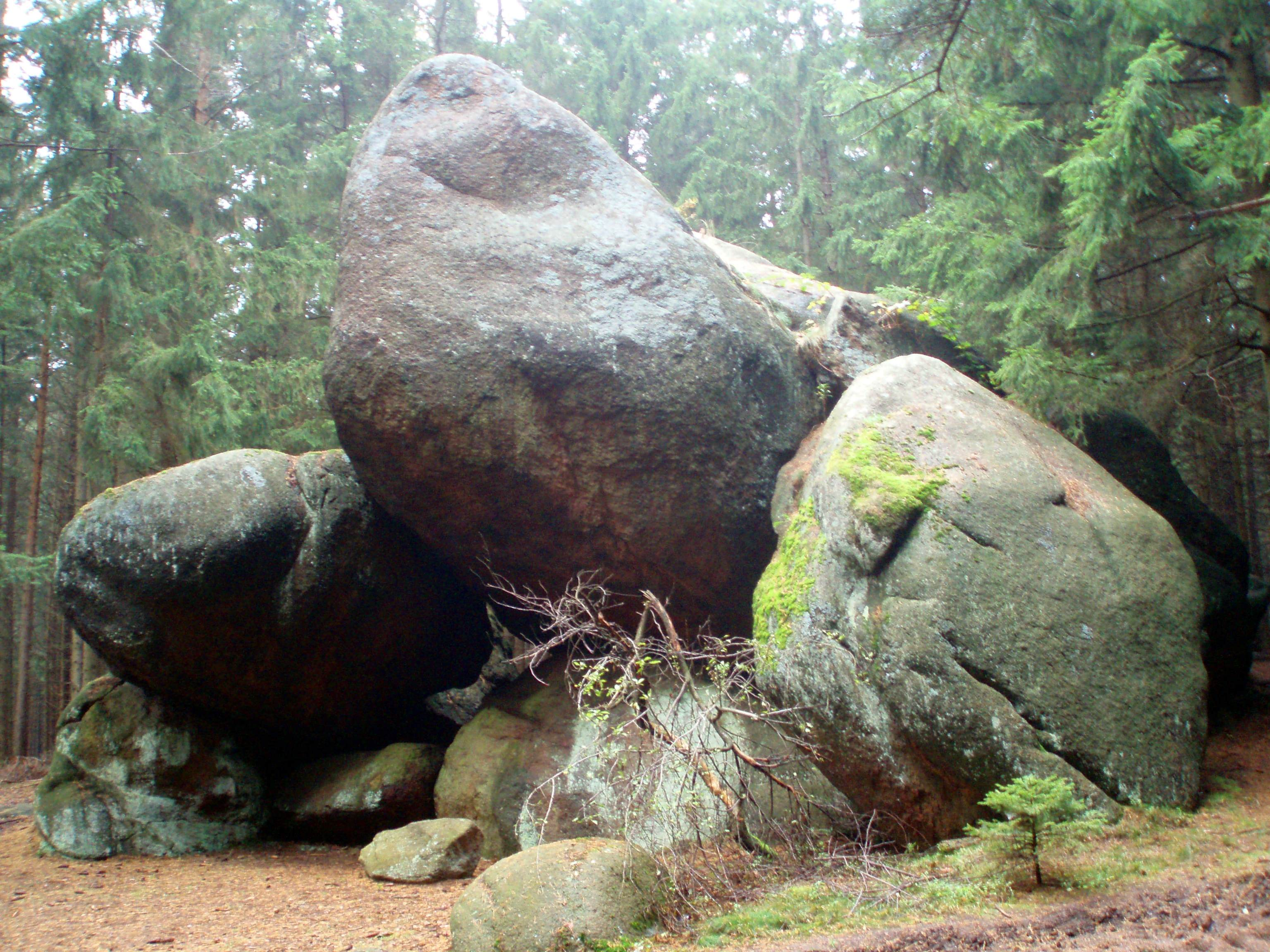
The Froschfelsen near Ilsenburg

The Froschfelsen ("Frog Rocks", 545 m above NN), also called the Froschsteinklippe, is a natural monument near Ilsenburg in the northern Harz in central Germany. It is a formation of granite rocks that take the shape of a frog, hence the name.

The Froschfelsen is located on the Meineberg hill on the western side of the Ilse valley. It is a hiking destination and No. 5 in the system of checkpoints in the Harzer Wandernadel hiking network. The checkpoint is in a nearby refuge hut.
