= Christianental =

Side valley in Germany

Coordinates: 51°49′35″N 10°48′28″E

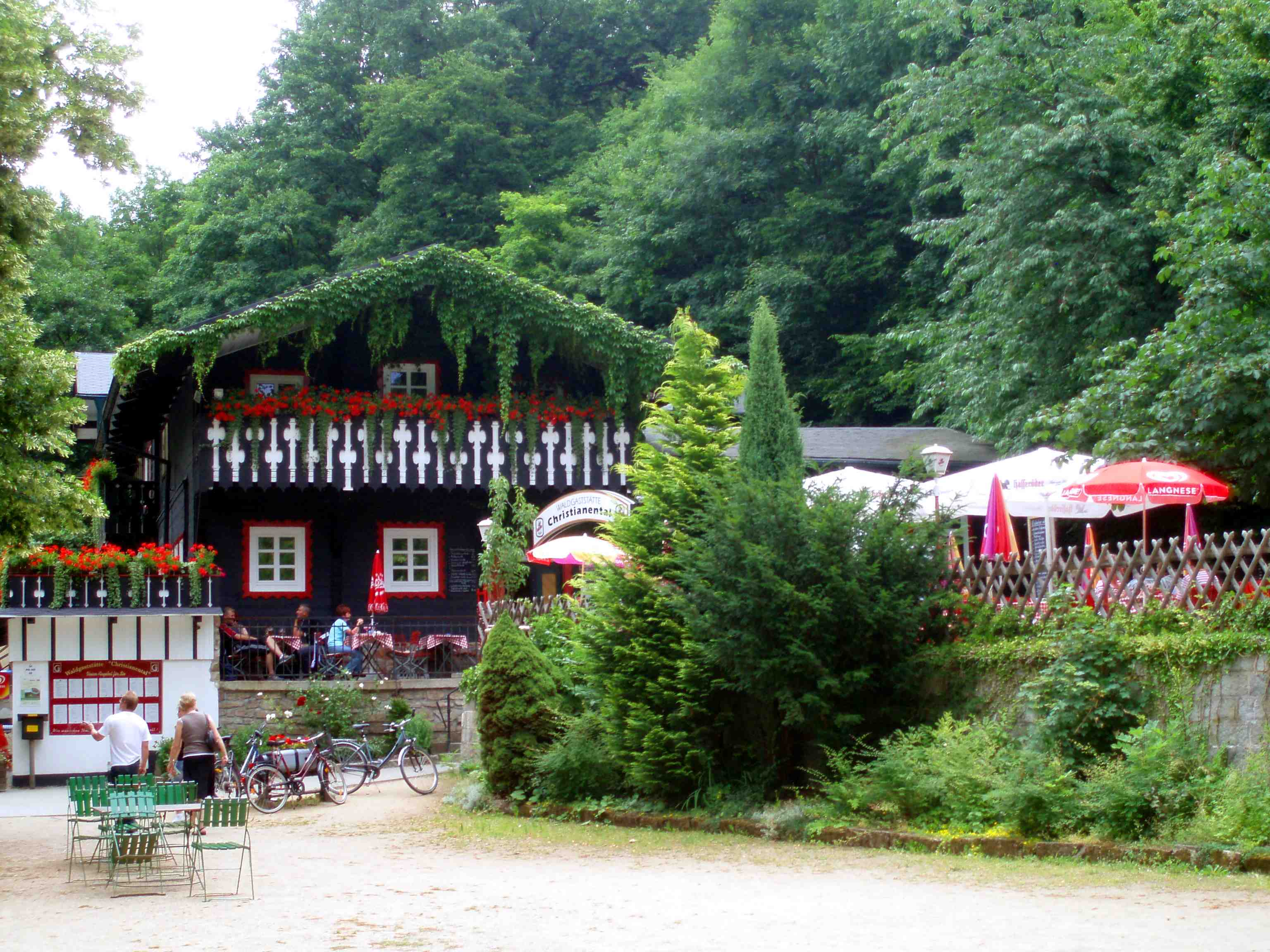
In the Christianental

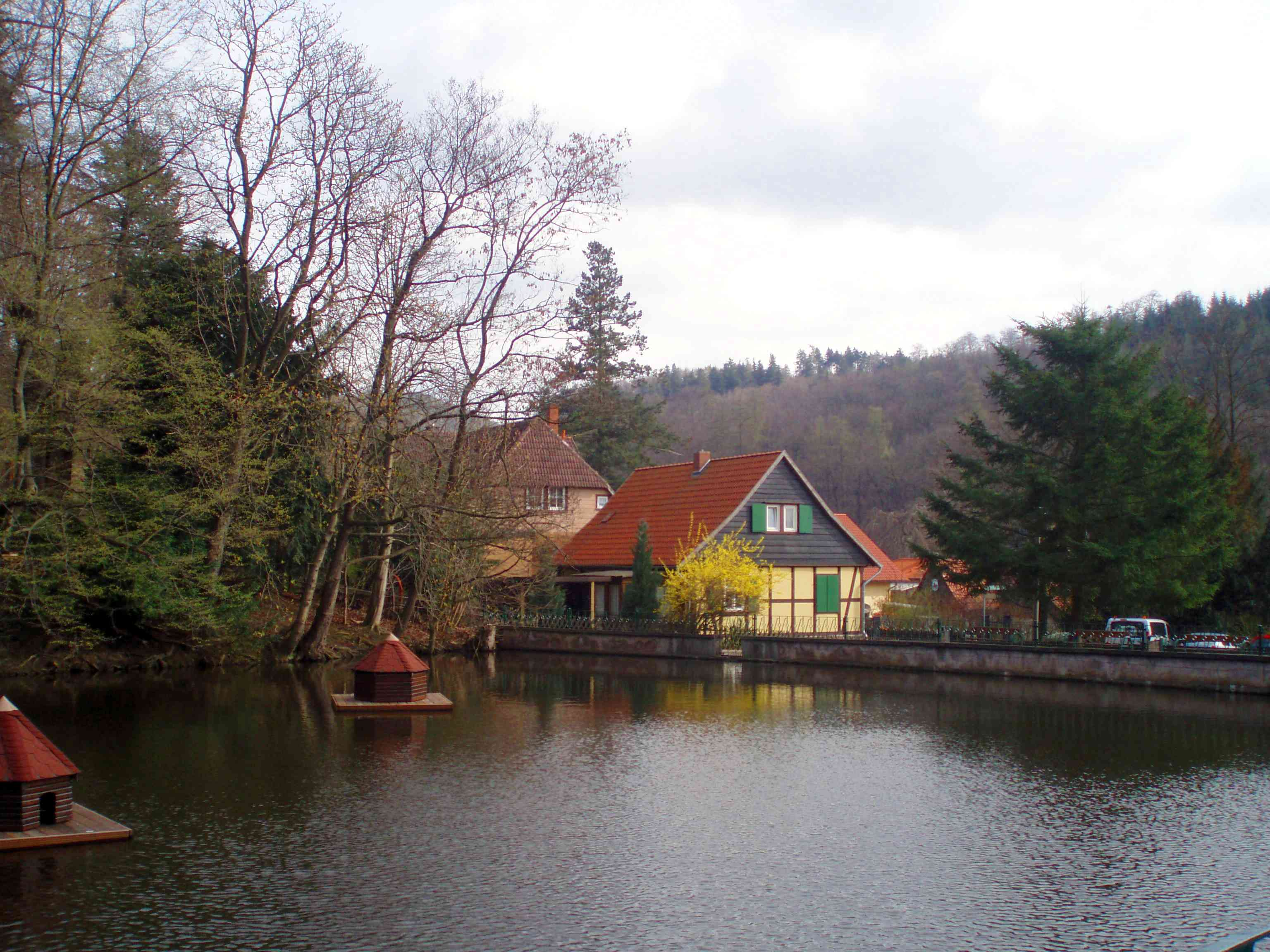
Forester's lodge in the Christianental

The Christianental is a side valley of the Mühlental in the borough of Wernigerode in the Harz Mountains of central Germany. It lies between the Agnesberg, the hill on which Wernigerode Castle stands, and the Fenstermacherberg. The Christianental is known countrywide for its wildlife park, the forest restaurant at the head of the valley along with the indoor shooting range (Schützenhaus) and the master fisherman's house (Fischmeisterhaus) and neighbouring forester's lodge at the bottom of the valley. The latter was featured in the title of the novel Das Forsthaus im Christianental by Käthe Papke.

The Christianental inn and the Agnesberg are checkpoint nos. 31 and 32 in the Harzer Wandernadel hiking network. Between the inn and the indoor range there is a monument to the county highways inspector (Kreiswegemeister), Otto Plachta.

== History ==
Until the 18th century the Christianental was called the Tillental or Dillenthal. It belonged to the wildlife park of the counts of Stolberg and was named after the ruling count, Christian Ernest of Stolberg-Wernigerode. By around 1800 the so-called Jennyhaus was built here. It was followed by a log cabin in the Tyrolean style, in which the zookeeper lived. As a secondary income this place put up visitors during the summer. From that emerged the present forest restaurant.
