= Heibeeksköpfe =

- Location within Lower Saxony

Highest point
- Elevation: 465.2 m above sea level (NN) (1,526 ft)
- Coordinates: 51°38′20″N 10°27′05″E

Naming
- Native name: Großer Heibeekskopf / Kleiner Heibeekskopf (German)

Geography
- Location: nahe Bad Lauterberg, Landkreis Göttingen, Lower Saxony
- Parent range: Harz (Südharz)

The Heibeeksköpfe in the Harz Mountains of central Germany are a double summit with a maximum height of 465.2 m above sea level (NN), near Bad Lauterberg in the unincorporated area of Harz in the district of Göttingen in Lower Saxony.

== Location ==
The Heibeeksköpfe rise in the South Harz in the Harz Nature Park about 1.5 km (as the crow flies) north-northwest of the railway station at Bad Lauterberg. They separate the Lutter tributary of Heibeek, after which they are named, to the west and south, from the Lutter to the east. Their two summits – the Großer (465.2 m) and Kleiner Heibeekskopf (440.1 m) – are oriented north-to-south and are about 460 metres apart. On the eastern flank of both peaks is the Augenquelle spring that drains into the Lutter.

== Hiking ==
Just 800 metres northwest of the Großer Heibeekskopf and thus in the direction of the Scheffeltalsköpfe lies the crosstracks of Knollenkreuz (ca. 480 m above NN; 51°38′36.2″N 10°26′33″E), which is checkpoint no. 152 in the Harzer Wandernadel hiking network; the checkpoint box is located right next to the refuge hut called the Hentschelköte. The crossing is on the footpath from Bad Lauterberg to the highest mountain in the South Harz, the Großer Knollen.
