= Jägersbleeker Teich =

Coordinates: 51°47′50″N 10°23′11″E

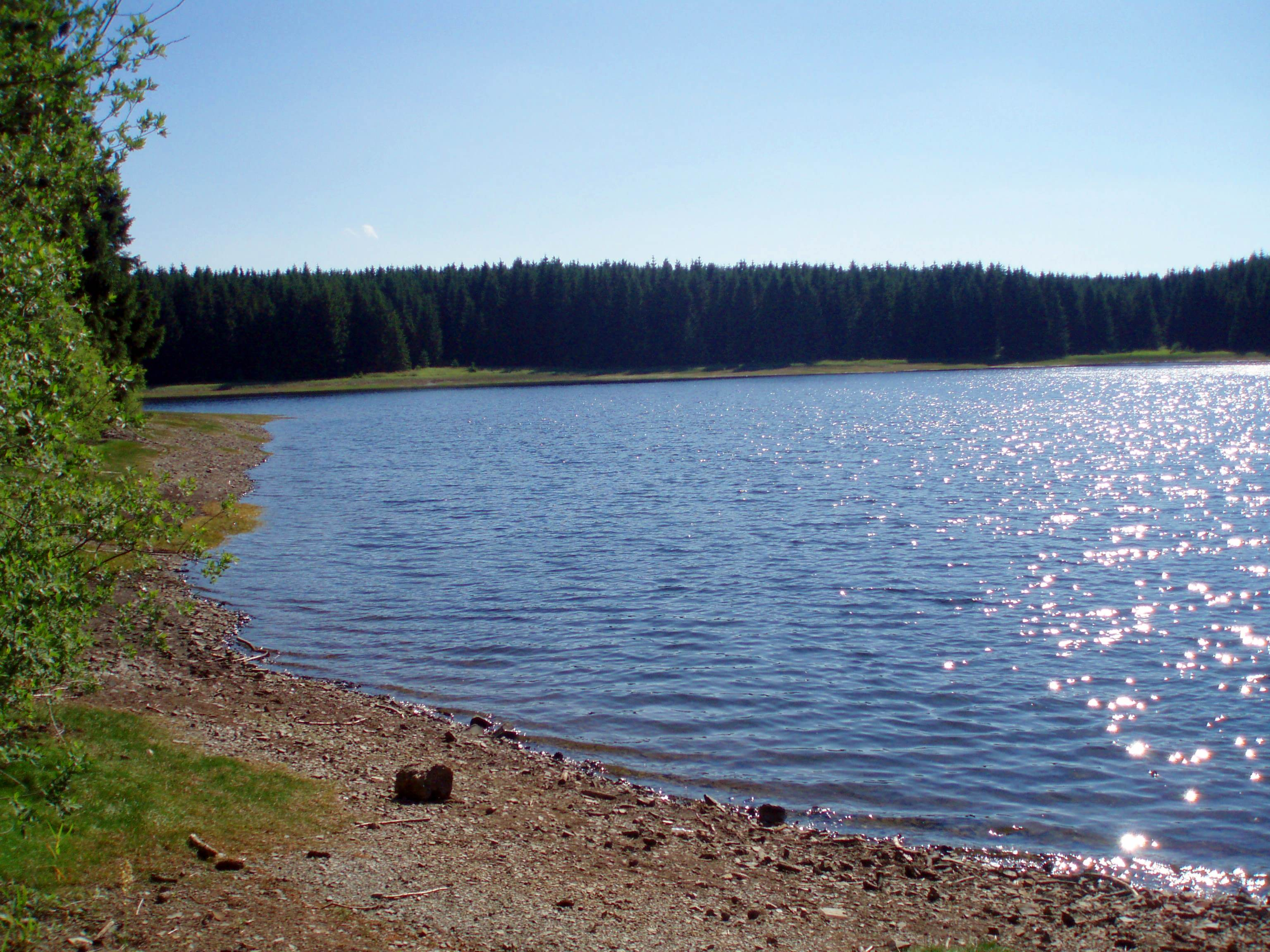
At the Jägersbleeker Teich

The Jägersbleeker Teich in the Harz Mountains of central Germany is a storage pond near the town of Clausthal-Zellerfeld in the county of Goslar in Lower Saxony. It is one of the Upper Harz Ponds that were created for the mining industry.

The reservoir lies in the Upper Harz within the Harz Nature Park. It is located around 3.5 km east-southeast of the quarter of Clausthal. Its water surface lies at 586.5 m above sea level (NN), it has a retention capacity of 380,000 m³ and its dam is 13.65 m high. A little below the Jägersbleeker Teich is another pond, the Fortuner Teich.

The history of the Jägersbleeker Teich goes back to around 1670.

Near the southeastern end of the dam is a refuge hut for hikers named after the forestry official (Forstamtmann), August Weppner, called the August Weppner Hut, inside which is checkpoint no. 127, Weppner Hütte, Jägersbleeker Teich, of the Harzer Wandernadel hiking network.
