= Sandhöhlen =

Sand caves in Saxony-Anhalt, Germany

Coordinates: 51°49′00″N 10°58′01″E

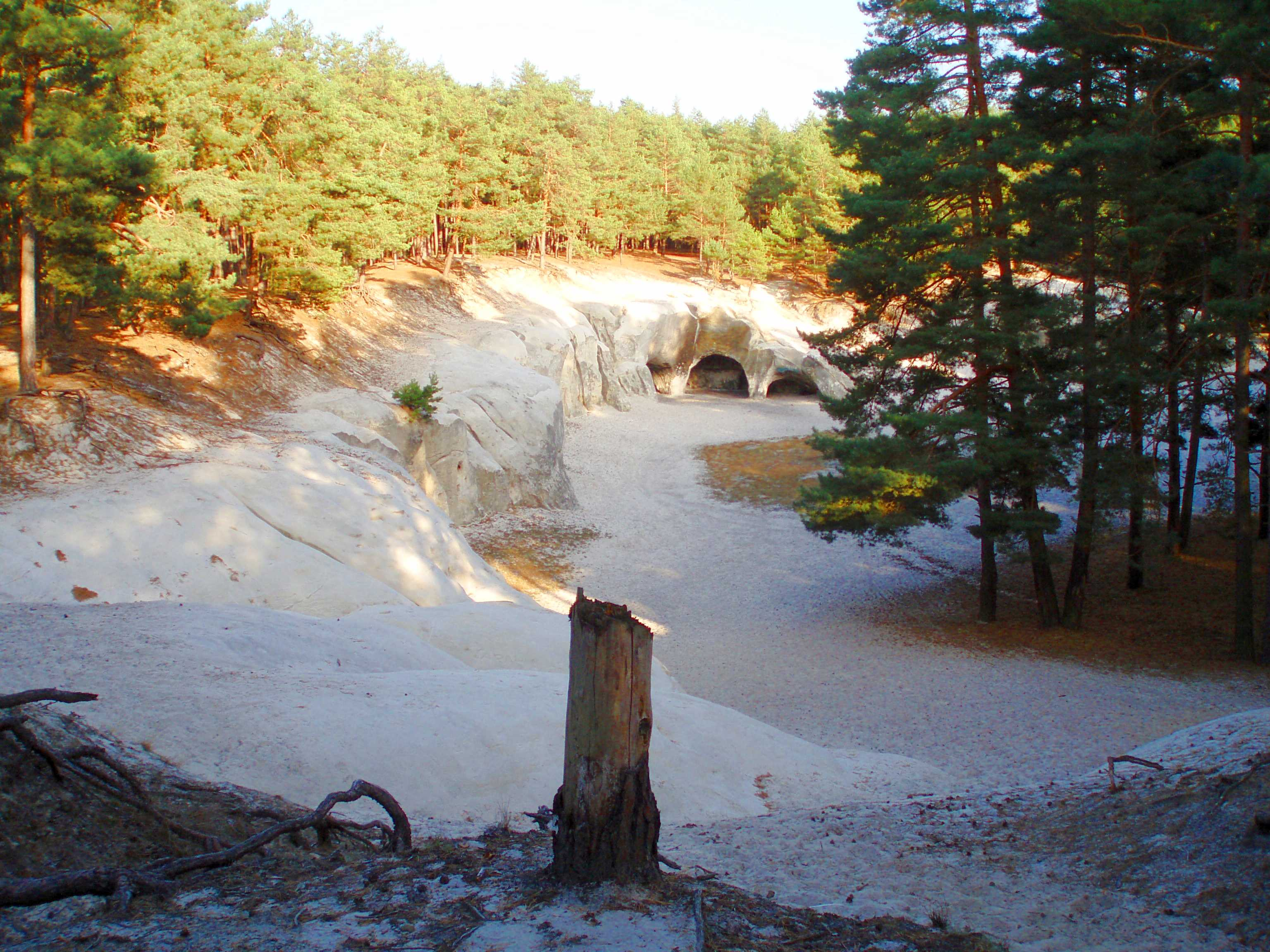
Sandhöhlen im Heers

The Sandhöhlen are a natural monument in the German state of Saxony-Anhalt. They are two sand caves known individually as the Große Sandhöhle and Kleine Sandhöhle ("Great Sand Cave" and "Small Sand Cave"). The caves are located in a wooded area called im Heers below the fortress and crags of Regenstein north of the town of Blankenburg (Harz). It is surmised that a Germanic thingstead was held here in protohistoric times. On the Große Sandhöhle is a checkpoint (no. 81) in the Harzer Wandernadel hiking network which was voted by hikers as the most beautiful checkpoint of the year in 2009.
