= Wilhelmsblick =

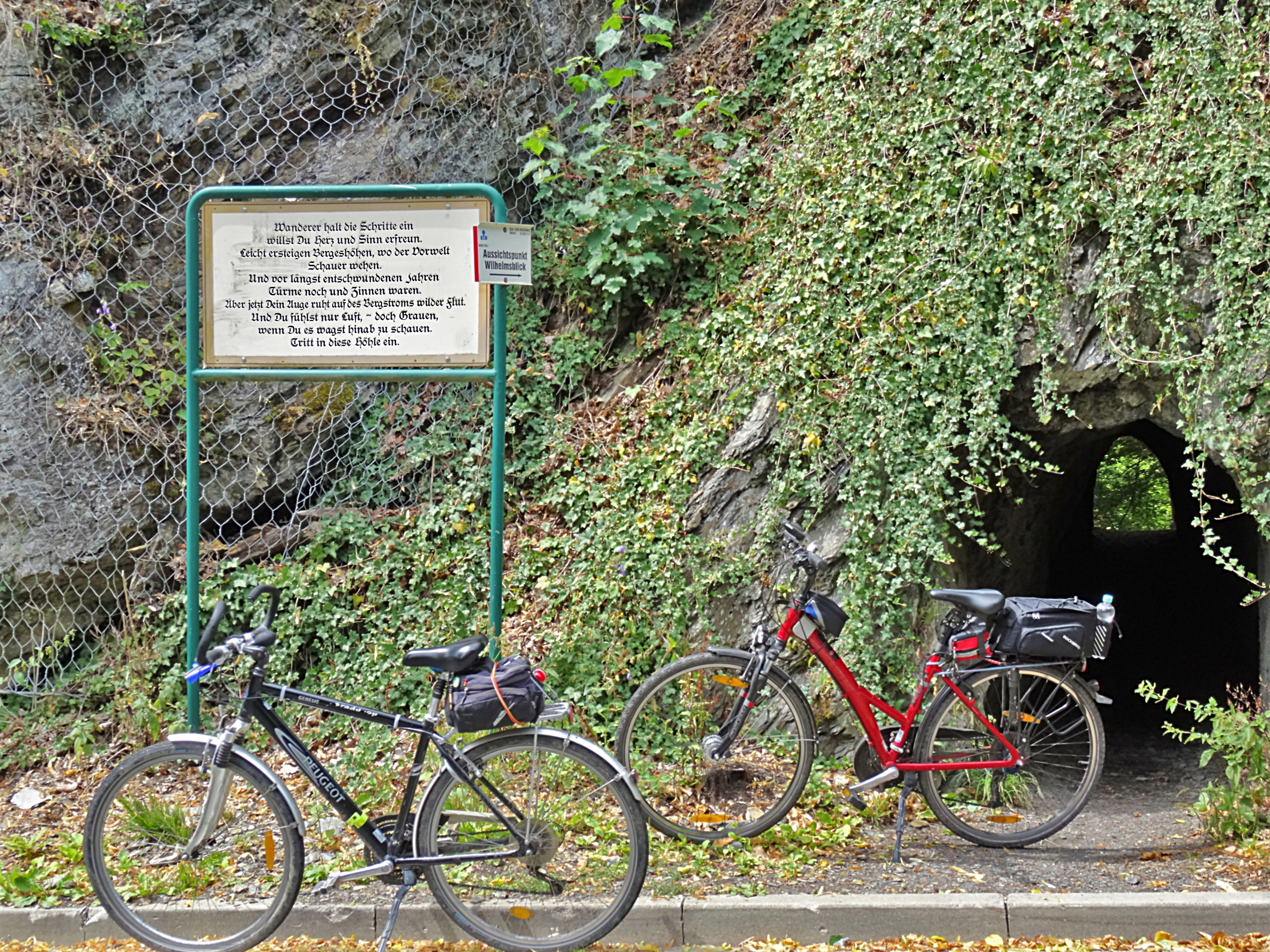
Entrance to the Wilhelmsblick

The Wilhelmsblick in the Harz Mountains of central Germany is a viewing point near the village of Treseburg in the Bode Gorge in the county of Harz, Saxony-Anhalt. From this single point, four different stretches of the River Bode may be seen as it swings in great loops around the spur on which the viewing point is located.

== Location ==
The Wilhelmsblick lies within the Harz/Saxony-Anhalt Nature Park about 1,000 metres (as the crow flies) north-northwest of the junction of the Landesstraße 94 (Altenbrak–Treseburg) and the L 93 (Allrode–Treseburg–Wienrode) in Treseburg, the last-named road being linked to Thale via the nearby Kreisstraße 1350. The actual viewing point is located west of the L 93 on a narrow ridge, passed on both sides by the River Bode, at a height of 314 m above sea level (NN). The Bode swings in a tight loop around the spur at a height of 273.7 m above NN at the bridge on the L 94 just southwest of the viewing point and a height of 256.7 m above NN a little northeast of the viewing point in a loop. The stretches of river either side of the ridge come within just 150 m of one another. The Wilhelmsblick is no. 66 in the system of checkpoints in the Harzer Wandernadel hiking network.
