= Ostlandkreuz =

Memorial crosses

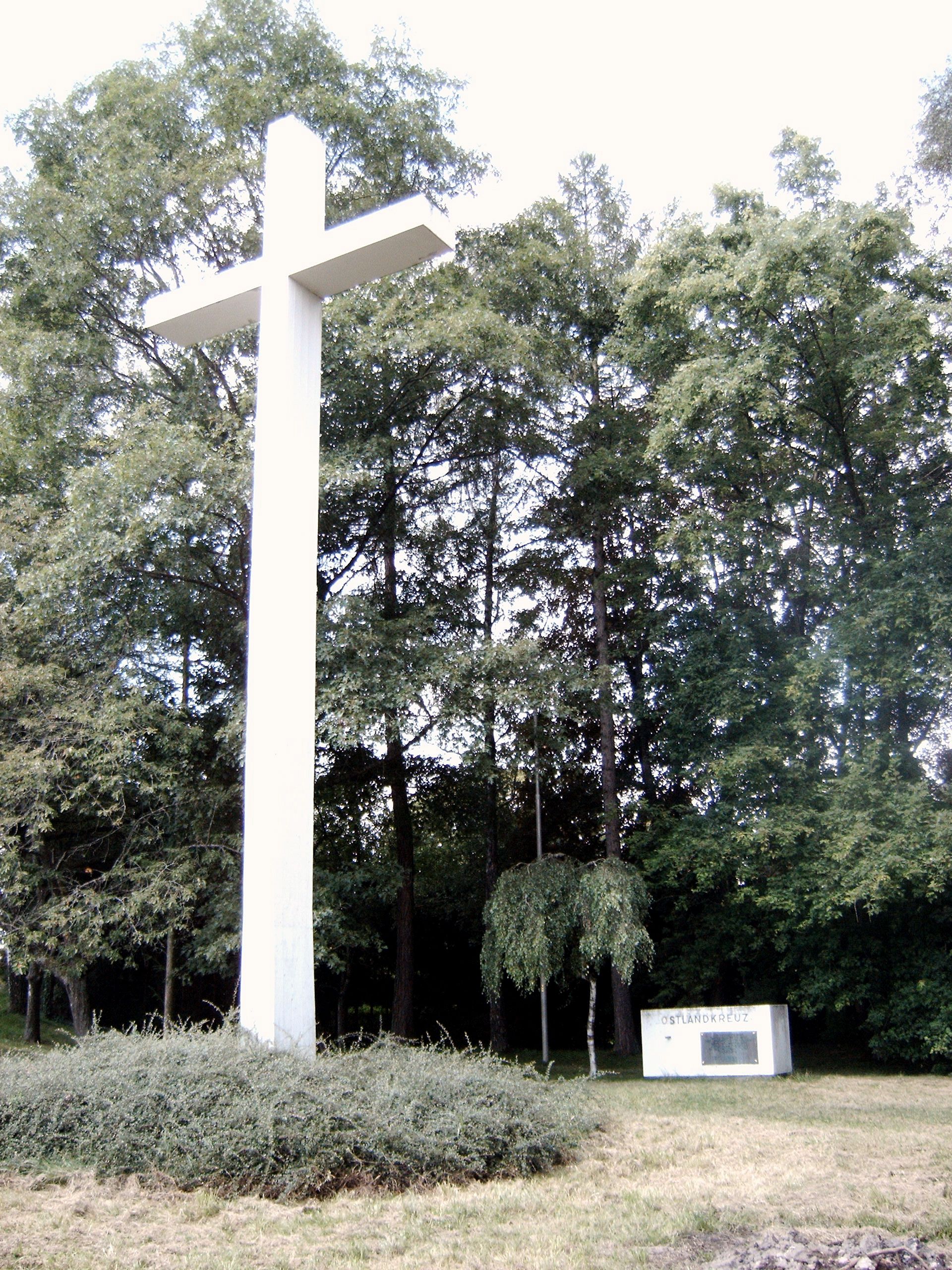
Cross between Winterbach and Schorndorf

Ostlandkreuz (German for "Eastern Lands Cross") or Kreuz des deutschen Ostens ("Cross of the German East") is the name of memorial crosses in Germany remembering the large-scale Ethnic cleansing of Central and Eastern Europe of its German-speaking population. After border shifts and population transfers agreed at the Potsdam Conference, German-speakers were expelled from the former Sudetenland areas of Czechoslovakia, from the Former eastern territories of Germany annexed by Poland and the Soviet part of the former Province of East Prussia. While most of these crosses stand in cemeteries, some are erected as landmarks on mountains.

== Locations ==
In Germany there are several hundred Ostlandkreuze, most of which are located in cemeteries. The following list is restricted to the most prominent Ostlandkreuze erected on exposed locations.

=== Bad Harzburg ===
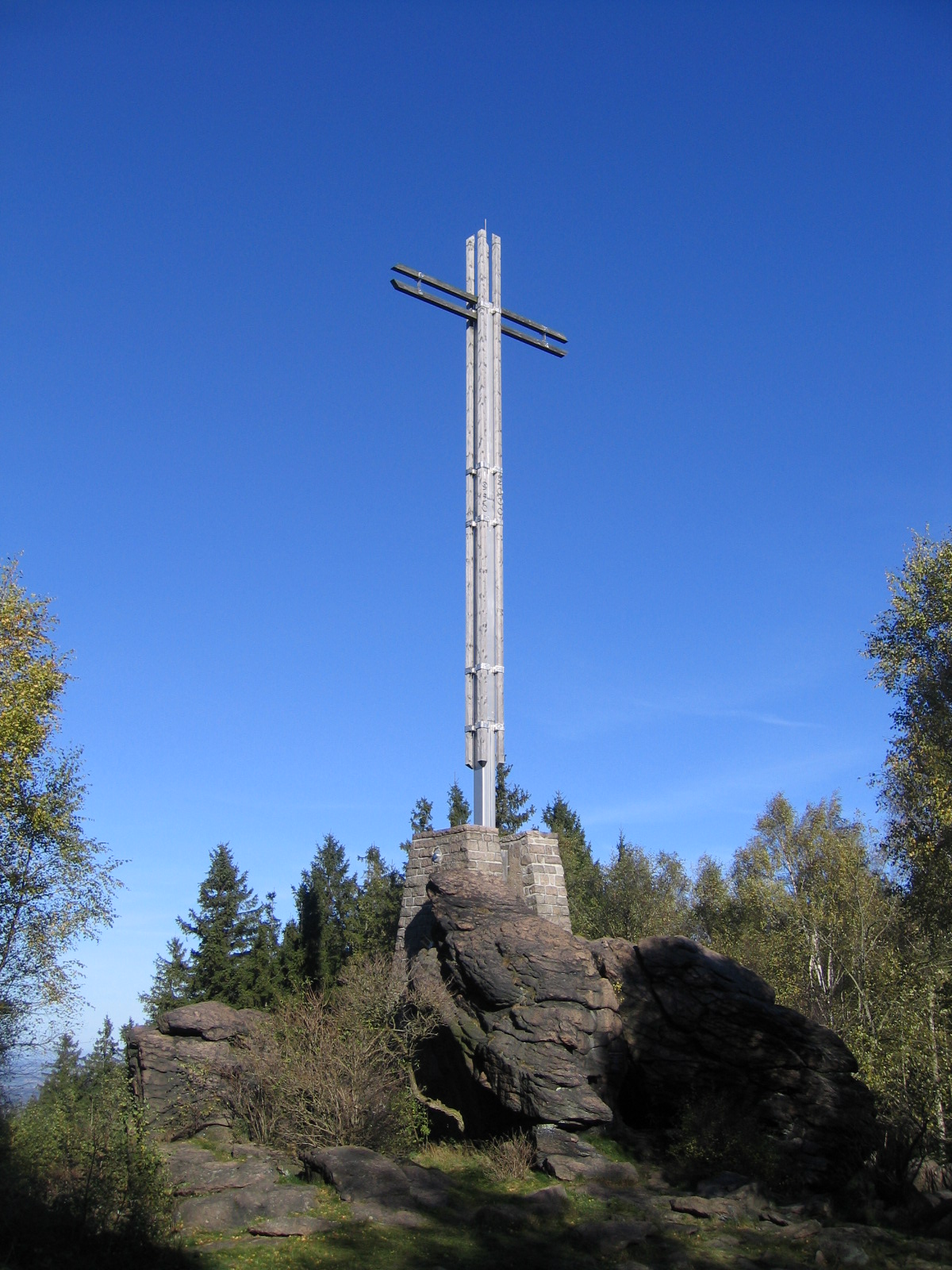
Cross near Bad Harzburg

On 24 June 1950 a 20.5-metre-high (67 ft), wooden cross, the Kreuz des Deutschen Ostens, was dedicated on the Uhlenklippen crags near Bad Harzburg in the presence of Ernst Reuter. This cross stood for over 47 years before being blown down on 4 March 1998 during a hurricane. On 30 September 2000 a new 17.7-metre-high (58 ft) and 6.3-metre-wide (21 ft), partly wooden-clad, steel cross was dedicated on the same spot. The construction cost came to 180,000 DM. Around the cross in a wide arc is a footpath on the outside of which are small rough-hewn stone monuments facing the cross; each one with a shield representing one of the former German provinces in Central Europe, east to its modern border. The cross is checkpoint no. 122 on the Harzer Wandernadel hiking network.

=== Geislingen ===
The Geislingen Ostlandkreuz is a memorial cross built in 1950 south of Geislingen, on the Schildwacht mountain. It remembers specifically the expulsions from the South Moravian Region in and around the towns of Znojmo, Mikulov, Nová Bystřice and Slavonice.

It is a steel framework construction covered with copper plates. Its height is 22.7m/74.5ft and it weighs 8.5 tons. The span of its arms is 7.5m/24.5ft. A landmark of Geislingen, the cross was renovated in 1992, further refurbished in 2003 and received a light installation for illumination at night.

Coordinates: 48°36′57″N 9°49′51″E

=== Nordstemmen ===
The wooden "Cross of the German East" (Kreuz des deutschen Ostens) was erected in 1961 on the Bocksberg near the village of Heyersum. After being destroyed it was newly consecrated in 1990 and 2006.

=== Winterbach ===
The cross and an altar, both made of concrete, are located on the Hungerberg, a slope on the northern edge of the Rems valley between Winterbach and Schorndorf.

Once a year around 5:30 am on Easter morning there is a service at this Ostlandkreuz.

Coordinates: 48°48′34.3″N 9°29′49.2″E

=== Dülken ===
In the town of Dülken (Viersen district) a cross in memory of the war and German refugees was erected at the cemetery in 1951. It was restored in 2005.

== See also ==
- Germans in Czechoslovakia (1918-1938)
- Flight and expulsion of Germans (1944–1950)
