= Sorge Border Museum =

Coordinates: 51°41′42″N 10°41′09″E

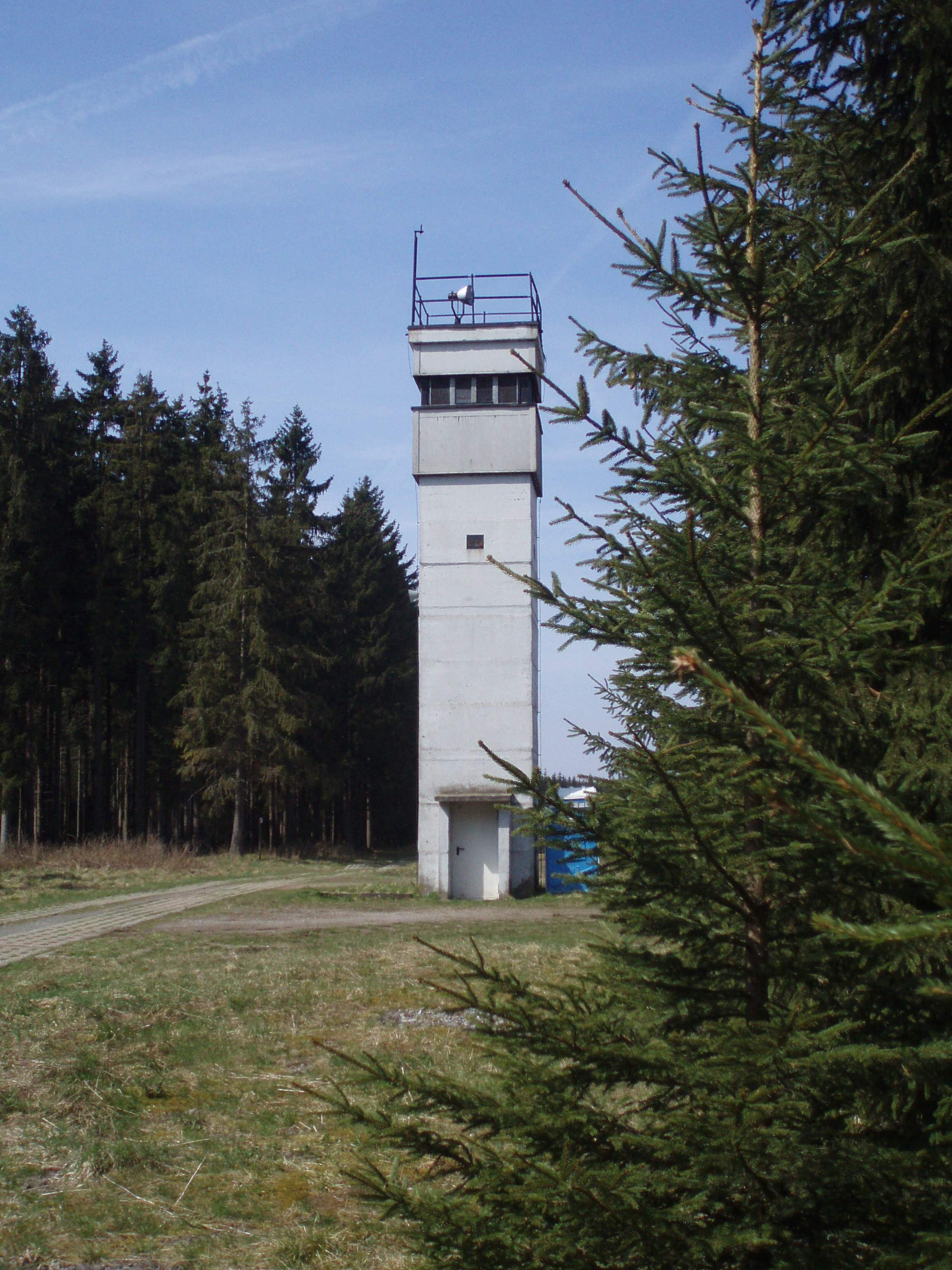
B Tower near Sorge

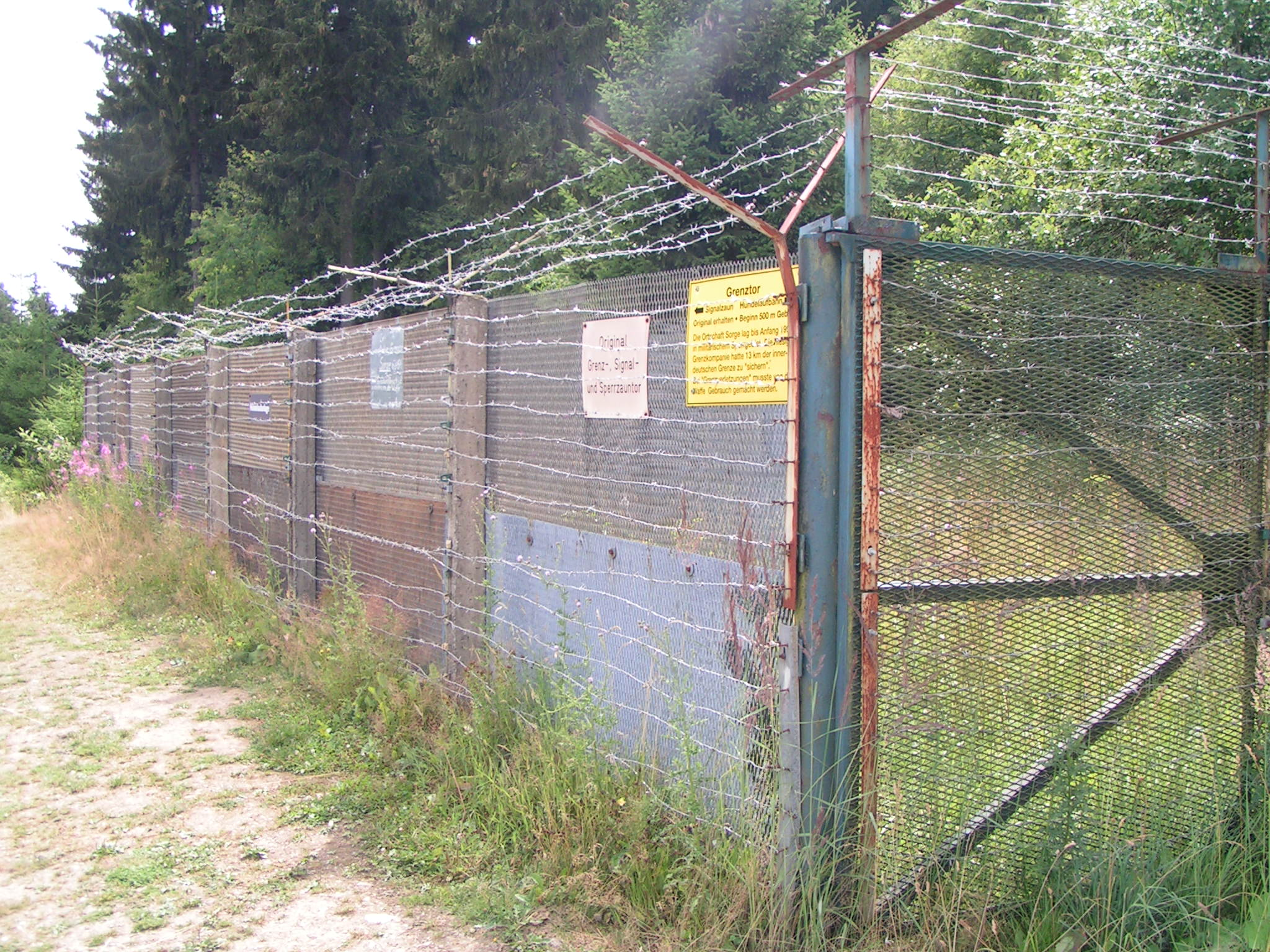
Border fence

The Sorge Border Museum (German: Grenzmuseum Sorge, 511 m above sea level (NN)) is an open-air museum that is open to the public free of charge near Sorge in the Harz Mountains of central Germany. It is located immediately by the former Inner German Border, southeast of Braunlage and aims to recall the division of Germany into East and West Germany.

In the border museum, elements of the original East German border may be seen, including a section of border fence, the dog runs, parts of the signal fence and the patrol road made of concrete slabs, a watchtower (a so-called B Tower), and an East German border post.

Immediately on the state border between Saxony-Anhalt and Lower Saxony is the "Ring of Commemoration" (Ring der Erinnerungen), which was created by the environmental and landscape artist, Herman Prigann, in the 1990s. Made of dead wood, the artist has created a large ring based on the concept of a witches' circle. Many birds roost in the dead hedge so formed.

The museum is run by the society of the same name (Grenzmuseum Sorge) and, since 2006, has been checkpoint no. 46 in the system of checkpoints of the Harzer Wandernadel hiking network.
