= Maaßener Gaipel =

Pub in Lautenthal, Germany

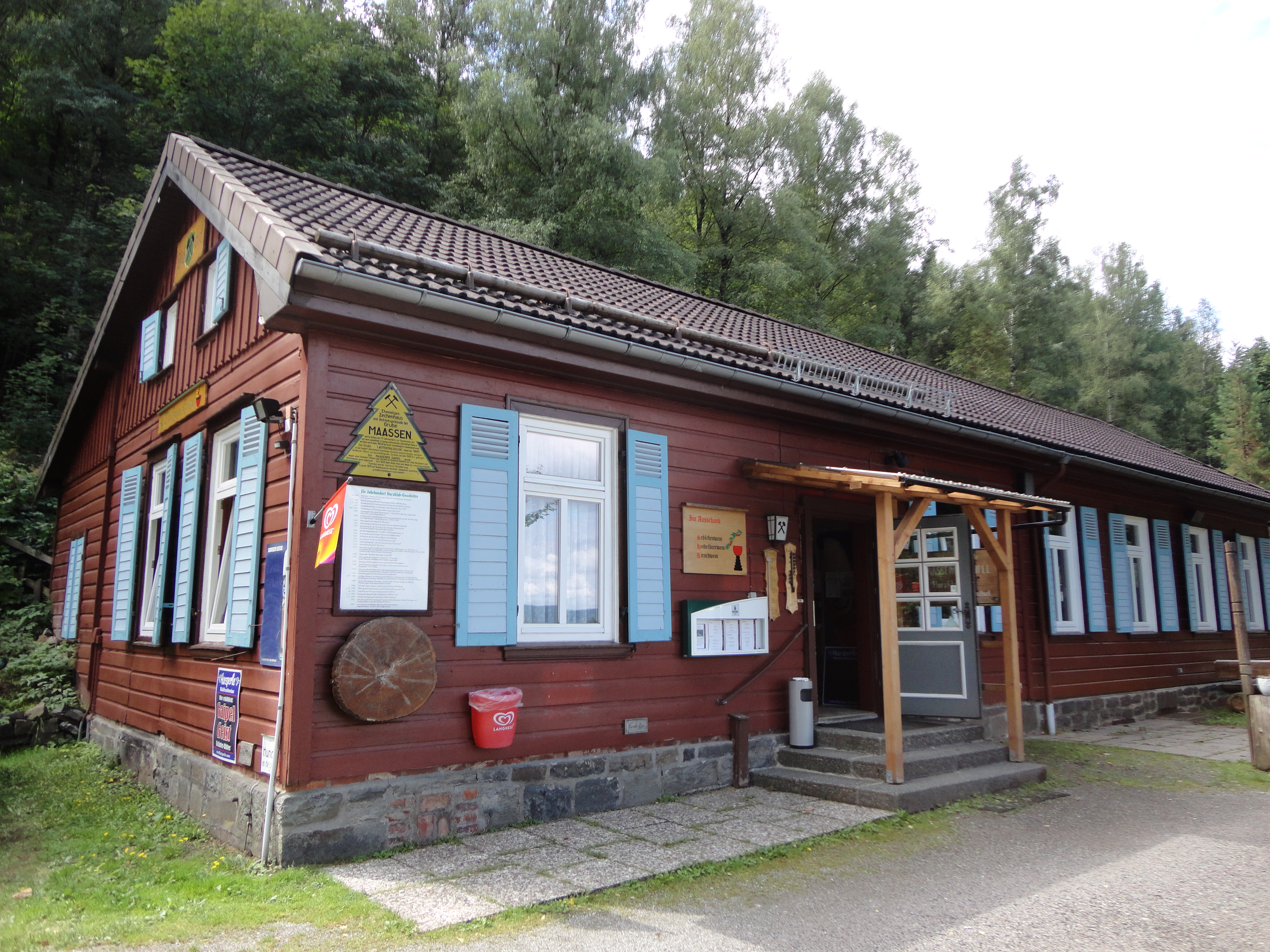
Present restaurant building, built 1924

The Maaßener Gaipel is a pub catering for day trippers on the northeastern hillside of the Kranichsberg at a height of 420 m above NN, situated above the mining town of Lautenthal in the Harz Mountains of central Germany. The name goes back to the above-ground workings of the Maaßener Treibschacht or Maaßen Hoisting Shaft 51°51′49″N 10°17′25″E, which was located immediately east of the inn. Gaipel is a common expression in the Upper Harz for a headframe (Schachtgebäude or Treibehaus) and goes back to the use of a horse whim which in German is a Pferdegöpel. Whims were used to transport men and materiel up and down mineshafts, for example using man engines, and also to operate water management equipment. Maaßen is shorthand for the name of the local pit which was the Grube Zweite, Dritte, Vierte, Fünfte und Sechste Maß nach der Sachsenzeche. Maaß, also variously spelt Maaß, Maas or Mas, is a unit of length for a pit field (Grubenfeld) and in mining in the Upper Harz measured 28 Lachter or 53.8 metres. The pub was built in 1924 on the initiative of the Harz Club on the terrain of the old mine shaft. But decades before the area had already become a popular destination with walkers due to its views of the mining town and the valley of the Laute.

== History ==
=== Mining ===
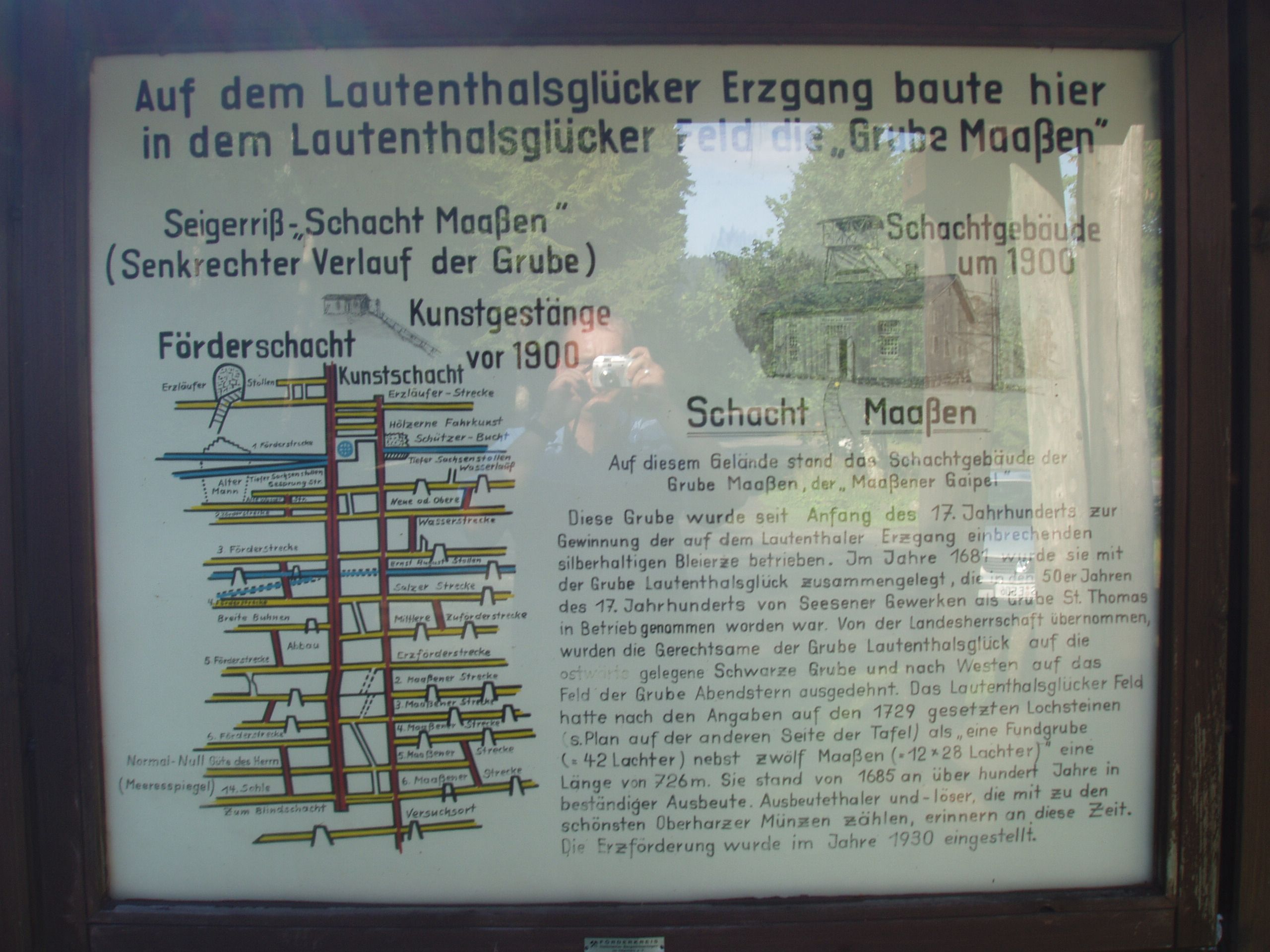
Display board by the Maaßener Treibeschacht in the vicinity of the Maaßener Gaipel forest inn

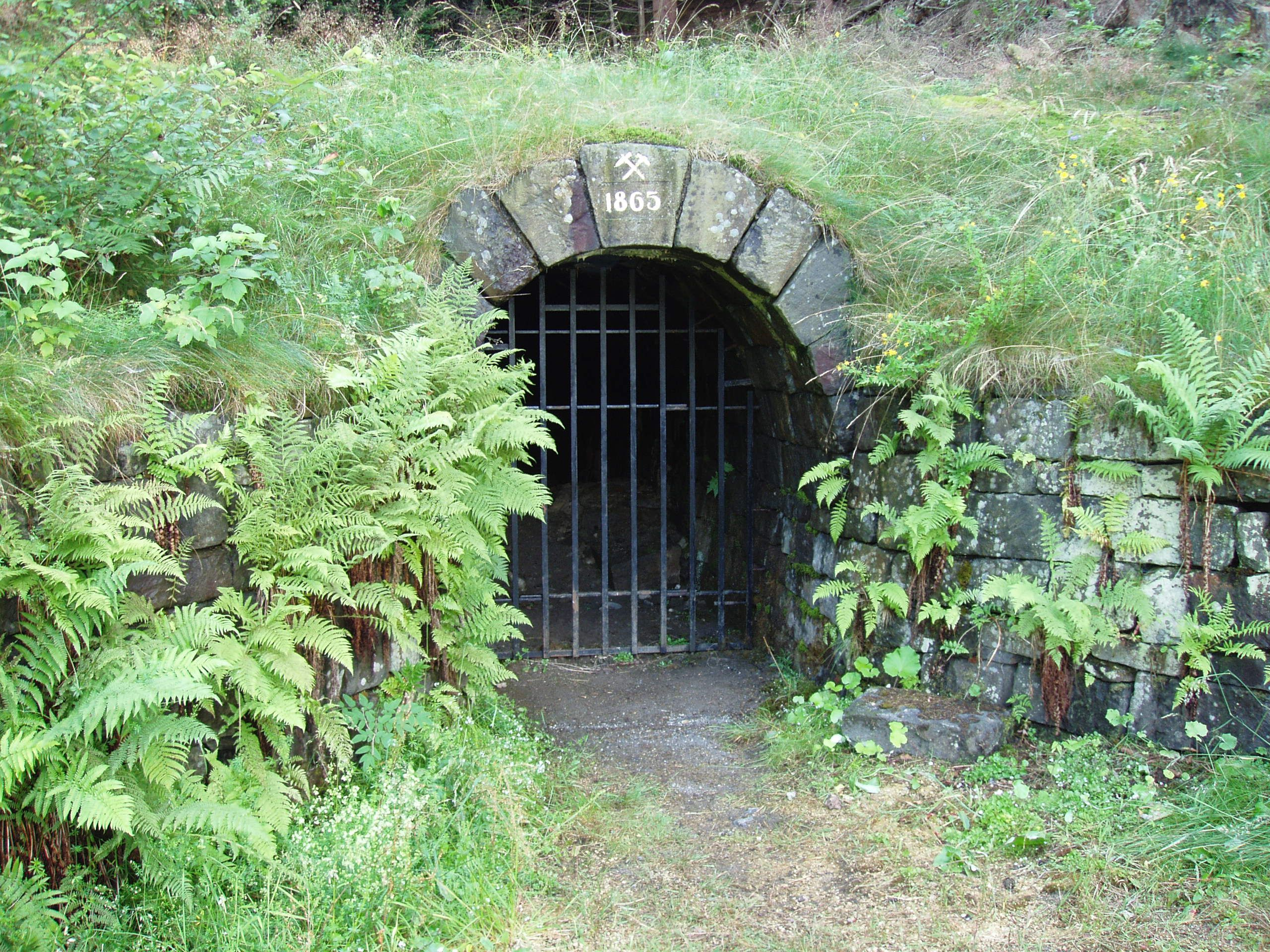
Portal of the Erzläufer Gallery along which ore from the Maaßener Treibschacht pit was transported for processing.

The pit known as Grube 2., 3., 4., 5. und 6. Maß was first mentioned in 1622. But at some time before 1676 it was renamed the Grube St. Thomas ("St. Thomas Pit") and, in 1681, the mine became part of the Lautenthals Glück Pit.

From 1720 the Maaßen Hoisting Shaft (Maaßener Treibschacht) and Maaßen Water Shaft (Maaßener Kunstschacht) of the Lautenthals Glück Pit were used to hoist ore and surplus water to the surface. At that time, both shafts were so-called winzes and did not open at the surface. From 1718, the hoisting shaft had a winding engine. From 1842 to 1844 the hoisting shaft was driven to the surface. In the subsequent period, the headframe and other above-ground facilities were added. The reversible water wheel lay 29 metres down the shaft and around 70 metres to the north. It was powered by water from the Oberer Richtschachter Graben. The old water wheel of the blind hosting shaft was another 40 metres deeper in an underground wheel room. In the Maaßen Water Shaft there was a double man engine for enabling miners to journey to and from the Lautenthals Glück Pit. These and the pumping need for water management were driven by four underground water wheels, which received their water through the Maaßen Watercourse (Maaßener Wasserlauf) which is still visible today.

With the sinking of a new central hoisting shaft in the years 1905 to 1909 the old Maaßen shafts lost their importance. In 1908 the hoisting shaft was filled in, and its equipment dismantled by 1920. The water shaft continued to act as a ventilation shaft until the mine was closed in 1930.

=== Pub ===
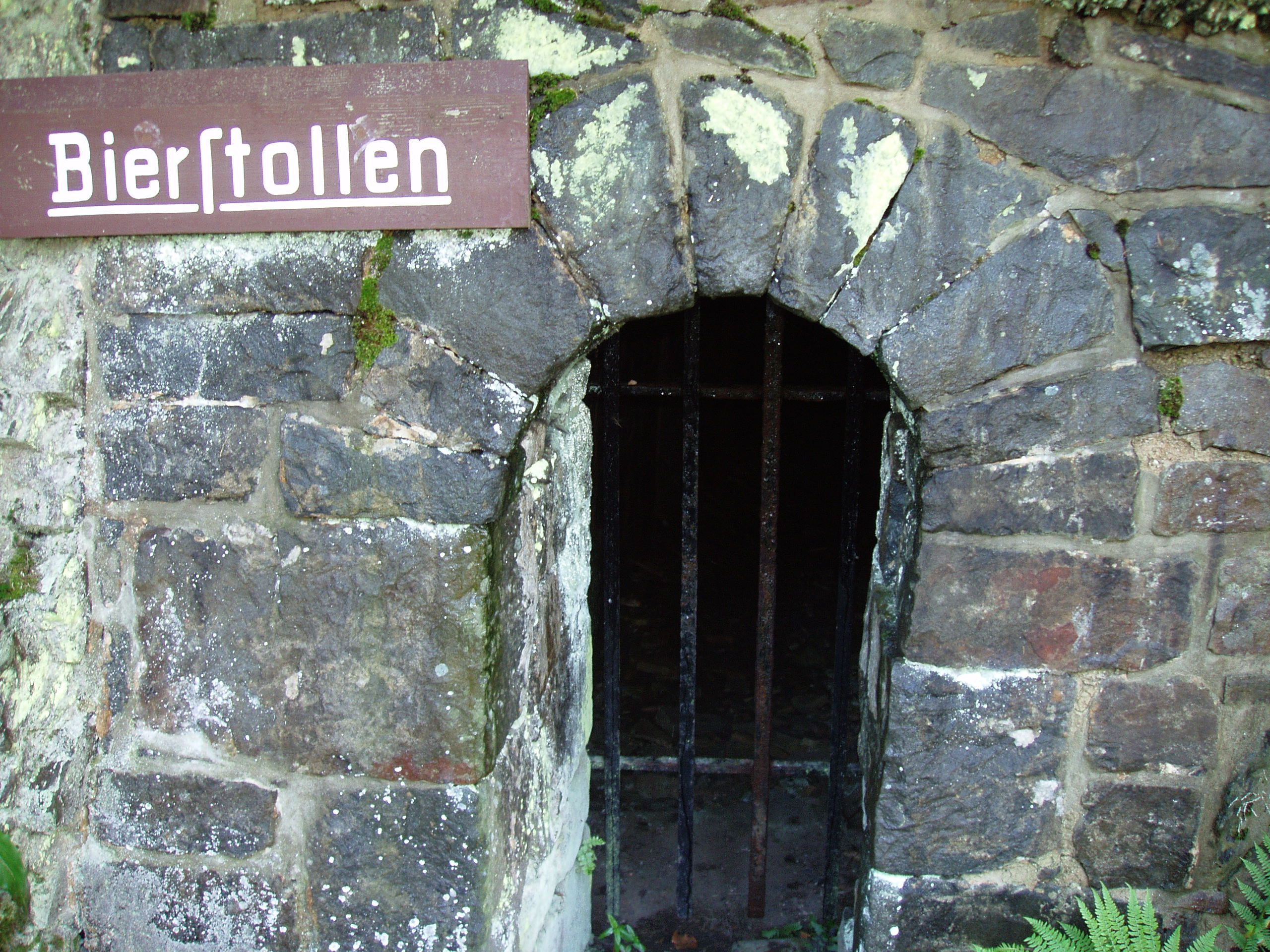
Portal of an old mine gallery at the Maaßen Hoisting Shaft. It is used by the pub as a drinks store, hence the name.

Because area around the mine was already being visited by walkers, in the 1860s a small garden with seating was laid out on the spoil heap. The miners operating the shaft provided visitors with hot water for brewing their coffee. When, in 1920, the mining facilities disappeared, their loss threatened this popular destination. As a result, the then chairman of the local branch of the Harz Club, master forester, Quickert, and mining administrator (Bergrat), Barry, had the idea of building a pub on the site of the Maaßener Gaipel. With donated construction wood and volunteers, a small forest inn was built from 1924 to 1925, which was managed by the Harz Club. In order to avoid the threat of closure due to its poor state of repair, from 1976 to 1978 the guest room and kitchen were modernised and toilets added. In the 1980s, the Harz Club bought the mining land, which covered an area of 14 hectares, from Preussag AG Metall.

The inn is checkpoint number 107 in the Harzer Wandernadel hiking system.

== Original appearance of the mine and its traces today ==
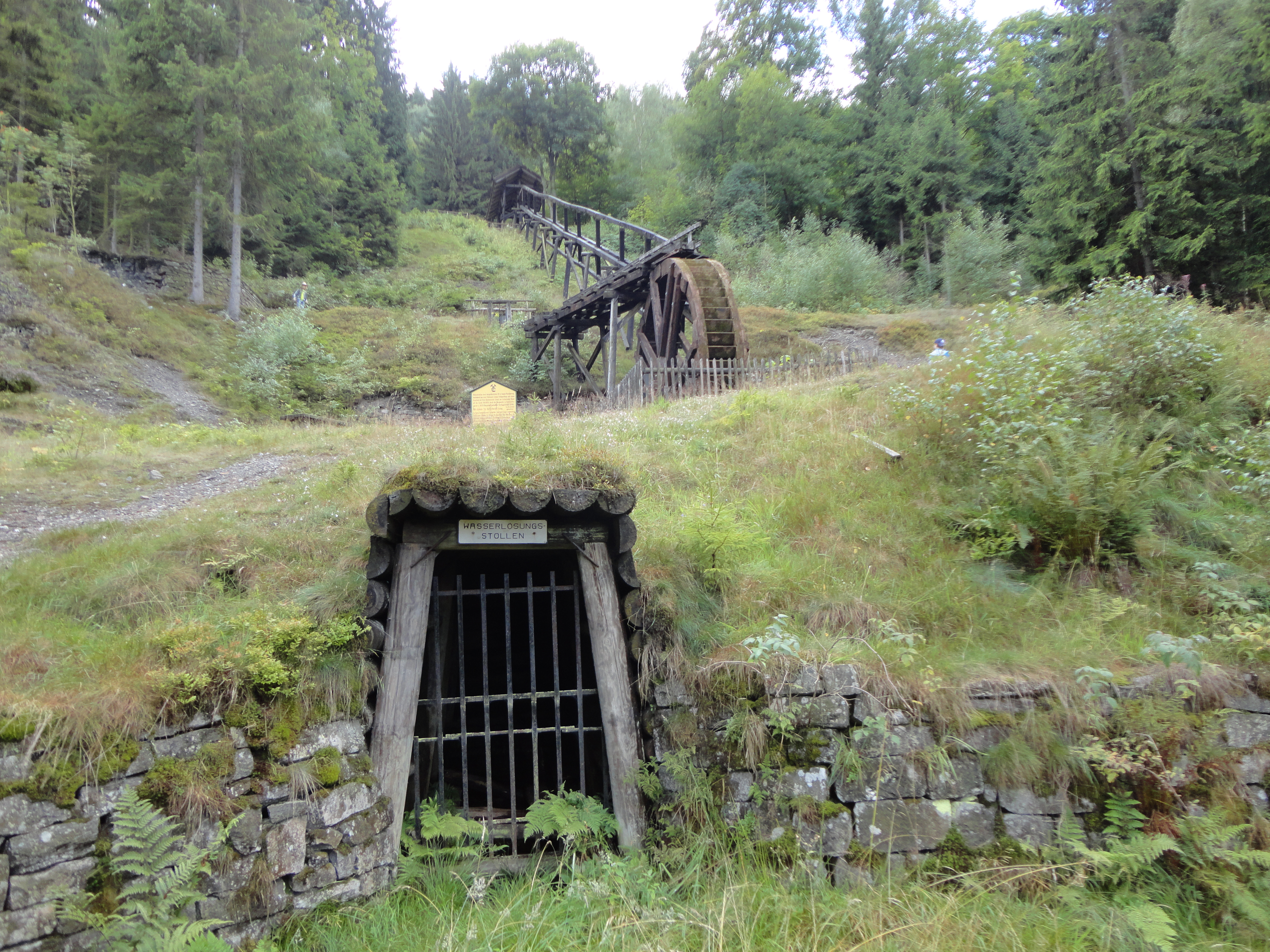
Replica of a mining wheel with flatrod system on the site of the old reversible water wheel

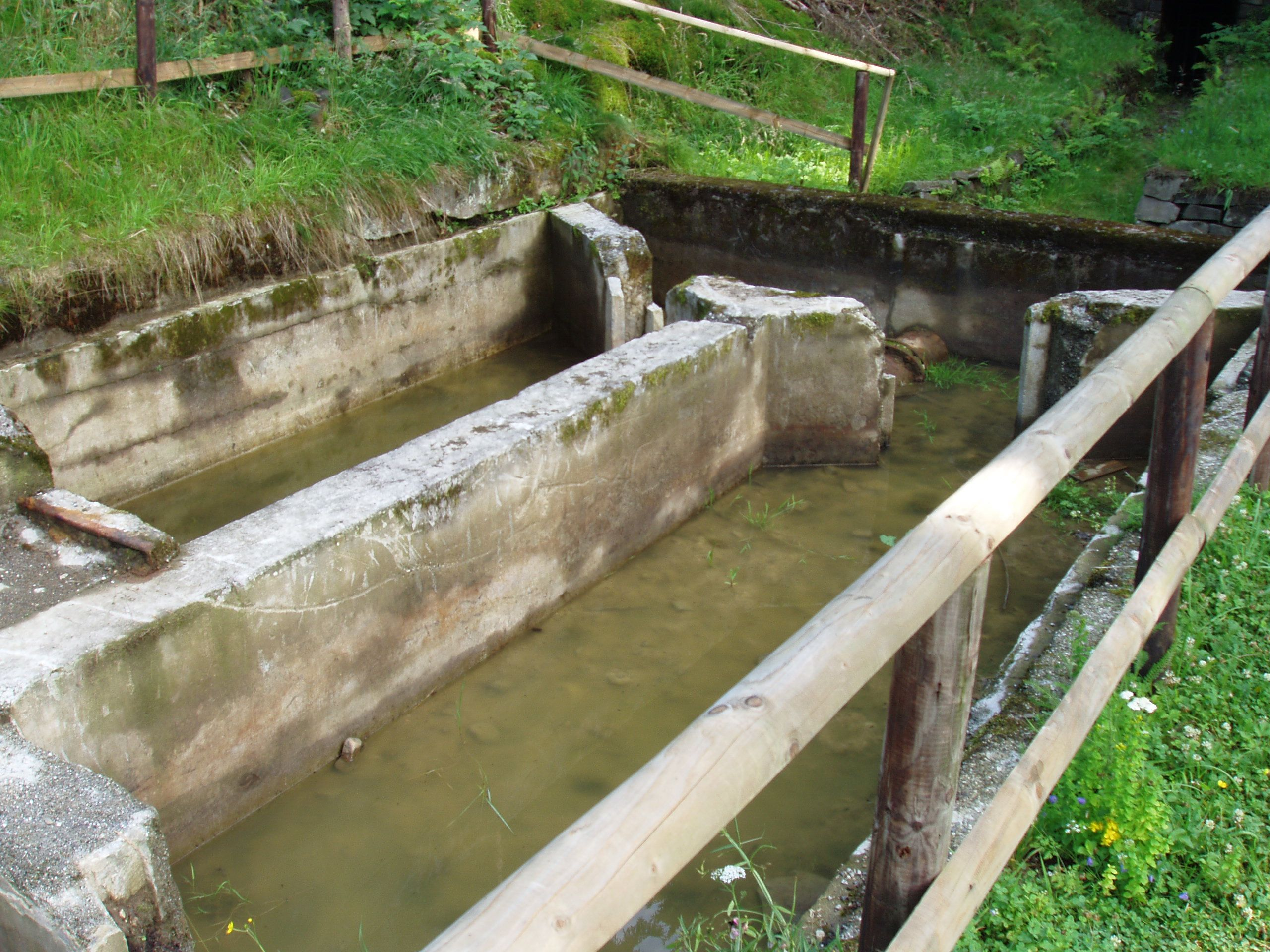
Sand trap behind the Maaßener Wasserlauf. The portal can be seen in the background.

A 1918 postcard shows the original headframe building. The headframe was a simple, two-storey, wooden building with a shallow gable roof. From the roof projected a low, steel hoisting frame with a timber-framed cover above the sheaves, which redirected the hoisting cable from the reversible water wheel into the sloping shaft. In the face of the gable wall were openings for feeding the flatrods of the water wheel which ran down the slope. The mine railway emerged from the gateway at the side of the building.

On the slope behind the headframe was the portal to an adit, which was later used by the pub as a drinks cellar under the name Bierstollen ("beer gallery").

East of the present inn building the Mining and History Society of the Mining Town of Lautenthal (Bergwerks- und Geschichtsverein Bergstadt Lautenthal von 1976 e.V.) built a working model of mining equipment between 1992 and 1998 in order to show the original function of the area. The water wheel at a scale of 1:2 with a six-metre diameter is not far from the spot where the reversible water wheel of the Maaßen Hoisting Shaft used to turn.

Next to the Bierstollen stands a model of a wooden pit support system, which is part of the Lautenthal Mining Education Path (Lautenthaler Bergbaulehrpfad).

In the area around the forest inn are several display boards on mining history including a Dennert Fir Tree.

== Literature ==
- Christoph Bartels (1992), Vom frühneuzeitlichen Montangewerbe bis zur Bergbauindustrie (in German), Bochum: Deutsches Bergbaumuseum, ISBN 3-921533-53-8
- Torsten Schröpfer (2000), Fundgrube: Wissenswertes über den Westharzer Bergbau und das Hüttenwesen (in German) (1. ed.), Clausthal-Zellerfeld: Pieper, ISBN 3-923605-08-0
- Klaus Stedingk (2002), Lautenthal: Bergstadt im Oberharz; Bergbau- und Hüttengeschichte (in German), Lautenthal: Bergwerks- und Geschichtsverein Bergstadt Lautenthal von 1976, ISBN 3-00-009504-7
