= Hassenstein =

Hassenstein is a surname. Notable people with the surname include:

- Bernhard Hassenstein (1922–2016), German biologist and behaviorist.
- Bruno Hassenstein (1839–1902), German cartographer

== See also ==
- Bohuslav Hasištejnský z Lobkovic (1461–1510), Czech nobleman, writer and humanist
- Hasištejn Castle, castle in Bohemian
