= Röhrigschacht =

Coordinates: 51°31′2.7″N 11°16′57″E

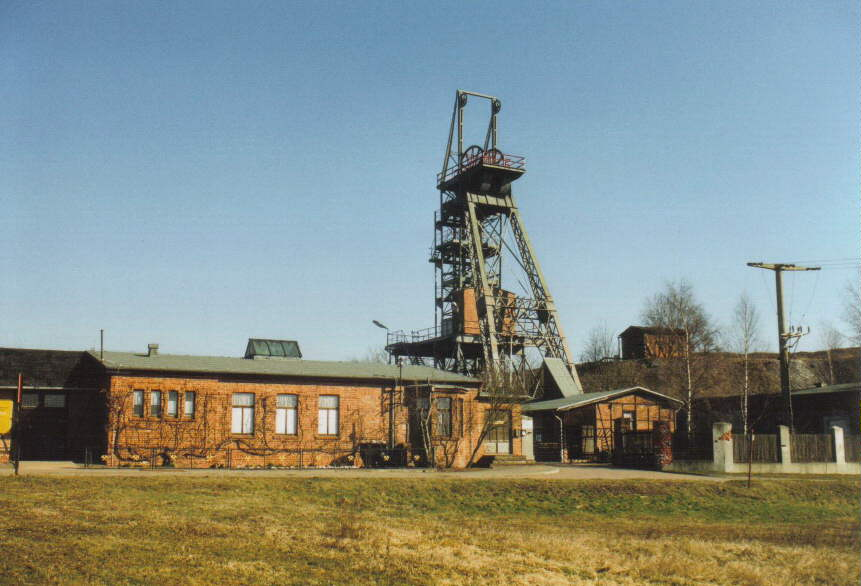
The former copper slate mine of Röhrigschacht with its head frame

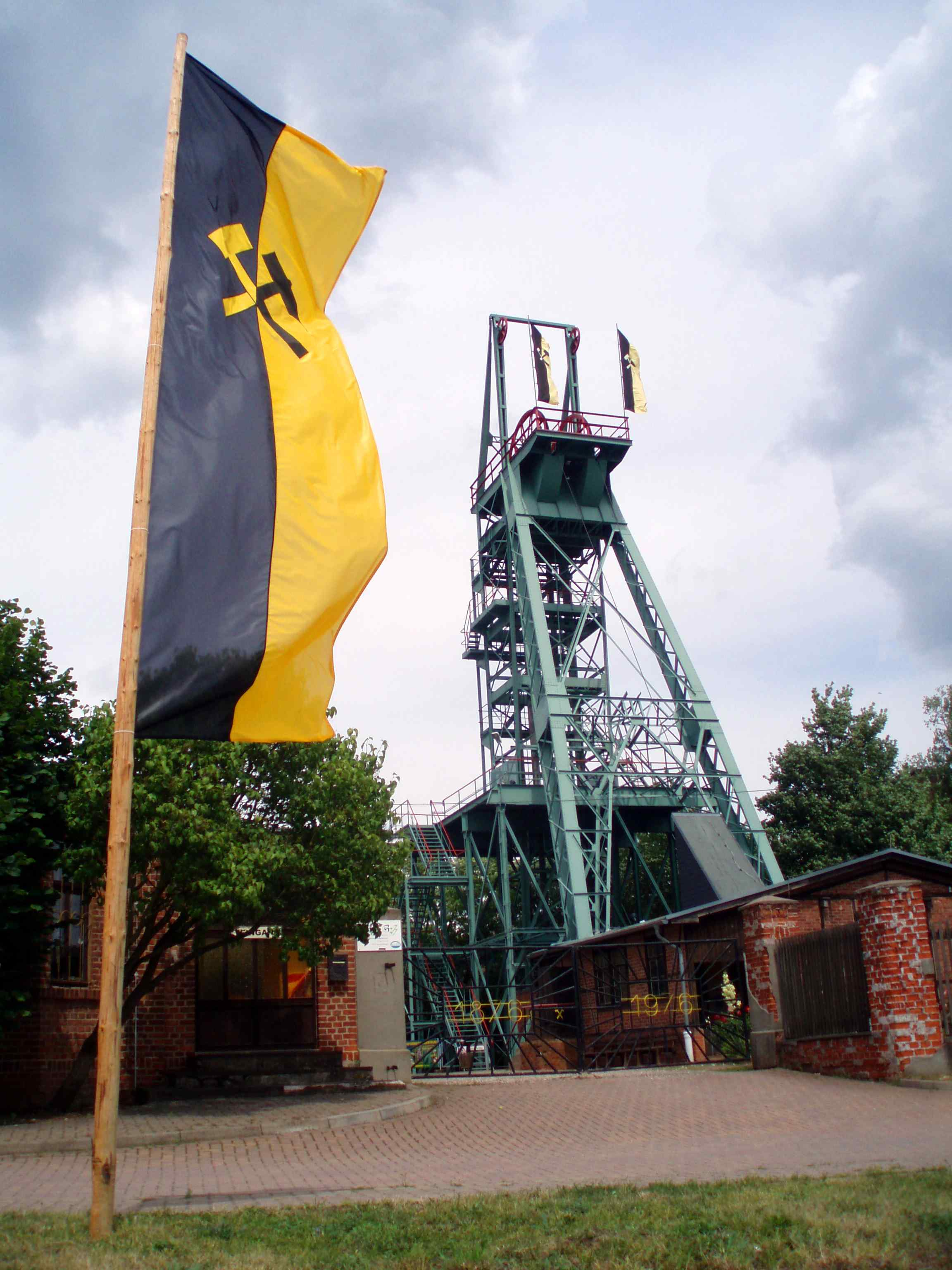
Close up of the Röhrigschacht head frame

The Röhrigschacht ("Röhrig Shaft") is an old copper slate mine which is now a mining museum and show mine in the village of Wettelrode in the county of Mansfeld-Südharz in the German state of Saxony-Anhalt.

== Location ==
The Röhrigschacht lies in the transition zone from the Lower Harz to the southeastern Harz Foreland in the nature park of Harz/Saxony-Anhalt. It is in the South Harz Karst Landscape Biosphere Reserve. It is located on the northwestern edge of Wettelrode, north of Sangerhausen and south of the Steinberg (348.8 m above sea level (NN)). The above-ground elements of the old copper works lie at an elevation of 305 m.

== History ==
Copper slate and schist was mined in the Mansfeld Land, southeast Harz and southeastern Harz Foreland from 1200 to 1990., for example in the Sangerhausen Field (Sangerhäuser Revier) and thus in the Röhrigschacht. The mineshaft is part of the historic mining landscape of the southeastern Harz Foreland. Its head frame, which dates to 1888, is one of the oldest in Europe.

== Museum ==
The above-ground mining museum opened in 1987 and has information about geology, and mineralogy, and ore deposit formation, as well as the 800-year history of mining in the area. There are examples of both historic and more recent mining equipment and tools (so-called Gezähe) on display. Equipment and tools on display include drilling and compressed air machines and chargers, transportation equipment, face mechanisation equipment, and equipment for ventilation and drainage.

In the underground show mine, opened in 1991, visitors join a guided tour where they use the old hoist to descend to a depth of 283 m. Visitors are then transported about 1,000 metres by pit railway to a copper slate seam in a 19th-century mining field. There, with the aid of exhibits, guides describe old mining methods that were used before modern times.

== Walking ==
The Röhrigschacht is No. 222 in the system of checkpoints of the Harzer Wandernadel hiking network. The checkpoint itself is located on an information board by the car park next to the show mine. The Karst Trail runs past the old mine about 300 metres to the north.
