= Brunnenbach =

Brunnenbach may refer to the following rivers or streams in Germany:

- Brunnenbach (Lochbach), right tributary of the Lochbach in the city of Augsburg, Bavaria
- Brunnenbach (Warme Bode), right tributary of the Warme Bode near Braunlage, Goslar, Lower Saxony
