= Bärenbrucher Teich =

Reservoir

Coordinates: 51°46′39″N 10°21′05″E

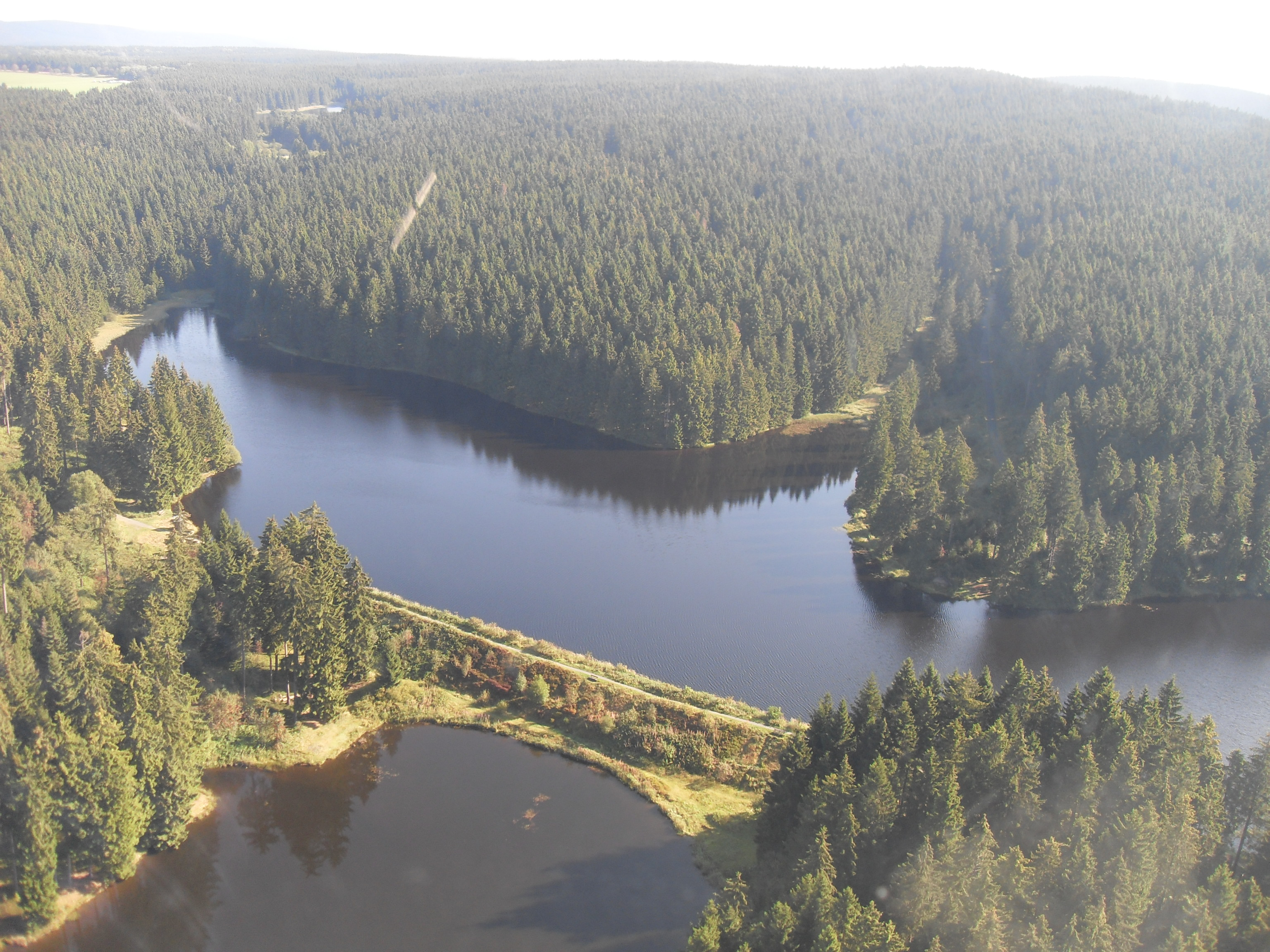
Aerial photograph: Dam and water surface of the Bärenbrucher Teich

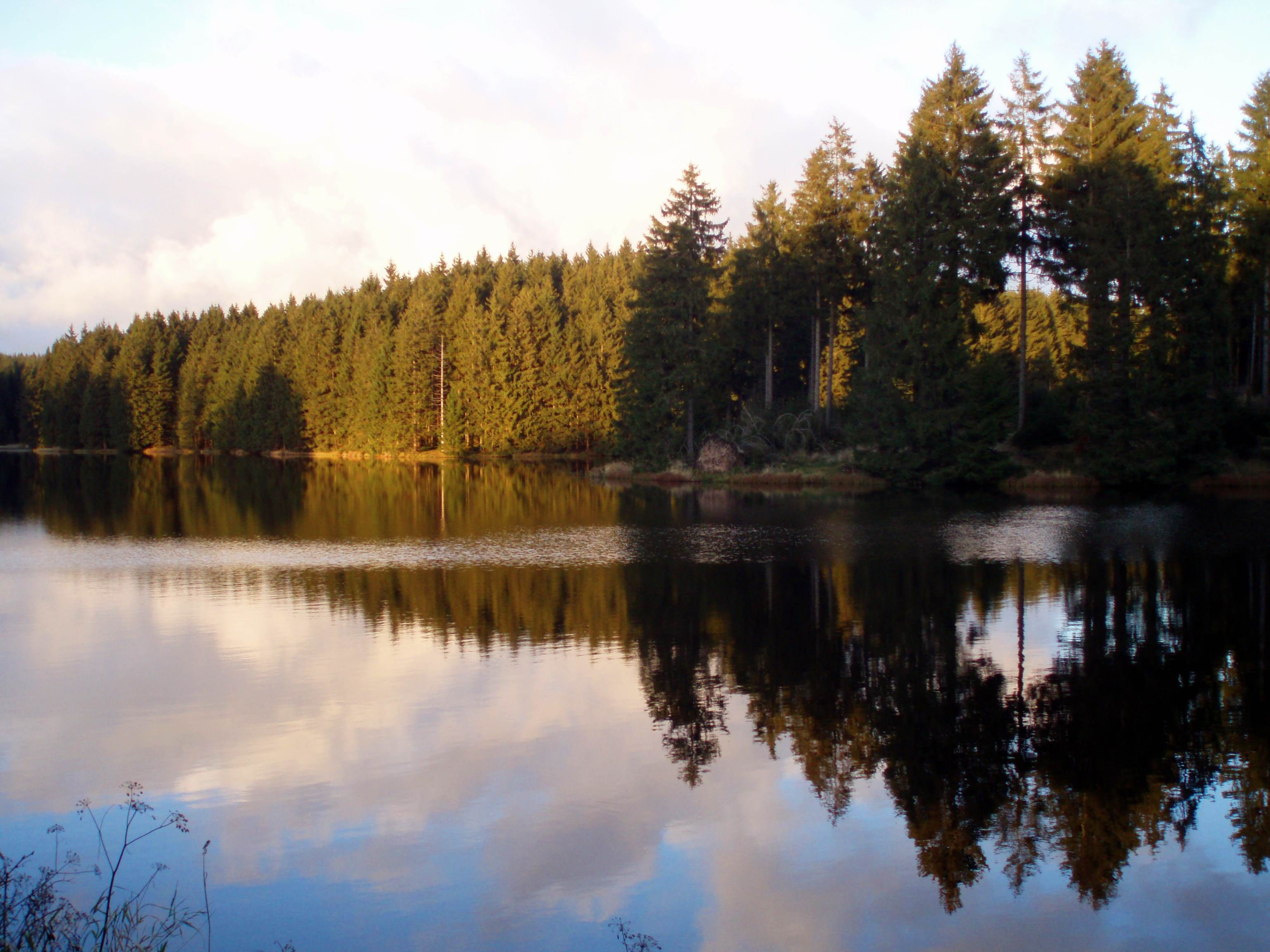
Evening at the Bärenbrucher Teich

The Bärenbrucher Teich ("Bärenbruch Pond") is a historic reservoir in the Harz Mountains of central Germany. It lies east of Buntenbock near Clausthal-Zellerfeld.

It belongs to the Upper Harz Ponds, that were originally created to supply water power for the Upper Harz mines. Its retaining capacity is 186,000m³ and its barrage is around 7 metres high. The history of the Bärenbrucher Teich goes back to 1634.

The water of the Bärenbrucher Teich can be channelled along the Bärenbruch Ditch (Bärenbrucher Wasserlauf), laid in 1948, through a sequence of six water tunnels and intermediate ditches to the Rosenhof, where it was used to supply power to the Rosenhof Pit and, later, the Ottiliae Shaft Power Station. Another drainage outlet is the normal bottom outlet, which discharges water into the Ziegenberger Teich located immediately below it. Today the Bärenbrucher Teich is normally operated as a spillway basin, that is, the bottom outlets are closed and water simply flows over the spillway into the Ziegenberger Teich.

There is a Harzer Wandernadel hiking checkpoint (no. 137) in the refuge hut at the eastern end of the dam.
