= Ulrichswasser =

River in Germany

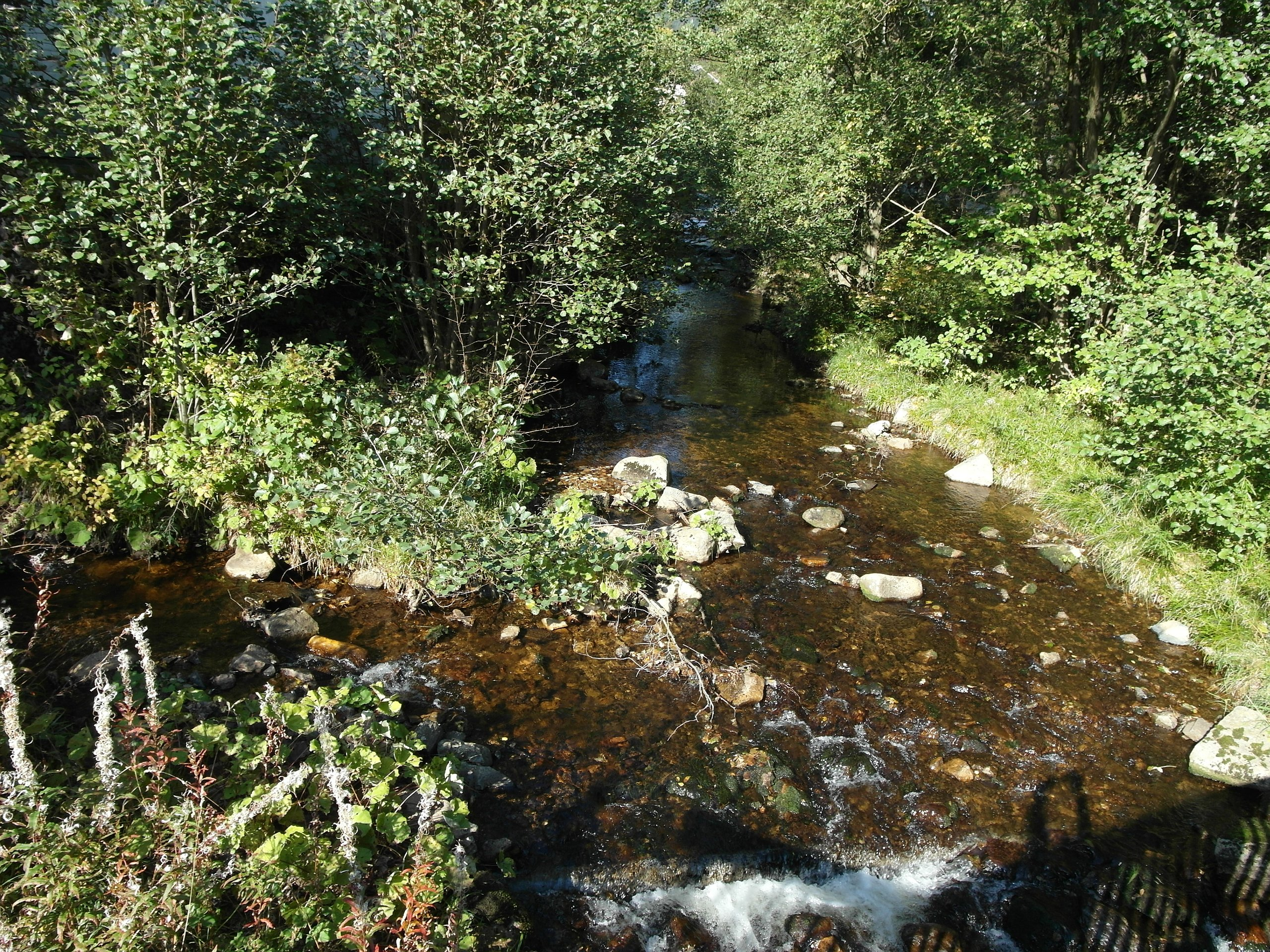
- The Ulrichswasser (left) discharging in the Warme Bode

Location
- Country: Germany
- State: Lower Saxony
- Location: between Königskrug and Braunlage in the district of Goslar

Physical characteristics
- Source
  - location: in the Königsbruch
  - coordinates: 51°45′00″N 10°34′41″E
  - elevation: ca. 760 m above sea level (NN)
- Mouth
  - location: in Braunlage into the Warme Bode
  - coordinates: 51°44′02″N 10°36′36″E
  - elevation: ca. 580 m above sea level (NN)
- Length: ca. 3 km
- Basin size: 3.5 km^{2} (1.4 sq mi)

Basin features
- Progression: Warme Bode→ Bode→ Saale→ Elbe→ North Sea

The Ulrichswasser is a river of Lower Saxony, Germany. It is a right tributary of the Warme Bode in the town of Braunlage in the district of Goslar.

== Course ==
The source region of the Ulrichswasser lies roughly northeast of Königskrug in the Königsbruch marsh at the foot of the Achtermannshöhe ridge at a height of about 760 metres. The stream then descends 180 metres over a distance of 3 km (1.9 mi) before discharging into the Warme Bode at a height of about 580 m above sea level.

The stream is not named after the forester Arthur Ulrichs (1838–1927) as might be supposed. It is described as the Ulmersches Wasser already on a forest map from the 18th century.

== See also ==
- List of rivers of Lower Saxony
