= Silberteich =

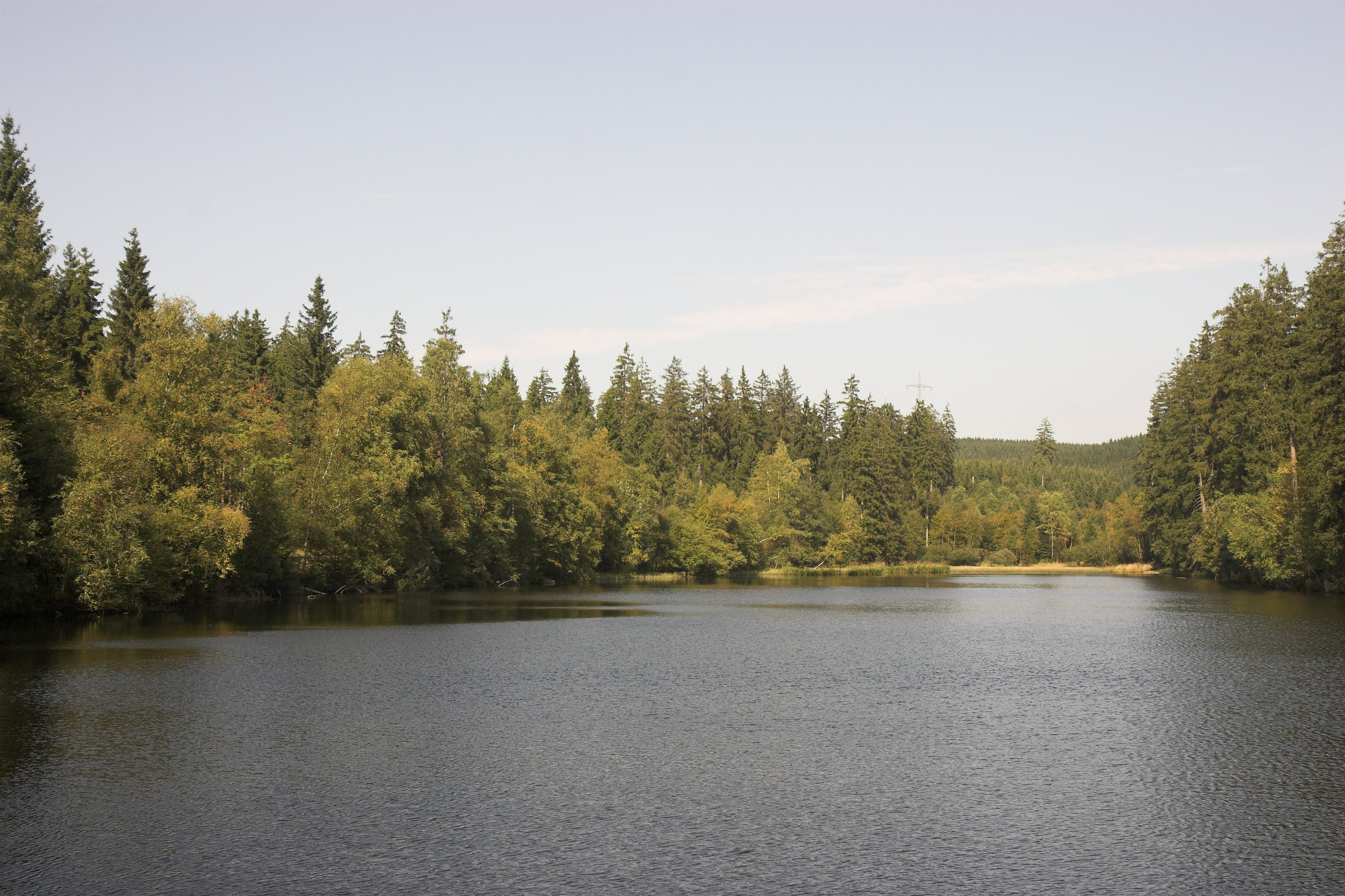
- The northern side of the Silberteich
- Interactive map of Silberteich
- Location: Goslar, Lower Saxony, Germany
- Construction began: 1755
- Operator: Harz National Park

Dam and spillways
- Type of dam: Dam
- Impounds: Brunnenbach
- Length: 90 m (300 ft)

Reservoir
- Total capacity: 22,000 m^{3}
- Surface area: c. 1.4 ha
- Maximum length: 0.3 km
- Maximum width: 0.08 km

Power Station
- Operator: Harz National Park

The Silberteich is a man-made reservoir, of a type called a Kunstteich, and lies on the upper reaches of the Brunnenbach stream between Braunlage and Sankt Andreasberg in the Harz Mountains of Germany. It was built as part of the historic Upper Harz Water Regale.

== Description ==
The pond is about 300 metres long with an earth dam about 8 m high. Material for the construction of the dam came from a quarry on the west bank immediately next to the embankment. Today the reservoir is located in the middle of the Harz National Park and is managed by the park authorities. A path runs along the eastern shore, in places along the water's edge. Otherwise paths have been kept some distance away in order to create a quiet zone for flora and fauna.

== History ==
The reservoir was laid out in 1755, but even during its construction the height of the embankments was raised twice. Its design was based on that of the 'new type' (neuer Bauart) of Upper Harz Pond with a watertight seal of grass sods. The surrounding embankments were initially too steep and had to be remodelled several times; apparently when the embankments were raised in height, their feet were not increased accordingly. The Silberteich was probably built to supply the ore mines to the southwest with water power. This was the Hoffnungsbergbau ("Mine of Hope") which was heavily financed by the mining authorities but which had to be finally closes around 1780 due to a lack of profitability. The Silberteich then found a new use supplying power to the Braunlage Blue Glass Factory (Braunlager Blaufarbenwerk), which was built on the site of the present-day Waldmühle. Originally the reservoir was called the Andreasberger Teich or Brunnenbacher Teich, where Teich means 'pond'. Its present name (which means 'Silver Pond') was chosen quite recently to make it more attractive as a tourist destination.

When walking along the footpath that grazes the eastern shore, the experienced eye will notice that this path is an old 'leat' (Hanggraben) that follows the contours of the hill. This was probably dug to be able to divert water past the reservoir during times of flooding.

== Surrounding area ==
The Sankt Andreasberg trail (Sankt Andreasberger Fußstieg), which used to be the shortest route between Braunlage and Sankt Andreasberg, runs along the dam crest. Meanwhile, the direct path from the forest pub of Rinderstall on the Oder up to the Silberteich has been largely destroyed by the National Park authorities, so that the journey today requires a detour of more than double the length.

== 1760 dam burst ==
From 1–5 February 1760 there was heavy rainfall in the Harz, apparently accompanied by a rapid thaw. During the night of 4/5 February water poured over the recently built dam. The dam broke along a length of 30 metres and floodwaters poured into the Brunnenbach valley. The waters built up in front of the Brunnenbach Mill, forming a barrier of trees and branches they had brought down with them. The swollen waters looked for a new way out and swept the mill away. The reason for this accident, which took places just five years after the reservoir was completed, was that the spillway was too small and had become choked with ice floes. Following its rebuilding in 1763, the Silberteich was also known until about 1900 as the Neue Teich ('New Pond').

== Gallery ==
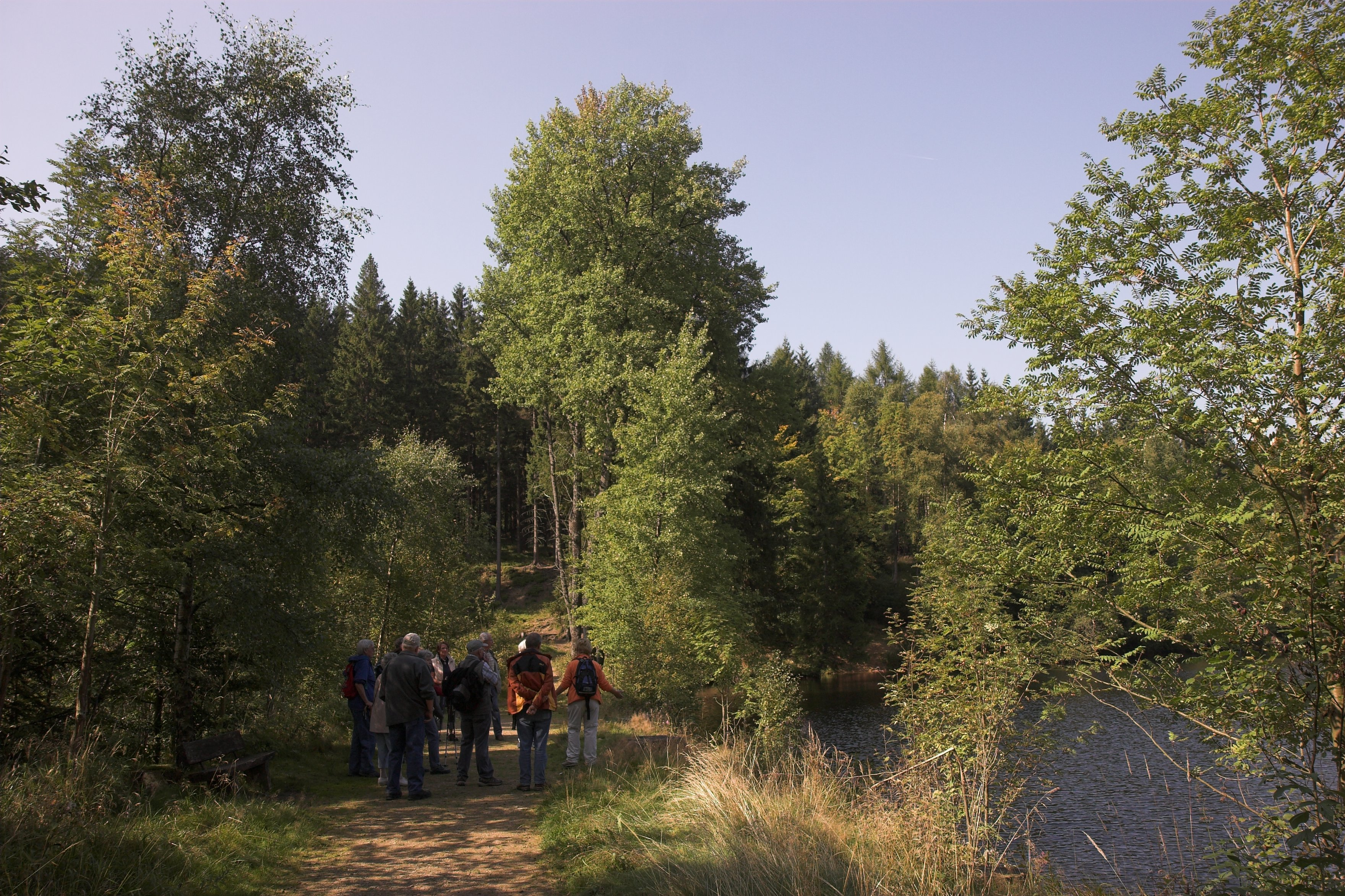
The Andreasberger Stieg trail on the dam crest of the Silberteich dam

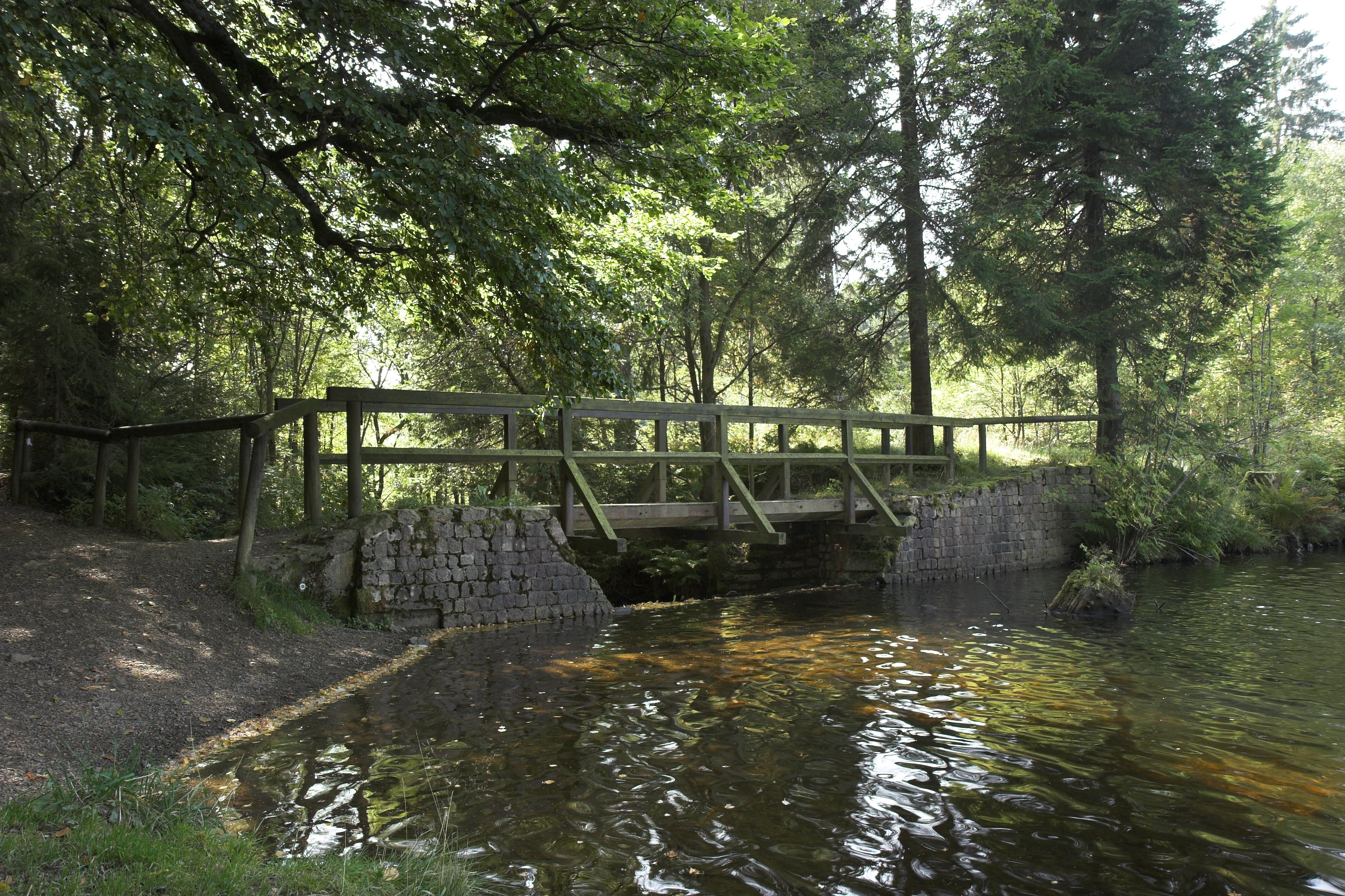
Outflow of the Silberteich into the Brunnenbach from the lake...

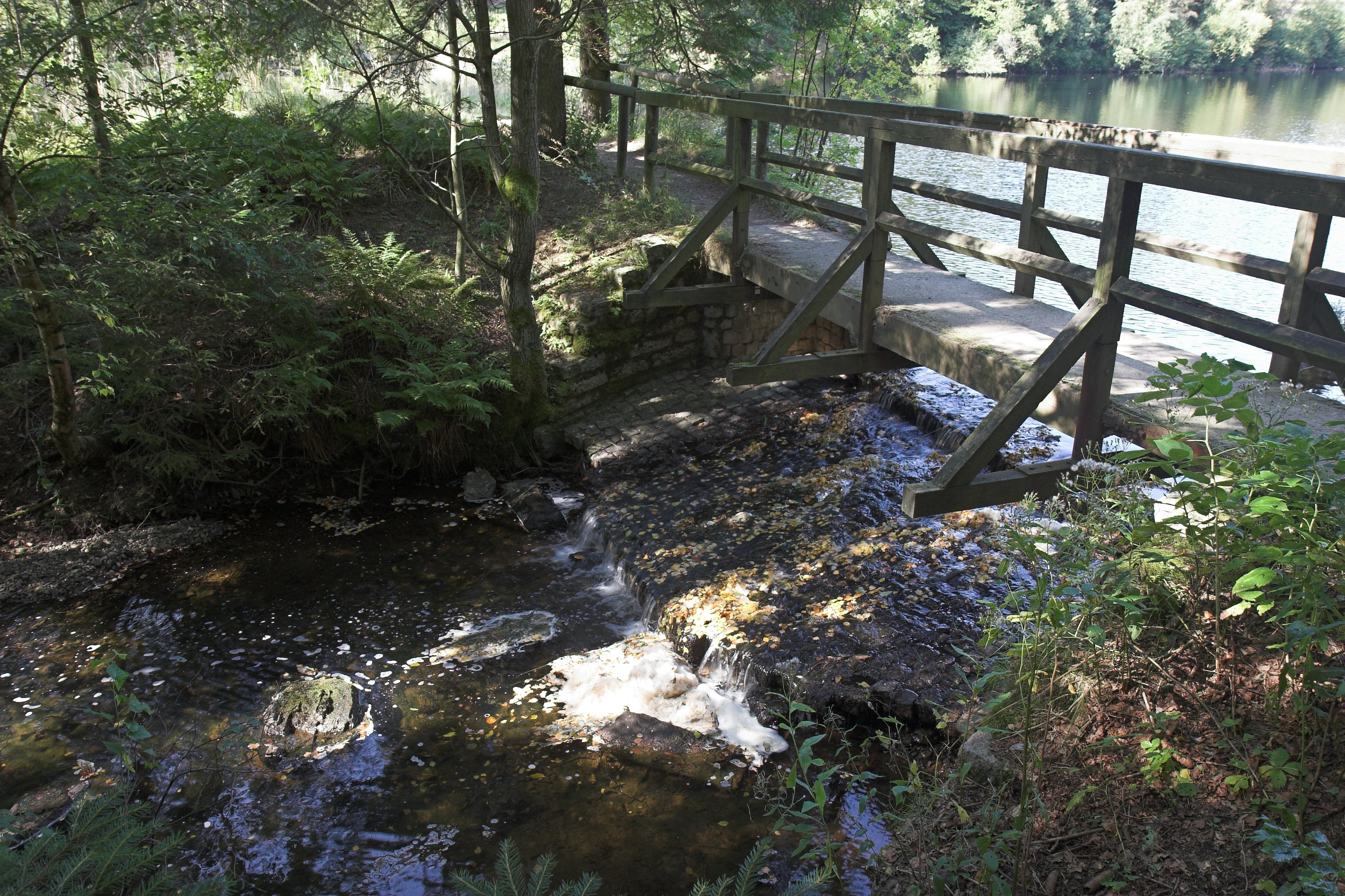
… and the stream side

== See also ==
- Upper Harz Ponds
