= Brunnenbach (Warme Bode) =

River in Lower Saxony, Germany

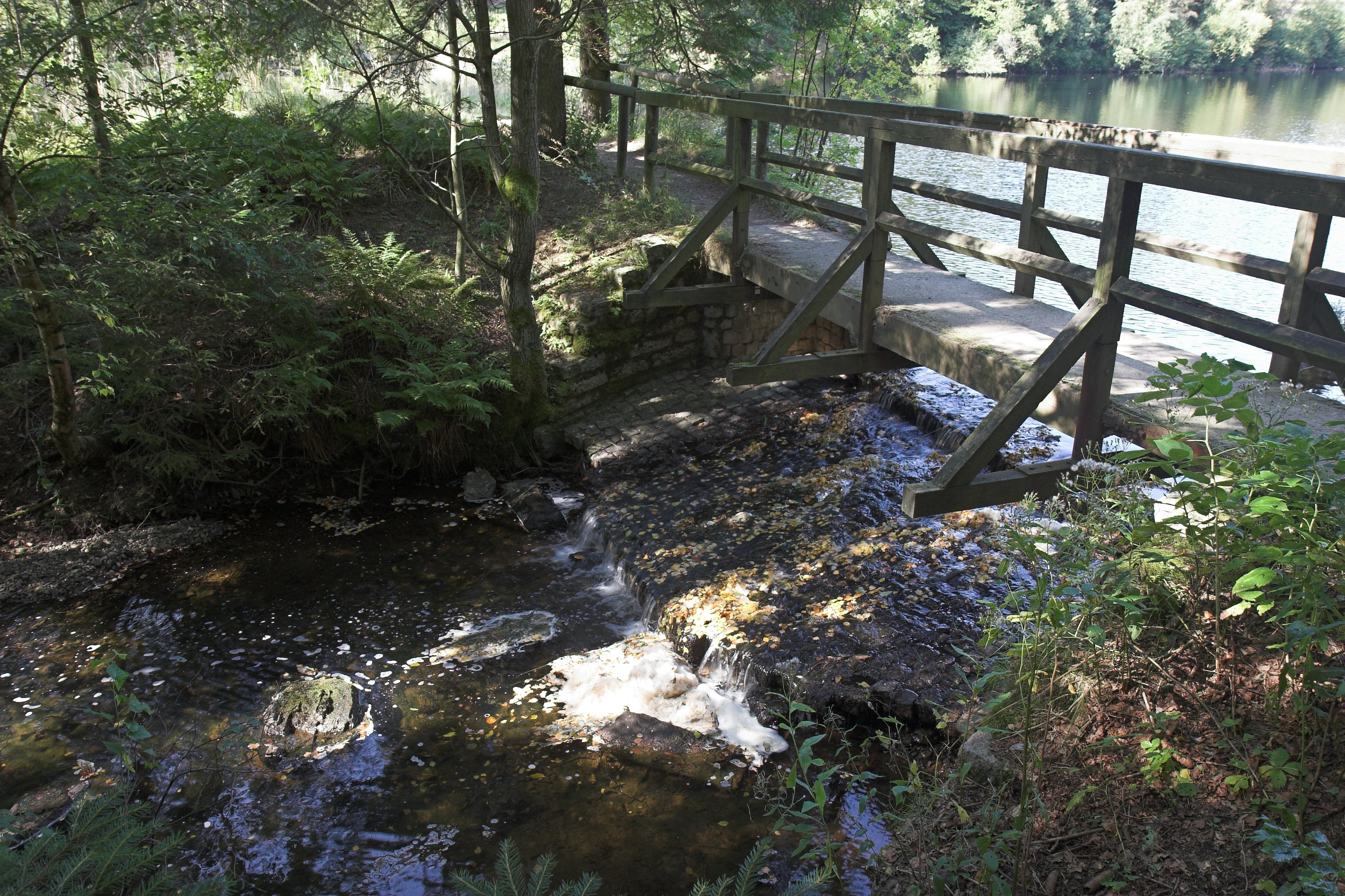
- The Brunnenbach as the tailwater of the Silberteich reservoir

Location
- Country: Germany
- State: Lower Saxony
- Location: west and south of Braunlage in Goslar district

Physical characteristics
- Source
  - elevation: over 720 m
- Mouth
  - location: into the Warme Bode
  - coordinates: 51°41′52″N 10°40′22″E
  - elevation: under 500 m
- Length: 11.9 km (7.4 mi)

Basin features
- Progression: Warme Bode→ Bode→ Saale→ Elbe→ North Sea
- Waterbodies: Reservoirs: Silberteich

The Brunnenbach is a 12 km (7.5 mi) long, right-hand tributary of the Warme Bode, which flows to the west and south of Braunlage in Goslar district in the north German state of Lower Saxony.

== Course ==
Shortly after its source the Brunnenbach is impounded by the Silberteich reservoir, before it continues in a southeasterly direction past the Mutter-Kind-Heim Waldmühle, a mother-and-child centre, and local campsite. It then passes the forest inn of Forellenteich and the forest youth centre of Brunnenbachsmühle, before finally turning east. The Brunnenbach is one of the most important tributaries of the Warme Bode. From its source to its mouth, the Brunnenbach descends some 220 meters in its 12 km journey.

== Tributaries ==
- Fußstiegbach (left)
- Großer Kronenbach (right)
- Schächerbach (right)
- Blechhüttenbach (left)

== See also ==
- List of rivers of Lower Saxony
