= Warme Bode =

River in Germany

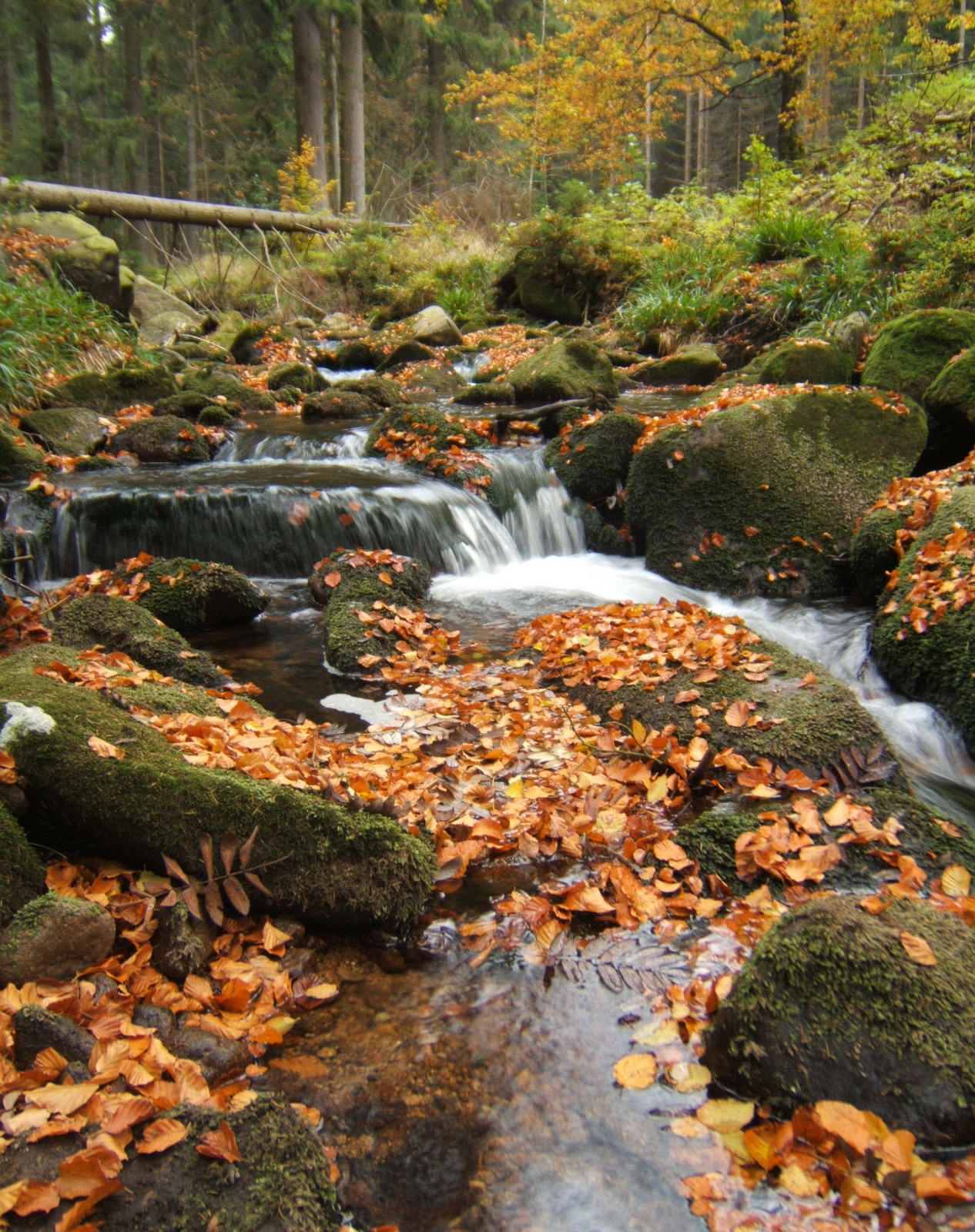
- The Große Bode in autumn

Location
- Country: Germany
- State: Saxony-Anhalt

Physical characteristics
- Source
  - location: Origin: confluence of the Große and Kleine Bode, near Braunlage
  - coordinates: 51°44′38″N 10°36′03″E
- Mouth
  - location: Confluence: with the Kalte Bode to form the Bode, near Königshütte
  - coordinates: 51°44′24″N 10°46′11″E
- Length: 23 km (14 mi)

Basin features
- Progression: Bode→ Saale→ Elbe→ North Sea
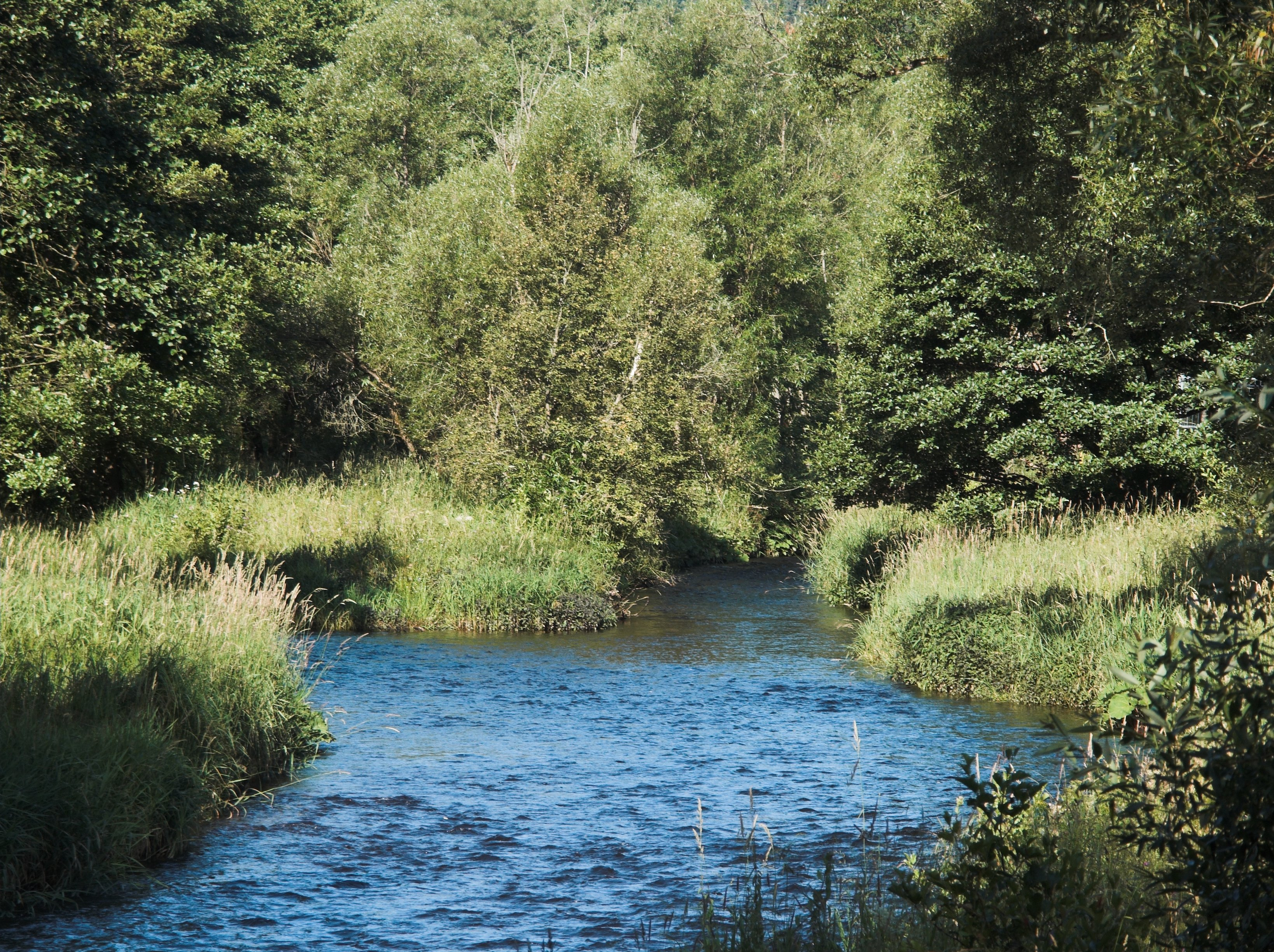
- Confluence of the Warme (left) and Kalte Bode (right) near Königshütte

The Warme Bode is the right-hand headstream of the Bode in the High Harz mountains of central Germany in the states of Lower Saxony and Saxony-Anhalt. It is 23 kilometres (14 mi) long and is formed by the confluence of the Große Bode and Kleine Bode rivers.

== Name ==
The names of the Warme and Kalte Bode ('Warm' and 'Cold' Bode) come from their actual temperature difference of about 2 °C.

== Headstreams ==
=== Große Bode ===
The Große Bode ('Great Bode') is the left-hand headstream of the Warme Bode and is about 4.5 kilometres (2.8 mi) long. Its source is at the foot of the highest mountain in the Harz, the Brocken, in the southern part of the so-called Brockenfeld on the border of Saxony-Anhalt. Immediately nearby are the sources of the Kalte Bode, the Ecker and the Oder. The Große Bode flows mainly southwards, on the western slopes of the Wurmberg towards Braunlage. Its course is characterised by little waterfalls and steps (Fallstufen) including the Oberer Bodefall. In front of Braunlage it joins the Kleine Bode ('Little Bode') to form the Warme Bode.

=== Kleine Bode ===
The Kleine Bode is the right-hand headstream of the Warme Bode and is about 2.5 kilometres (1.6 mi) long. It rises at the foot of the Achtermannshöhe.

== Course ==
After the confluence of its headstreams, the Warme Bode flows over the waterfall of the Unterer Bodefall towards Braunlage. There it is joined by the Ulrichswasser. It continues in the direction of Sorge. From the state border with Saxony-Anhalt it runs parallel to the B 242 federal road to Tanne.

Next the Warme Bode runs through a valley and is united with the Kalte Bode near Königshütte, below the ruins of Königsburg to form the Bode.

== Tributaries ==
Left tributaries	Right tributaries
Große Bode (Braunlage); Bremke; Amkenbach; Schieferbach; Spielbach	Kleine Bode (Braunlage); Ulrichswasser (Braunlage); Großer Goldbach; Kleiner Goldbach; Brunnenbach; Ochsenbach (Sorge); Großer Allerbach (Tanne)
In brackets the location where the tributary joins the Warme Bode.

== See also ==
- List of rivers of Lower Saxony
- List of rivers of Saxony-Anhalt
