= Upper Harz Ponds =

Lakes in Upper Harz, Germany

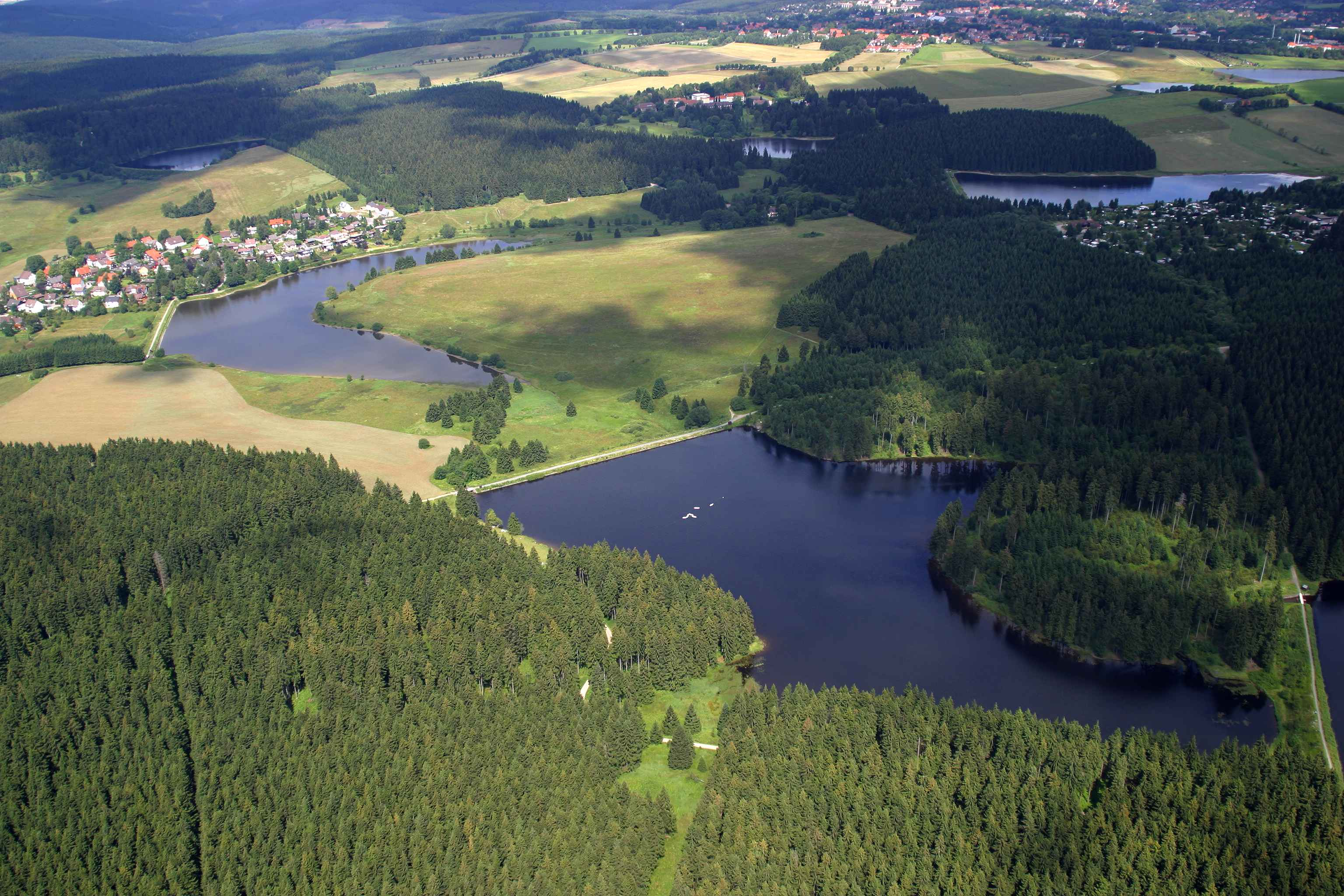
Ponds near Buntenbock south of Clausthal-Zellerfeld: the Ziegenberg Pond (front) and Marsh Pond (Sumpfteich, rear). Their dams are clearly visible.

The Upper Harz Ponds (German: Oberharzer Teiche) are found mainly around the mining town of Clausthal-Zellerfeld and the nearby villages of Buntenbock and Hahnenklee in the Upper Harz mountains of central Germany. There are around 70 ponds in total, both large and small. They were built by the miners of the Upper Harz, mostly between the 16th and 18th centuries, and are important components of the cultural monument known as the Upper Harz Water Regale - a network of dams, ditches, ponds and tunnels that was built to supply much-needed water power for the mining industry in the Harz mountains. Today the Water Regale is being proposed as a UNESCO World Heritage Site. About half the dammed ponds are classified today as reservoirs, but they have now become characteristic features of the Upper Harz and are home to some extremely rare plant and animal species.

The Upper Harz Ponds also have the oldest working dams in Germany.

== Purpose ==
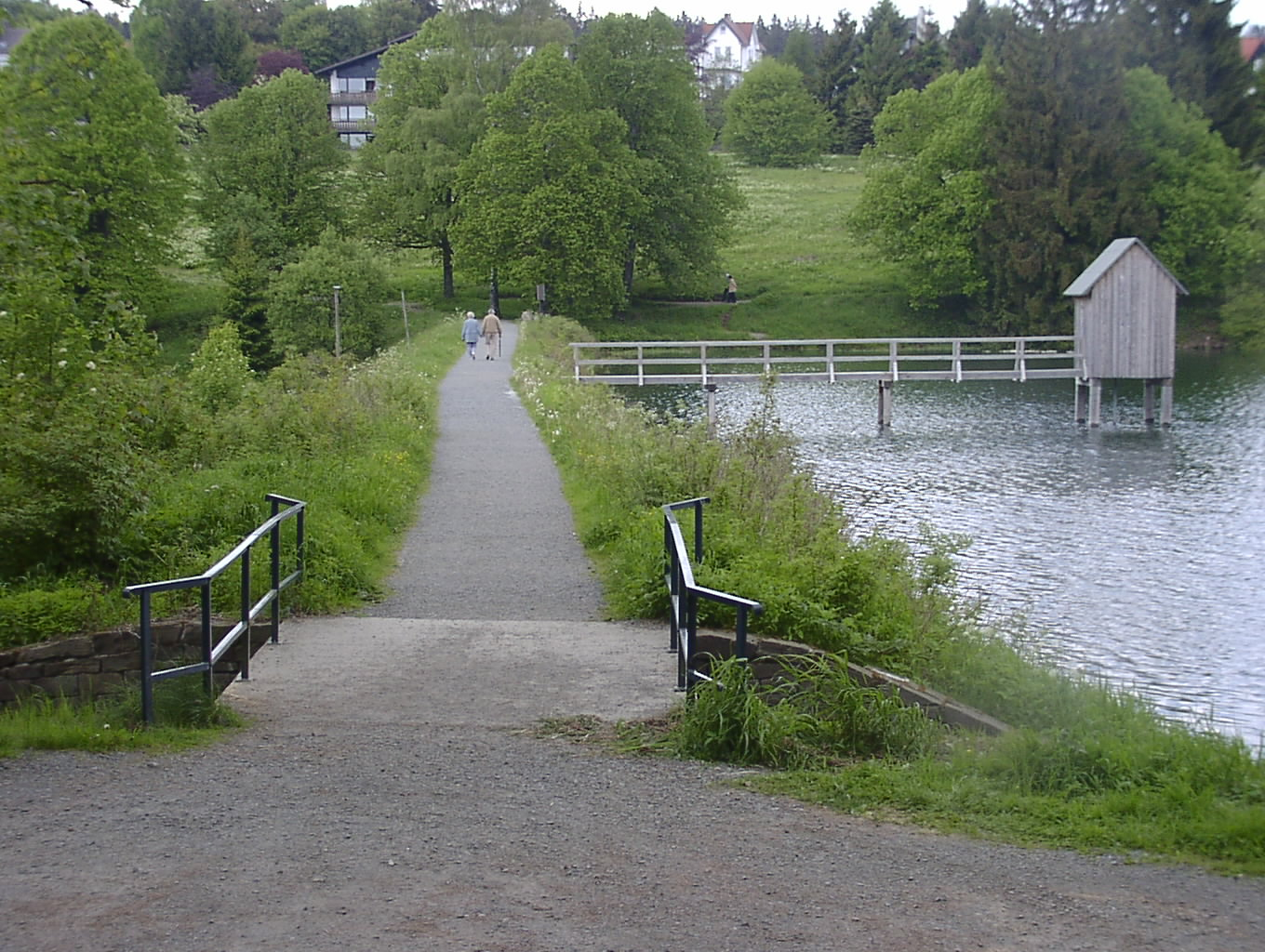
The dam of the Great Crane Pond (Großer Kranicher Teich) near Hahnenklee. The bottom outlet can be operated from the control hut.

The ponds were originally built for storing the water needed to drive the water wheels providing energy to the Upper Harz silver mines. These water wheels drove the pumps, the hoisting equipment, the stamp mills and, from 1820, the man engines as well.

To begin with, the ponds merely impounded water from their natural catchment areas. But in many cases, their inflow was later increased significantly through the use of additional collection ditches.

Today the ponds are operated for several reasons: the protection of historic monuments, rural conservation, nature conservation and recreation. Several ponds also provide flood protection; others are used to supply drinking water.

The operator of the ponds today is the Harzwasserwerke, who also manage six modern dams in the Lower Saxon part of the Harz.

== Design ==
The barriers were built as earth-fill dams, the fill being usually excavated on site. Usually small quarries were established in the terrain earmarked as the future reservoir; this had the added advantage that it increased its eventual capacity. Neither clay nor silt could be used as grouting material because they did not occur in sufficient quantities in the Upper Harz. The Upper Harz miners had, however, learned from experience that grass sods or turves made excellent grouting; by placing them one on top of another, in a similar fashion to building a wall, a layer of sods up to a metre thick would be built into the dam which ensured that it remained watertight.

A wooden conduit (Holzgerenne) acted as a bottom outlet. It was usually made of oak due to its great durability. The valve was a so-called Striegel, which acted like a plug and closed off the inlet to the wooden channels and was operated by rods. Both grass sod grouting and wooden bottom outlets are still in use in many of the ponds.

The dams themselves are between 4 and 15 m high and the impounded volumes varied between 10,000 and 600,000 m^{3}. One notable exception is the Oderteich northeast of Sankt Andreasberg, which is the only pond not grouted with grass turves, but with granite sand known as granitgrus and with a dam height of 21 m and reservoir volume of 1.7 million m³ of water stands head and shoulders above the other ponds in terms of size.

== Flora and fauna ==
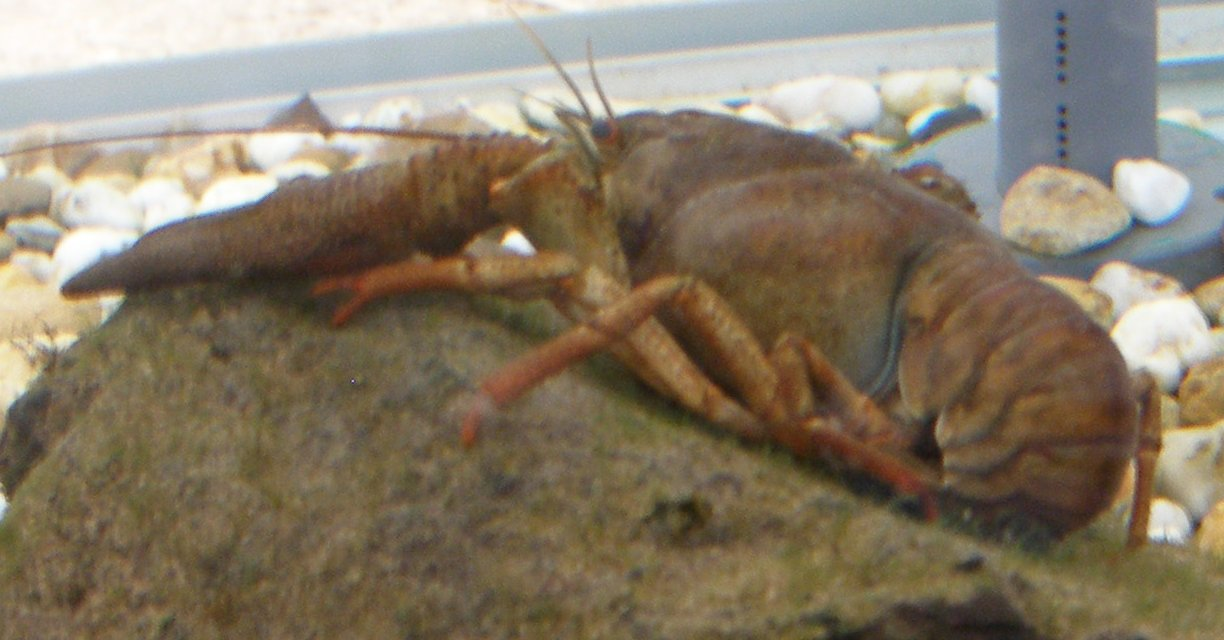
Crayfish

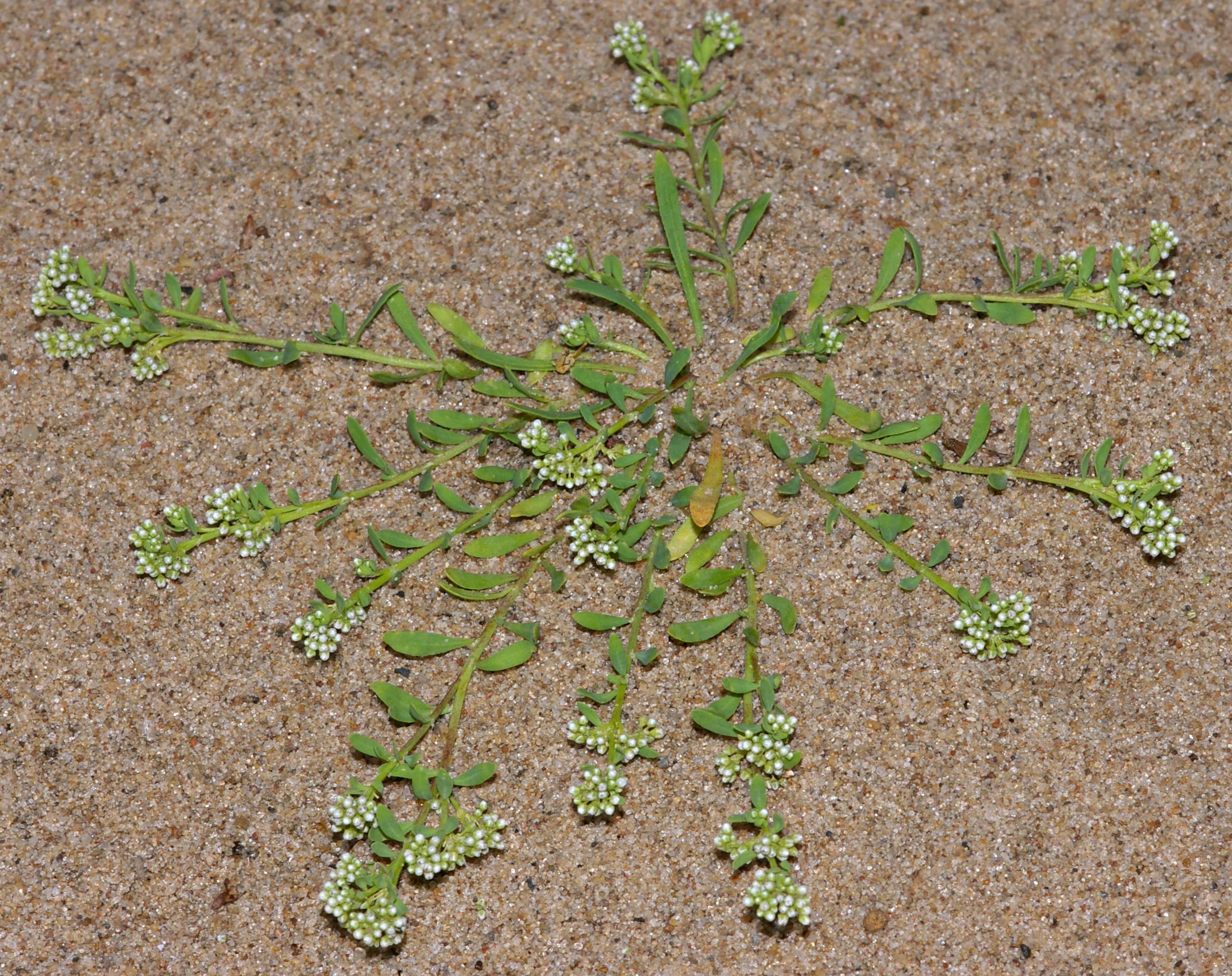
Strapwort in the autumn

Although these water features have been artificially created, rare flora and fauna have evolved in and around many of the Upper Harz ponds. The water is low in nutrients and rather cool. The crayfish, which has died out in most European waterbodies due to crayfish plague, has been able to survive in many Upper Harz Ponds thanks to their isolated locations. Pond operators and fishing leaseholders have worked successfully to increase their numbers.

The operation of the ponds over many centuries with constantly changing levels of water has also created a habitat for some extremely rare plant communities. On the soils of many ponds coral necklace (Ilecebrum verticillatum), strapwort (Corrigiola litoralis) or shoreweed (Littorella uniflora) may be found growing. They are dependent on this constant fluctuation of water levels in the reservoir and so the nature conservation authorities have agreed with the pond operators an operating regime that will secure the existence of these plants in the waterbodies concerned. By other ponds there are meadow bogs (Kleinseggenried), which are rich in sedges, rushes and cottongrass and moss communities.

The fish population is primarily influenced by the angling clubs that lease fishing rights and stock the ponds with fish. Only native species of fish are desired, although eel and catfish are excluded due to their incompatibility with the crayfish populations.

== Table of Upper Harz Ponds ==
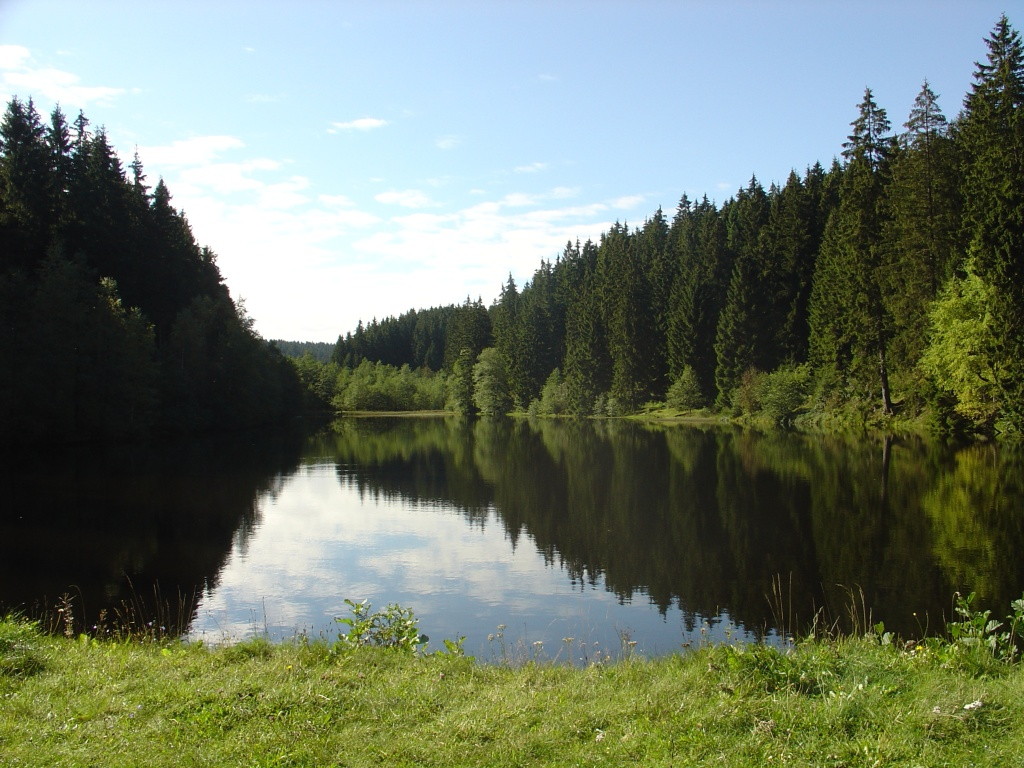
The Smelter Pond (Hüttenteich) near Altenau

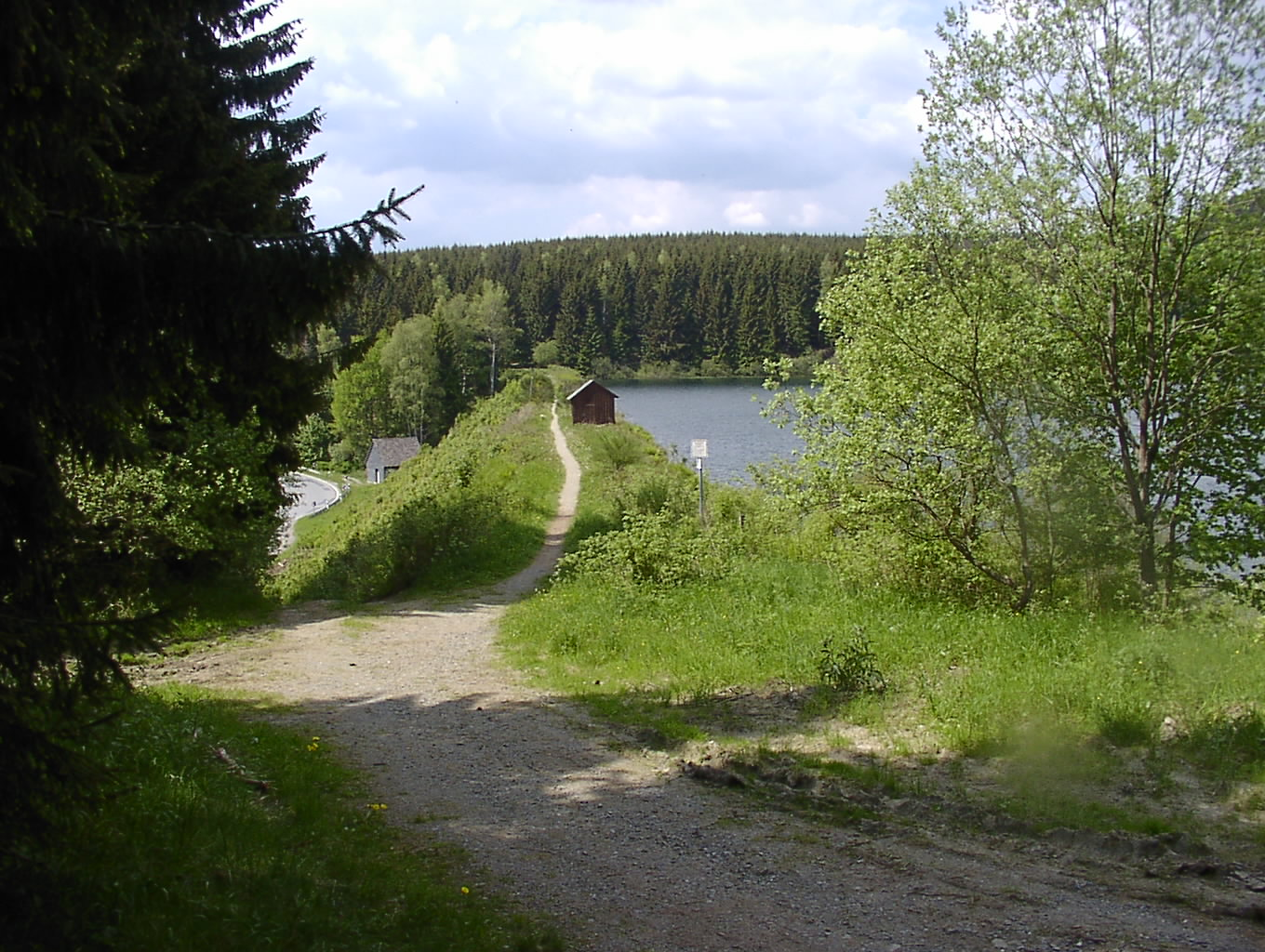
The dam of the Middle Kellerhals Pond north of Zellerfeld is around 15 m high and can impound up to 436,000 m^{3} of water.

The following list includes the majority of the dammed ponds built by the Upper Harz miners, where they are still in operation or where the dam ruins are still clearly visible. Mill ponds are not included. A total of 143 dams and former dams have been documented.

English name	German Name	Built	Capacity in m³	Height above base in m
Old Sandpiper Pond	Alter Wasserläufer Teich	before 1565	32,000	5.30
Capercaillie Pond	Auerhahnteich	1684	61,000	7.74
Bärenbruch Pond	Bärenbrucher Teich	before 1634	186,000	7.09
Carl Pond	Carler Teich	1673	14,000	5.10
Upper Einersberg Pond	Einersberger Teich, Oberer	before 1672	140,000	9.16
Middle Einersberg Pond	Einersberger Teich, Mittlerer	before 1672	16,000	7.74
Lower Einersberg Pond (†)	Einersberger Teich, Unterer (†)			
Duck Marsh	Entensumpf			
Highest Eschenbach Pond (†)	Eschenbacher Teich, Oberster (†)			
Upper Eschenbach Pond	Eschenbacher Teich, Oberer	1548	62,000	10.50
Lower Eschenbach Pond	Eschenbacher Teich, Unterer	1548	167,000	8.85
Eulenspiegel Pond	Eulenspiegler Teich	around 1546	61,000	3.43
Upper Flambach Pond	Flambacher Teich, Oberer	1701	88,000	6.50
Lower Flambach Pond	Flambacher Teich, Unterer	1693	48,000	5.03
Upper Raft Pond	Flößteich, Oberer	before 1680	11,000	5.00
Lower Raft Pond	Flößteich, Unterer	before 1680	10,000	4.28
Flöß Pond (Piß Valley) (†)	Flößteich, (Pißtal)			
Fortune Pond	Fortuner Teich	1721	296,000	14.33
New Grumbach Pond	Grumbacher Teich, Neuer	after 1714	108,000	8.67
Upper Grumbach Pond	Grumbacher Teich, Oberer	before 1680	180,000	10.50
Middle Grumbach Pond	Grumbacher Teich, Mittlerer	after 1680	72,000	9.20
Lower Grumbach Pond	Grumbacher Teich, Unterer	before 1680	82,000	7.52
Haderbach Pond	Haderbacher Teich	before 1693	103,000	9.43
Upper Hahnebalz Pond	Hahnebalzer Teich, Oberer	before 1695	66,000	8.11
Lower Hahnebalz Pond	Hahnebalzer Teich, Unterer	1676/86	52,000	6.50
Hasenbach Pond	Hasenbacher Teich	1660	140,000	9.12
Hare Pond (†)	Hasenteich (†)			
Upper Hausherzberg Pond	Hausherzberger Teich, Oberer	1588	180,000	7.18
Lower Hausherzberg Pond	Hausherzberger Teich, Oberer	before 1613	198,000	9.35
Haus Sachsen Pond	Haus Sachsener Teich			
Herzberg Pond (Goslar)	Herzberger Teich (Goslar)	around 1560	95,000	12.00
God's Help Pond	Hilfe-Gottes-Teich	before 1763	12,300	8.30
Stag Pond	Hirschler Teich	before 1671	599,000	11.40
Smelter Pond, Zellerfeld	Hüttenteich, Zellerfeld	before 1673	13,000	6.42
Smelter Pond, Altenau	Hüttenteich, Altenau	1688	49,000	11.73
Huttal Pond, Upper (†)	Huttaler Teich, Oberer (†)			
Huttal Pond, Lower (†)	Huttaler Teich, Unterer (†)			
Jägersbleek Pond	Jägersbleeker Teich	around 1670	380,000	13.65
Johann Friedrich Pond	Johann-Friedricher Teich	1674	96,000	6.79
Carp Pond (Hahnenklee) (†)	Karpfenteich (Hahnenklee) (†)	before 1680		
Upper Kellerhals Pond	Kellerhalsteich, Oberer	before 1679	68,000	10.78
Middle Kellerhals Pond	Kellerhalsteich, Mittlerer	1724	436,000	14.90
Lower Kellerhals Pond,	Kellerhalsteich, Unterer	before 1679	53,000	8.10
Kiefhölz Pond	Kiefhölzer Teich	before 1671	248,000	9.72
Klein-Clausthal Pond	Klein-Clausthaler Teich	around 1680	29,000	8.34
Little Crane Pond,	Kranicher Teich, Kleiner	before 1675	11,000	2.47
Great Crane Pond,	Kranicher Teich, Großer	before 1675	110,000	8.24
Kreuzbach Pond	Kreuzbacher Teich	before 1680	9,000	5.58
Kuttelbach Pond	Kuttelbacher Teich	1674	163,000	12.75
Lange Pond	Lange Teich	1719	15,000	6.73
Langer Pond	Langer Teich	before 1606	49,000	7.30
Upper Nassenwiese Pond	Nassenwieser Teich, Oberer	around 1671	132,000	8.82
Lower Nassenwiese Pond (†)	Nassenwieser Teich, Unterer (†)	before 1743	48,000	6.0
New Pond (Lautenthal)(†)	Neue Teich (Lautenthal) (†)	after 1680	11,800	5.8
Oder Pond	Oderteich	1715-1721	1,670,000	18.00
Little Oker Pond	Okerteich, Kleiner		22,000	
Upper Peacock Pond	Pfauenteich, Oberer	before 1551	121.000	8.27
Middle Peacock Pond	Pfauenteich, Mittlerer	before 1551	259.000	9.53
Lower Peacock Pond	Pfauenteich, Mittlerer	before 1551	214,000	8.94
Pixhai Pond	Pixhaier Teich	1672	281,000	8.75
Polster Valley Pond	Polstertaler Teich	1728	46,000	6.48
Prince's Pond	Prinzenteich	1686	385,000	8.74
Röhre Pond	Röhrenteich			
Lower Schalke Pond	(Unterer) Schalker Teich	1730	151,000	11.28
Middle Schalke Pond (†)	Schalker Teich, Mittlerer			
Upper Schalke Pond (†)	Schalker Teich, Oberer			
Schlacke Valley Pond	Schlackentaler Teich		3,200	
Schröterbach Pond	Schröterbacher Teich	1652	73,000	9.06
Schwarzenbach Pond	Schwarzenbacher Teich	before 1608	146,000	7.39
Semmelwiese Pond	Semmelwieser Teich	1691	53.000	7.24
Silver Pond	Silberteich	1755	22,000	8.0
Upper Spiegelthal Pond	Spiegelthaler Teich, Oberer	before 1673	51,000	7.67
Lower Spiegelthal Pond	Spiegelthaler Teich, Unterer	1672	152,000	10.91
Stadtweg Pond	Stadtweger Teich	1727	294,000	10.12
Stuffen Valley Pond (†)	Stuffentaler Teich (†)			
Marsh Pond (Buntenbock)	Sumpfteich (Buntenbock)	before 1639	189,000	6.91
Than Pond	Than-Teich	before 1684	12,000	6.45
Sandpiper Pond	Wasserläufer Teich	before 1659	25,000	5.78
Wiesenbeke Pond (Bad Lauterberg)	Wiesenbeker Teich (Bad Lauterberg)	1715	480,000	14.50
Zankwiese Pond	Zankwieser Teich	1688	107,000	9.67
Upper Mine Pond	Zechenteich, Oberer	before 1661	33,000	5.85
Middle Mine Pond	Zechenteich, Mittlerer	before 1661	45,000	6.70
Ziegenberg Pond	Ziegenberger Teich	around 1645	313,000	8.94

(†) means: pond out of service, largely dry. Dam remains exist.

Where no data is given, this usually indicates that the pond ended up in other hands before the mines closed and has not been precisely documented.

== See also ==
- Upper Harz
- Upper Harz Water Regale
- Upper Harz Water Tunnels
- Upper Harz Ditches
- List of lakes in Germany
- Kunstteich

== Sources ==
- Friedrich, Ernst Andreas (1982): Gestaltete Naturdenkmale Niedersachsens, Landbuch-Verlag, Hannover 1982. ISBN 3-7842-0256-X
