= Braunlage Nude Sledging World Championship =

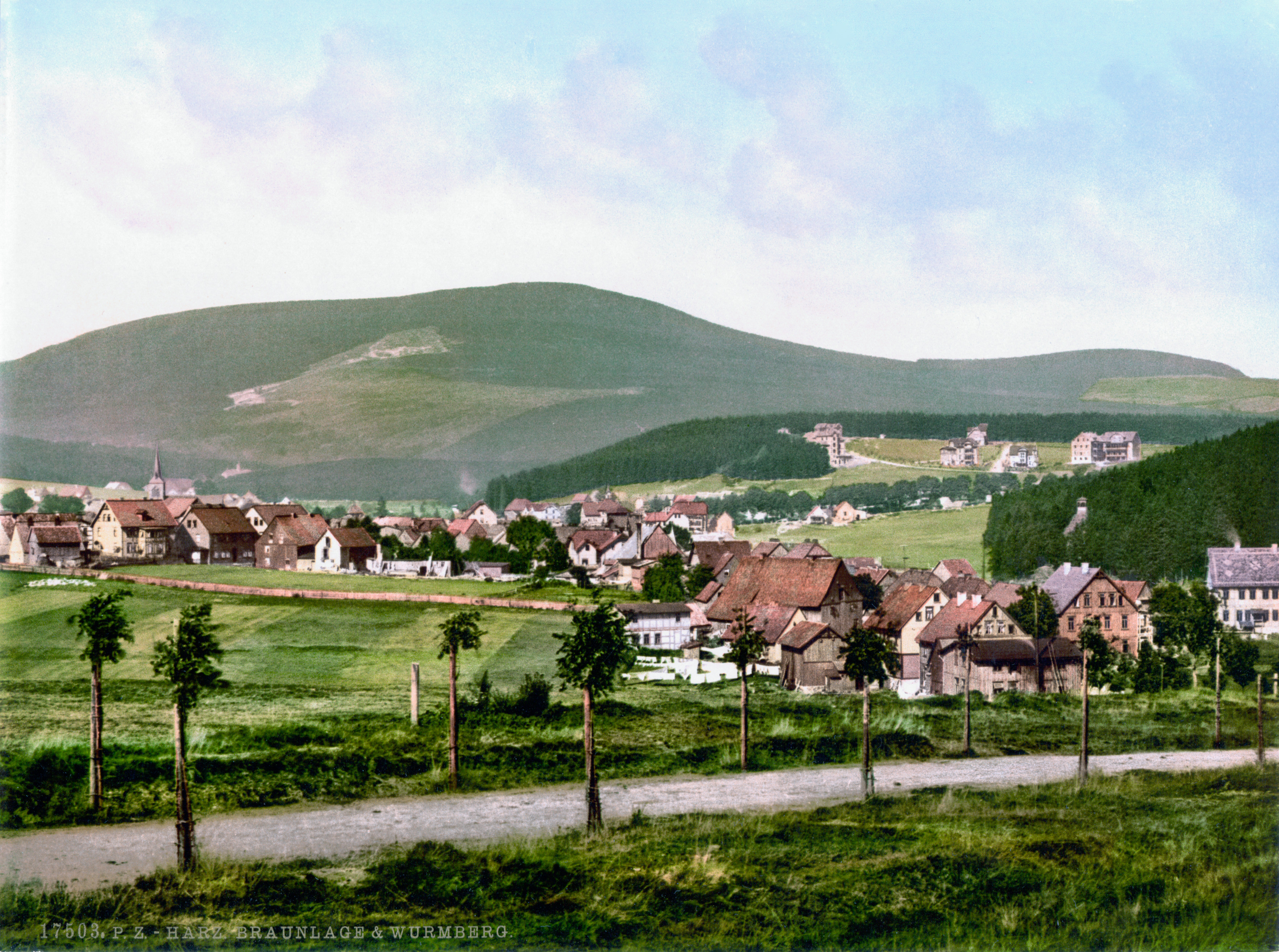
Braunlage, Germany

The Braunlage Nude Sledging World Championship (German: Braunlage Nackt Rodeln Weltmeisterschaft) was held between 2009 and 2012 in February in the city of Braunlage, Germany. The event was discontinued because of too much affluence of onlookers.
