= Brunnenbach (Lochbach) =

River in Germany

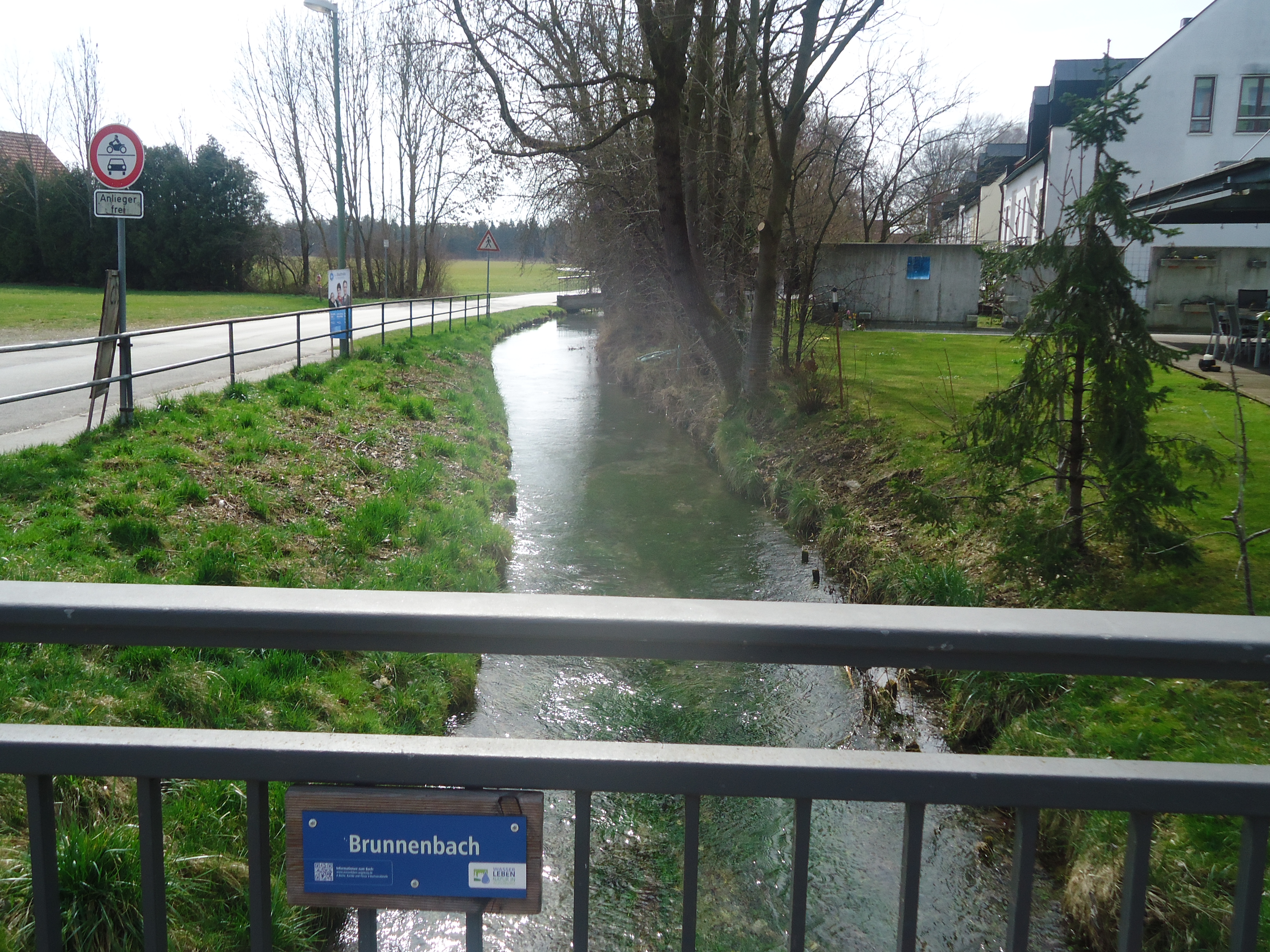
- The Brunnenbach in Haunstetten

Location
- Country: Germany
- State: Bavaria

Physical characteristics
- Source
  - location: in the Augsburg Municipal Forest
  - coordinates: 48°17′22″N 10°54′42″E
- Mouth
  - location: right tributary of the Lochbach at the wayside halt of Haunstetter Straße in Augsburg
  - coordinates: 48°21′15.7″N 10°54′10.1″E
- Length: 10 km (6.2 mi)

Basin features
- Progression: Lochbach→ Lech→ Danube→ Black Sea
- Landmarks: Cities: Augsburg

Brunnenbach is a river of Bavaria, Germany.

In earlier centuries, from at least 1412, the Brunnenbach supplied the city of Augsburg with drinking water. It originates in several springs in the Lech meadows south of the city. In the post-glacial period, great groundwater streams pushed the alluvial gravels of the Lechfeld northwards, feeding springs in many places from which streams flowed northwards. These headstreams were traditionally called Gießer by the locals.

One stream formed from the waters of several of these springs, whose water was clean enough for supplying the growing city, was called the Brunnenbach ("Spring Stream"). The stream was diverted into the city and fed many public wells and private water systems in Augsburg via a water works and water towers.

Today, drinking water is no longer extracted from the Brunnenbach. It flows, as before, through the Augsburg Municipal Forest, but now empties into the Lech Canal in front of the Red Gate (Rotes Tor). This then crosses the quarter Lechviertel and merges with the other Lech canals in the north of the city, before discharging into the Lech.

== Sources ==
- Wilhelm Ruckdeschl with Klaus Luther (1984), Technische Denkmale in Augsburg (in German), Augsburg: Brigitte Settele Verlag
- Wilhelm Ruckdeschl (2004), Industriekultur in Augsburg (in German), Augsburg: Brigitte Settele Verlag, ISBN 3-932939-44-1
