= Buntenbock =

Coordinates: 51°46′44″N 10°20′01″E

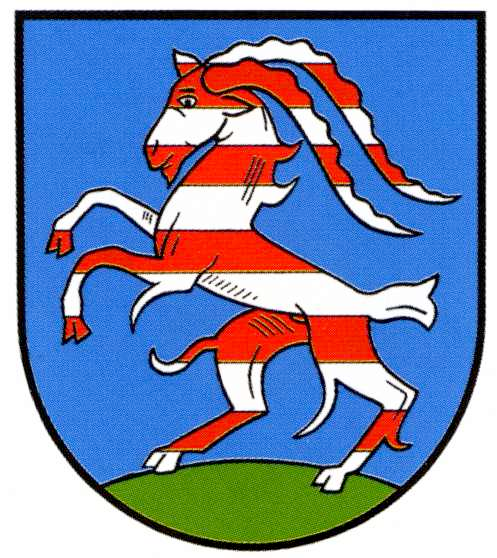
Coat of arms of Buntenbock

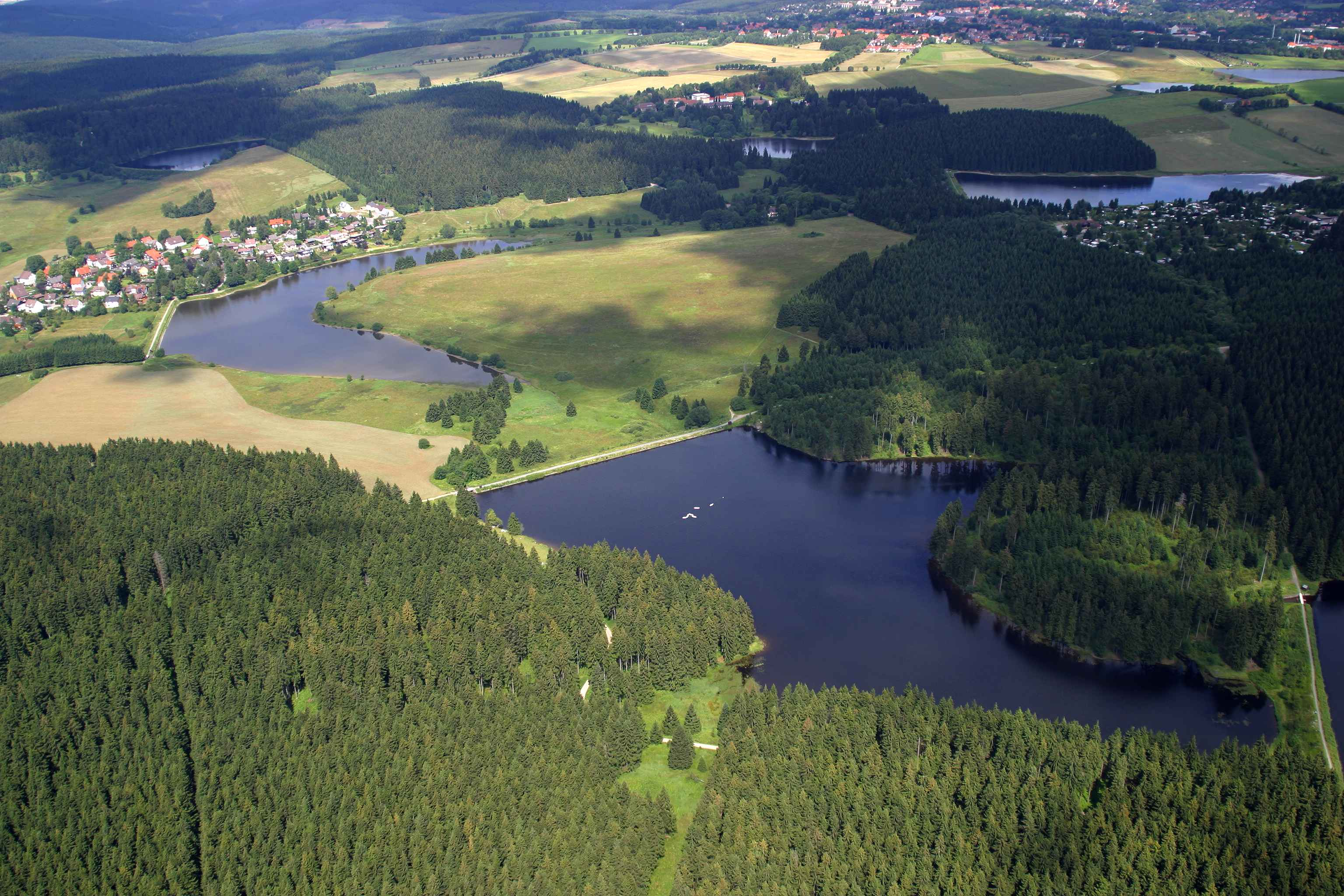
Location of Buntenbock (top left) in the middle of reservoirs in the Upper Harz Water Regale

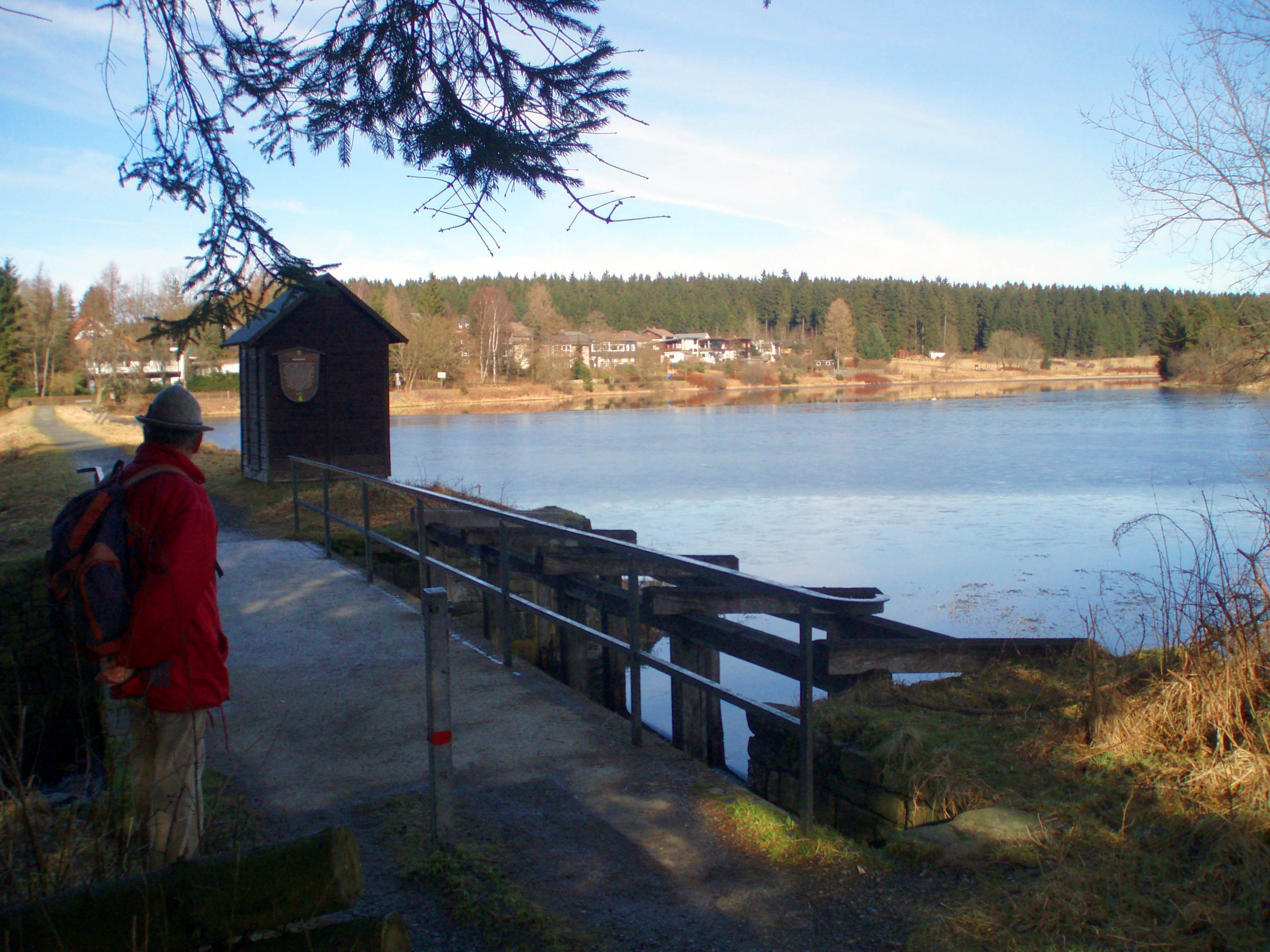
The Sumpfteich near Buntenbock

The small village of Buntenbock (German pronunciation: [ˈbʊntn̩bɔk]) lies on the plateau of the Harz mountains in Germany and is part of the mining and university town of Clausthal-Zellerfeld. It is a state-recognised climatic health resort and has accommodation for 200 visitors as well as 700 inhabitants.

The village lies on the Innerste at a height of 550–600 m above sea level. Surrounded by meadows, woods and numerous lakes (see Upper Harz Ponds), it is a base for all sorts of leisure activities such as hiking, cycling, fishing, swimming and, in winter, cross-country skiing. From the Kuckholzklippe observation tower there is an impressive view over the mountains to the Harz Foreland. In the nearby refuge hut is a checkpoint (no. 139) on the Harzer Wandernadel hiking network.

== Points of interest ==
=== Regular events ===
- Cattle and Sheep Day (mid-August)
- Buntenbock Folk Festival and Schützenfest (end of August)

== Tourism ==
Tourism has played an important role in Buntenbock for a good 100 years. In the early days it was advertised as a healthy place to recover from illness due to its mountain air. Buntenbock lay on important transport routes and was traditionally a village of carters, who mainly worked for the mines. The keeping of domestic animals, particularly horses and goats, stems from that time. In the cheese dairy of Buntenbock's goat farm (Ziegenhof), goat's milk is processed into products such as the aromatic Buntenböcker Ziegenkäse goat's cheese. In the area around Buntenbock are numerous lakes from the mining era, which are used for swimming in summer and skating in winter. In and around Buntenbock there are many walking trails, which include the Harzer Hexenstieg that passes nearby. The village has a small spa park where, from April to September, there is a village market every fortnight on a Wednesday. In winter there is tobogganing and cross-country skiing on Buntenbock's local mountain, the Ziegenberg.
