= Braunlage =

Place in Lower Saxony, Germany

- Town
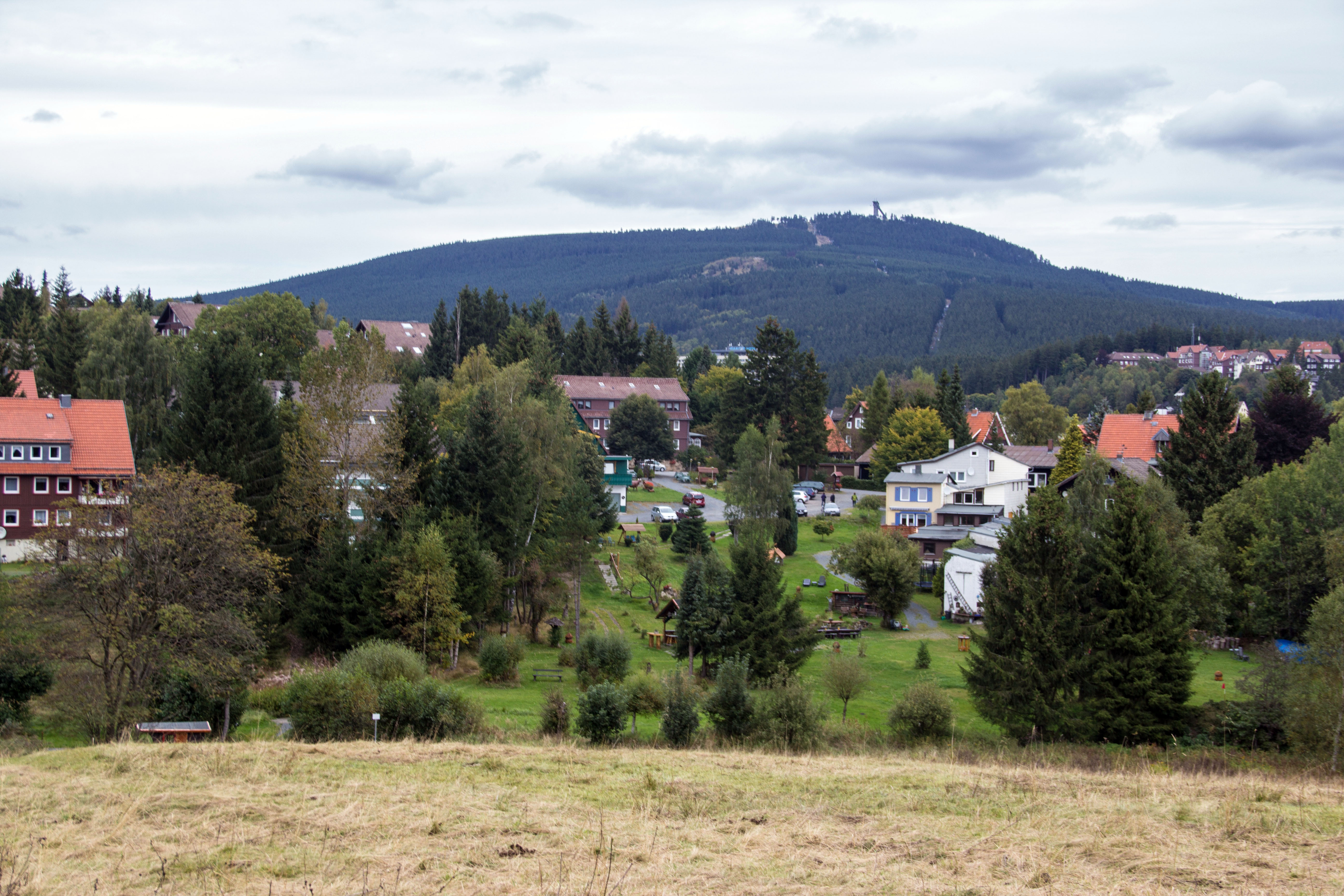
- Braunlage with the Wurmberg mountain behind

- Coat of arms

- Location of Braunlage within Goslar district
- Interactive map of Braunlage
- Location within Germany Location within Lower Saxony
- Coordinates: 51°43′37″N 10°36′43″E
- Country: Germany
- State: Lower Saxony
- District: Goslar
- Subdivisions: 3 districts

Government
  - Mayor (2019–24): Wolfgang Langer

Area
  - Total: 31.65 km^{2} (12.22 sq mi)
- Elevation: 560 m (1,840 ft)

Population (2025-12-31)
  - Total: 4,767
  - Density: 150.6/km^{2} (390.1/sq mi)
- Time zone: UTC+01:00 (CET)
  - Summer (DST): UTC+02:00 (CEST)
- Postal codes: 38700
- Dialling codes: 05520
- Vehicle registration: GS, BRL, CLZ
- Website: www.braunlage.org

Braunlage (German pronunciation: [bʁaʊnˈlaːɡə]) is a town and health resort in the Goslar district of Lower Saxony in Germany. Situated within the Harz mountain range, south of the Brocken massif, Braunlage's main business is tourism, particularly skiing. Nearby ski resorts include the Sonnenberg and the slopes on the Wurmberg.

== Geography ==
Braunlage is located on the Warme Bode, a headstream of the river Bode, close to the border with Elend in the state of Saxony-Anhalt. The municipal area stretches along the south-eastern rim of the Harz National Park from an elevation of 550 m (1,800 ft) up to 971 m (3,186 ft) at the summit of the Wurmberg. Other peaks in the vicinity include the Achtermannshöhe and the Hahnenklee Crags.

=== Districts ===
The town consists of three districts:

- Braunlage proper
- Hohegeiß*, incorporated on 1 July 1972
- Sankt Andreasberg**, incorporated on 1 November 2011

* with the village of Königskrug
** with the villages of Sonnenberg, Oderhaus, Oderbrück, Oderberg, Odertaler Sägemühle and Silberhütte

=== Transportation ===
Braunlage is on the Bundesstraße B4 between Braunschweig and Nordhausen and the B27 from Blankenburg to Göttingen.

Local buses run between Braunlage and the nearby communities of Bad Harzburg, Sankt Andreasberg, Schierke, Wernigerode, Hohegeiß, Bad Sachsa, Nordhausen, Bad Lauterberg, Herzberg and Clausthal-Zellerfeld.

Braunlage used to be served by the South Harz Railway Company, which provided a link to the Harz Narrow Gauge Railways via Sorge, but service ceased in 1958.

== Climate ==
Climate data for Braunlage, (elevation 607 m (1,991 ft) (1991−2020 normals)
Month	Jan	Feb	Mar	Apr	May	Jun	Jul	Aug	Sep	Oct	Nov	Dec	Year
Record high °C (°F)	13.9 (57.0)	15.1 (59.2)	19.8 (67.6)	25.9 (78.6)	28.1 (82.6)	30.8 (87.4)	32.6 (90.7)	32.8 (91.0)	30.3 (86.5)	24.3 (75.7)	18.8 (65.8)	14.1 (57.4)	32.8 (91.0)
Mean daily maximum °C (°F)	1.2 (34.2)	2.0 (35.6)	5.5 (41.9)	11.2 (52.2)	15.0 (59.0)	18.2 (64.8)	20.5 (68.9)	20.2 (68.4)	15.5 (59.9)	10.4 (50.7)	5.4 (41.7)	2.0 (35.6)	10.6 (51.1)
Daily mean °C (°F)	−1.2 (29.8)	−0.8 (30.6)	1.9 (35.4)	6.3 (43.3)	10.4 (50.7)	13.5 (56.3)	15.7 (60.3)	15.3 (59.5)	11.3 (52.3)	7.0 (44.6)	2.8 (37.0)	−0.3 (31.5)	6.8 (44.2)
Mean daily minimum °C (°F)	−3.5 (25.7)	−3.5 (25.7)	−1.4 (29.5)	2.0 (35.6)	5.8 (42.4)	8.9 (48.0)	11.1 (52.0)	10.9 (51.6)	7.6 (45.7)	4.0 (39.2)	0.5 (32.9)	−2.4 (27.7)	3.3 (37.9)
Record low °C (°F)	−23.9 (−11.0)	−25.6 (−14.1)	−18.0 (−0.4)	−11.0 (12.2)	−4.1 (24.6)	−0.6 (30.9)	2.7 (36.9)	2.6 (36.7)	−0.4 (31.3)	−8.2 (17.2)	−14.0 (6.8)	−22.8 (−9.0)	−25.6 (−14.1)
Average precipitation mm (inches)	158.4 (6.24)	104.1 (4.10)	114.5 (4.51)	65.5 (2.58)	88.4 (3.48)	84.8 (3.34)	105.9 (4.17)	94.4 (3.72)	104.8 (4.13)	123.1 (4.85)	123.9 (4.88)	155.9 (6.14)	1,303.4 (51.31)
Average precipitation days (≥ 0.1 mm)	19.6	18.2	18.3	13.8	15.4	15.5	16.9	15.5	15.3	17.8	19.5	21.6	205.2
Average relative humidity (%)	90.0	86.0	82.4	74.8	74.1	75.3	75.0	76.1	82.2	87.6	90.8	91.2	82.3
Mean monthly sunshine hours	48.0	66.5	113.6	162.8	187.3	190.7	197.7	185.3	131.1	94.8	46.8	38.3	1,447.8
Source 1: NOAA
Source 2:

== History ==
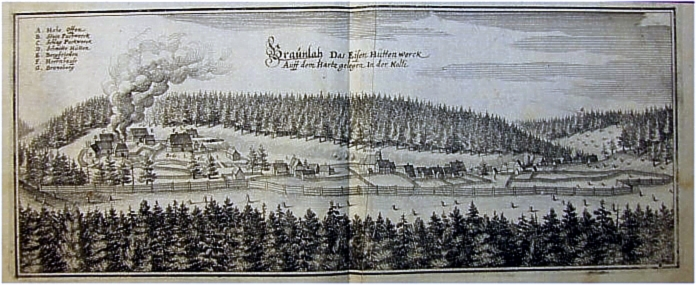
Braunlage ironworks, 1654 engraving by Matthäus Merian

First mentioned as Brunla in 1227, the town started out as a pit settlement in the Harz forests. It appeared as Brunenlo in a 1253 register of the Saxon counts of Regenstein and was revived when their successors, the Counts of Blankenburg, established an ironworks here in 1561. With the extinction of the Blankenburg dynasty in 1599 Braunlage fell to the Dukes of Brunswick-Wolfenbüttel.

In the 17th century it was a small Brunswick market town in the west corner of the former Blankenburg lands. Tourism developed from the late 19th century onwards and other branches of business were forestry and a large granite quarry on the Wurmberg. Around 1910 one of the first interurban bus lines ran from Bad Harzburg up to Braunlage, served by Büssing vehicles. The Wurmberg Ski Jumps were erected in 1922 (demolished in 2014). In 1934 Braunlage received town privileges and municipal status as a health resort.

After World War II Braunlage was close to the fortified inner German border through the Harz mountains. In 1963 it became the location of the Wurmberg Gondola Lift, today with a length of 2.8 kilometres (1.7 mi) and a height difference of 400 m (1,300 ft) to the summit station the longest in Northern Germany. On 7 May 1964 Gerhard Zucker demonstrated a flight of mail rockets on the Hasselkopf hill. One of them exploded, killing two spectators.

Since German reunification in 1990 Braunlage has again been in the centre of the Harz tourist region but it has had to cope with growing competition from the neighbouring resorts in Saxony-Anhalt.

=== Demographics ===
Population statistics

Year	Inhabitants
1821	1,691
1848	2,473
1871	2,288
1885	2,489
1905	3,408
1925	4,520

Year	Inhabitants
1933	4,893
1939	4,981
1946	9,489
1950	9,334
1956	7,523

Year	Inhabitants
1961	7,163
1968	7,716
1970	7,249
1975	7,266
1980	7,140

Year	Inhabitants
1985	6,776
1990	6,148
1995	5,998
2000	5,476
2005	5,142

== Politics ==
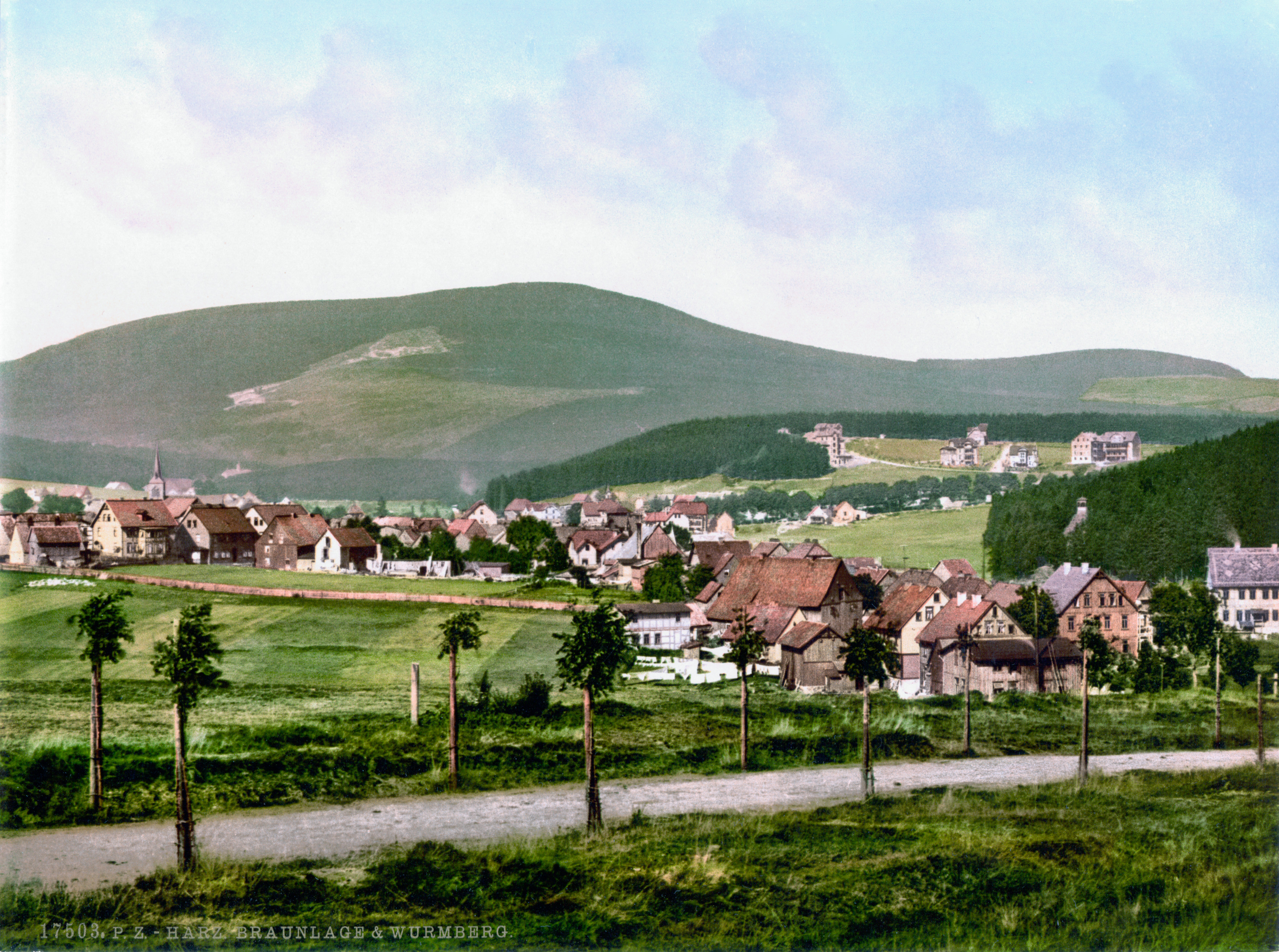
Wurmberg around 1900

=== Town council ===
Seats in the town council (Stadtrat) as of 2016 local elections:

- Christian Democratic Union (CDU): 7
- Bürgerliste (independent): 5
- Social Democratic Party of Germany (SPD): 4

== Culture and sights ==
A museum of local history covers Braunlage's tradition as a health resort and official venue of the International Ski Federation (FIS). The townscape includes extensive spa gardens

=== Sports ===
The local ice-hockey team Harzer Wölfe is an important part of the north German ice-hockey culture.

There used to be several ski jumps on the Wurmberg, which hosted international competitions such as the FIS Ski Jumping Continental Cup until 2011. Between 2009 and 2012 the Braunlage Nude Sledging World Championships were held.

=== Sights ===
The Silberteich and the Hahnenkleeklippen on the way to Sankt Andreasberg are popular tourist destinations.

The Dicke Tannen is a protected landscape of giant spruce trees near Hohegeiß.
