= List of mountains and hills of the Harz =

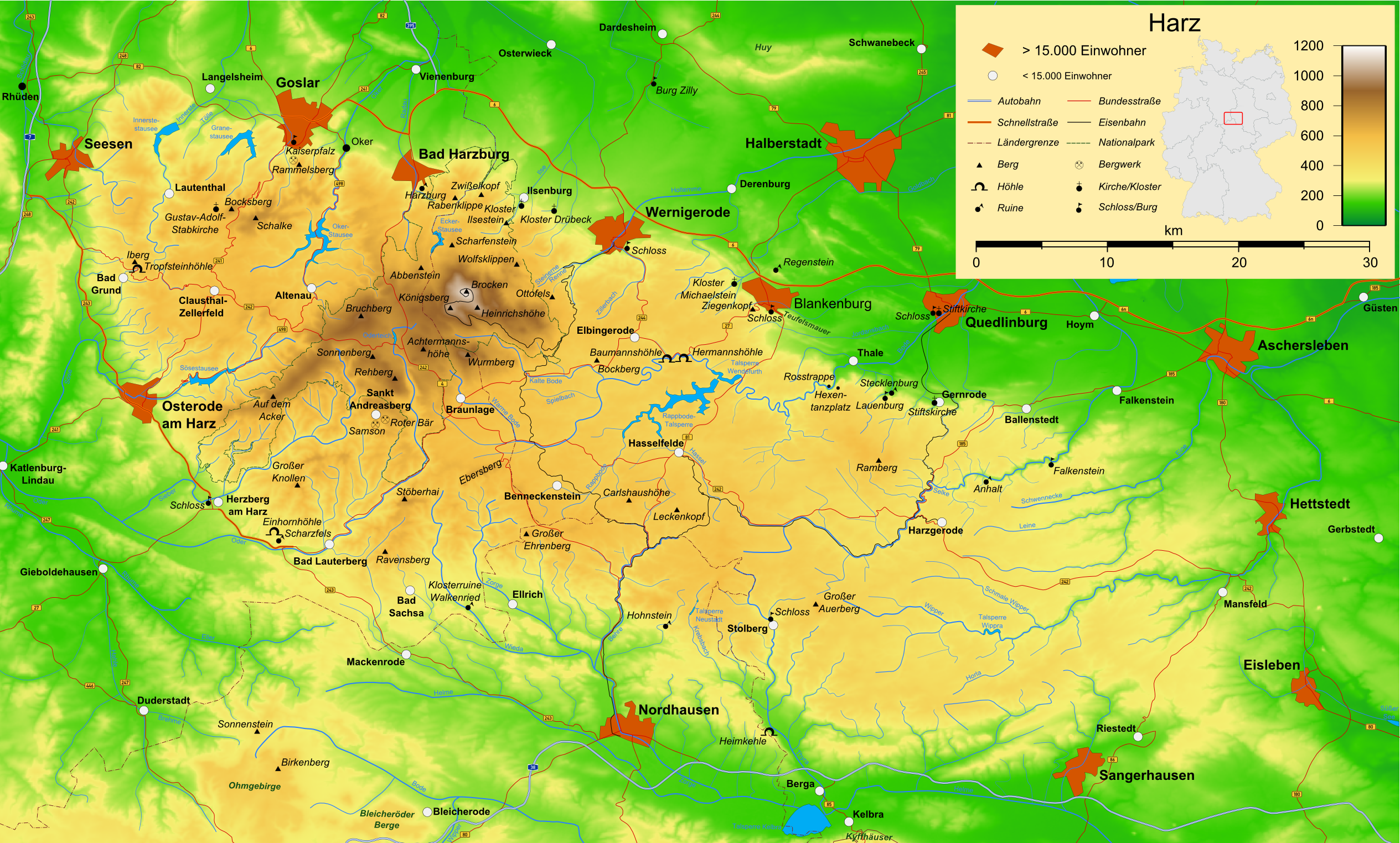
Topography of the Harz

This list of mountains and hills in the Harz contains a selection of mountains, hills, high points and their outliers in the Harz Mountains of Germany. The Harz is part of the German Central Uplands and a natural region main unit (number D37) in the states of Lower Saxony, Saxony-Anhalt and Thuringia. The list includes the mountains and hills of the Harz National Park and the nature parks of Harz (Lower Saxony), Harz/Saxony-Anhalt and the South Harz. Hills in the South Harz Karst Landscape Biosphere Reserve, the Harz regions of Alter Stolberg, Mansfeld Land, Ramberg and Rüdigsdorf Switzerland are also included.

→ see also: Harzklippen for a list of rock formations, including tors and crags.

The table is sorted by elevations in metres above sea level referred to Normalnull (NN), except where indicated, according to the BfN). Several columns in the table are sortable by clicking on the symbols in the header. In the column “Mountain, hills, high point”, alternative names are given in brackets and in small, italicized text. In these columns, where the same name occurs more than once, it is distinguished by location names in small text in brackets.

A key to the abbreviations used in the table is given below.

Mountain, hill or high point	Height (m)	Location in Harz area, national park (NLP) or nature park (NRP)	Towns or villages in the vicinity	County or unincorp. area (for abbr. see below)	State (for abbr. see below)	Points of interest e.g.: sights, nearby rivers or streams, springs, (whether located in/by a: BR, NR)	Image
Brocken (Großer Brocken; Blocksberg)	1,141.1	Upper Harz (High Harz); Harz NLP, Harz/S-A NRP	Ilsenburg, Schierke, Wernigerode	HZ	S-A	Brocken Railway, The Brockenhotel inn (hotel, restaurant), The Brocken House (visitor centre, museum), Brandklippe, Kahle Klippe, Brocken Transmitter, Weather station, The Wolkenhäuschen, former location of 2 listening posts of the USSR (GRU) and GDR (MfS); Nearby : S: Ecker, S: Große Bode, S: Ilse, S: Kalte Bode	View from Torfhaus to the Brockengipfel
Heinrichshöhe (subpeak of the Brocken)	1,045	Upper Harz (High Harz); Harz NLP, Harz/S-A NRP	Ilsenburg, Schierke, Wernigerode	HZ	S-A	Brocken Railway (runs past), Brockenteich, Brockentor-Klippe; S: Ilse	The Brockentor: a tor on the Heinrichshöhe
Königsberg (Wernigerode); (subpeak of the Brocken)	1,033.5	Upper Harz (High Harz); Harz NLP, Harz/S-A NRP	Ilsenburg, Schierke, Wernigerode	HZ	S-A	Brocken Railway (runs past), many granite tors (e. g. Gipfelklippe, Hirschhornklippen, Kanzelklippe, Schluftkopfklippe, Stangenklippe), S: Ecker, S: Kalte Bode	View from the Brocken to the Königsberg
Kleiner Brocken (subpeak of the Brocken) (Wernigerode)	1,018.4	Upper Harz (High Harz); Harz NLP, Harz/S-A NRP	Ilsenburg, Schierke, Wernigerode	HZ	S-A	S: Morgenbrodsbach	
Wurmberg	971.2	Upper Harz (High Harz); Harz NRP (LS)	Braunlage	GS	LS	Hexentreppe ("Witches' Staircase"), Wurmbergklippen (Gr. and Kl. Wurmbergklippe), Wurmberg NR, Wurmbergbaude inn, winter sports area (incl: toboggan run/ toboggan house, ski lifts/pistes), Wurmberg ski jumps (with observation platform), Wurmberg Gondola Lift), Former location of a US surveillance tower; S: Bremke	View from a train on the Brocken Railway of the Wurmberg and Wurmberg Ski Jump
Renneckenberg	933	Upper Harz (High Harz); Harz NLP, Harz/S-A NRP	Schierke, Wernigerode	HZ	S-A	Kapellenklippe, Brockenkinderklippe, Zeterklippen; S: Holtemme, S: Wormke	The Brockenkinderklippe tor on the Renneckenberg
Bruchberg	927	Upper Harz (High Harz); Harz NLP	Altenau, Torfhaus	UA-GS; GS	LS	Okerstein, Skikreuz, Steile Wand, Wolfswarte; Clausthaler Flutgraben, S: Sieber, S (near): Große Söse	View roughly from the direction of Altenau to the Bruchberg
Achtermannshöhe (Achtermann, Uchteneshoge, Uchtenhoch)	924.7	Upper Harz (High Harz); Harz NLP	Braunlage, Torfhaus	UA-GS; GS	LS	Achtermannstor, Breitesteinklippen; Oderteich, S: Kleine Bode, S: Oder	View from the Rehberg to the Achtermannshöhe with buildings on the Brocken in the background
Pferdekopf (Schierke) (subpeak of the Renneckenberg)	920	Upper Harz (High Harz); Harz NLP, Harz/S-A NRP	Schierke, Wernigerode	HZ	S-A	Kapellenklippe; S: Holtemme, S: Ilse, S: Wormke	
Großer Winterberg	906.4	Upper Harz (High Harz); Harz NLP, Harz/S-A NRP	Schierke	HZ	S-A	near: S: Bremke	View over the bottom of the Wurmberg Ski Jump to the Großer Winterberg; the treeless strip to the left indicates the course of the old Inner German Border; rear right is the edge of Schierke
Hohnekamm (Hohneklippen)	900.6	Upper Harz (High Harz); Harz NLP, Harz/S-A NRP	Schierke, Wernigerode	HZ	S-A	Hohneklippen (Bärenklippe, Grenzklippe, Höhlenklippe, Leistenklippe & Trudenstein), Hohnekopf, near: Hohensteinklippen, near: Ottofels; S: Zillierbach	Hohnekamm: View from the Leistenklippe to the Grenzklippe; in the background the Brocken
Rehberg	893	Upper Harz (High Harz); Harz NLP	St. Andreasberg	UA-GS; GS	LS	Rehberger Graben and Grabenhaus	South flank of the Rehberg taken from the Jordanshöhe in Sankt Andreasberg
Quitschenberg	881.5	Upper Harz (High Harz); Harz NLP	Torfhaus	UA-GS; GS	LS	Hopfensäcke (Klippen), Luisenklippe, Quitschenbergklippen; Abbegraben; S (near): Abbe	
Auf dem Acker	865.1	Upper Harz (High Harz); Harz NLP	Herzberg, Osterode, St. Andreasberg	UA-OHA; OHA	LS	Numerous tors and crags (e.g. the Hanskühnenburgklippe), Hanskühnenburg; S: Goldenke, S: Große Kulmke, S: Große Lonau, S: Große Söse, S: Kleine Kulmke, S: Kleine Steinau, S: Schwarze Kulmke, S: Verlorene Kulmke	The Reitstieg on Auf dem Acker
Sonnenberg; Großer Sonnenberg: Kleiner Sonnenberg:	853.4; 853.4; 853.0	Upper Harz; Harz NLP	Braunlage, St. Andreasberg	UA-GS; GS	LS	Winter sports area	View from the Bundesstraße 242 to the north flank of the Großer Sonnenberg
Erdbeerkopf	847.7	Upper Harz; Harz NLP, Harz/S-A NRP	Schierke, Wernigerode	HZ	S-A	Brocken Railway (runs past); S: Wormke	
Kleiner Winterberg	837.0	Upper Harz; Harz NLP, Harz/S-A NRP	Schierke	HZ	S-A	S: Bremke	
Lerchenköpfe (Lärchenköpfe); North top: South top:	821.0 821.0; 801	Upper Harz; Harz NLP	Torfhaus	UA-GS; GS	LS	Torfhaus/Harz Transmitter, winter sports area; Abbegraben, Flörichshaier Graben, S: Radau	
Dehnenkopf	773.6	Upper Harz; Harz NLP	Torfhaus	UA-GS; GS	LS	Jungfernklippe; S: Kalbe	
Schalke	762	Upper Harz; Harz NRP (LS)	Clausthal-Zellerfeld, Hahnenklee, Schulenberg	UA-GS; GS	LS	Schalke OT, until 2003 there was a: surveillance tower; S: Abzucht, S: Schalke	View from Zellerfeld to the Schalke, in the foreground the Stadtweger Teich
Abbenstein	769	Upper Harz; Harz NLP	Torfhaus	UA-GS; GS	LS	Dam of the Ecker Reservoir; S: Fuhler Lohnbach	
Hohe Wand	758.0	Upper Harz; Harz NLP, Harz/S-A NRP	Hasserode, Schierke, Wernigerode	HZ	S-A	Ohrenklippen; S: Chaussee Bach	
Haspelkopf (subpeak of Auf dem Acker)	749	Upper Harz, Harz NLP, Harz NRP (LS)	Riefensbeek, Sieber	UA-OHA; OHA	LS	Sophienklippe, Spießerklippe (q. v. Auf dem Acker); S: Große Steinau, S: Kleine Lonau	
Kuppe	729.1	Upper Harz; Harz NRP (LS)	Sankt Andreasberg	UA-GS; GS	LS	Glückaufklippen; near: Siebertal NR; S: Sperrlutter	
Bocksberg	726	Upper Harz; Harz NRP (LS)	Hahnenklee	GS	LS	Brockenblick OT, Bocksberg Hut inn, Bocksberg Cable Car, transmission tower, summer rodelbahn, winter sports area, Former location of a bob and luge run; S: Gose, S: Grane, S: Grumbach	West side of the Bocksberg with the Kranicher Teich and village of Hahnenklee in the foreground
Jordanshöhe	723	Upper Harz; Harz NRP (LS)	Sankt Andreasberg	GS	LS	Bergwiesen bei St. Andreasberg NR, Jordanshöhe Geological Educational Path (Gesteinskundlicher Lehrpfad Jordanshöhe), Jordanshöhe youth hostel, Glückaufklippen; S: Sperrlutter	
Stöberhai (The Brocken of the South Harz)	720	South Harz; Harz NRP (LS)	Bad Lauterberg, Wieda	UA-OHA; OHA	LS	communication tower, Former location of the Berghotel Stöberhai, Former location of a Bundeswehr surveillance tower; Dam of the Oder Reservoir, S: Steinaer Bach	View from the Oder dam of the Stöberhai (centre)
Schlufterkopf (east of the Sieber)	715.2	South Harz; Harz NLP	Sieber, Sonnenberg	UA-GS; OHA, GS	LS		
Großer Breitenberg	711	Upper Harz, Harz NLP, Harz NRP (LS)	Riefensbeek	UA-OHA; OHA	LS	Sergeantenklippe; near: Dam of the Söse Reservoir	
Wolfsklippen	710	Upper Harz; Harz NLP, Harz/S-A NRP	Drei Annen Hohne, Plessenburg	HZ	S-A	Wolfsklippen OT; S: Tänntalbach (Rammelsbach)	Aussichtsgerüst/-turm auf den Wolfsklippen
Jagdkopf (subpeak of the Stöberhai)	701.2	Upper Harz; Harz NRP (LS)	Odertal, Wieda	UA-OHA; OHA	LS	S: Steinaer Bach	
Schlufterkopf (west of the Sieber)	700	South Harz; Harz NLP	Sieber, Sonnenberg	UA-OHA; OHA, GS	LS		
Riesenbachskopf	699.5	Upper Harz; Harz NRP (LS)	Schulenberg	UA-GS; GS	LS	S (near): Abzucht (Wintertalbach), S: Riesenbach	
Scharfenstein (Ilsenburg)	697.6	Upper Harz; Harz NLP, Harz/S-A NRP	Ilsenburg	HZ	S-A	near: the dam of the Ecker Reservoir; ranger station, Scharfensteinklippe	Scharfenstein with ranger station in the foreground
Barenberg (Bärenberg)	695.5	Upper Harz; Harz/S-A NRP	Elend, Schierke	HZ	S-A	Mäuseklippe, Scherstorklippen, Schnarcherklippen	
Altetalskopf	693.4	Upper Harz; Harz NRP (LS)	Schulenberg	UA-GS; GS	LS	S: Lange Bramke, S: Riesenbach	
Großer Knollen	687.4	South Harz; Harz NRP (LS)	Bad Lauterberg, Sieber	UA-OHA; OHA	LS	Knollen Tower OT, Knollenbaude inn; S: Bremke	Summit of the Großer Knollen with Knollen Tower and inn
Hinterer Ebersberg	686	Upper Harz; Harz NRP (LS)	Braunlage, Hohegeiß	UA-GS; GS	LS	Nullpunkt Monument; S: Ebersbach, S (near): Sprakelbach; S: Steinbach	
Kleiner Oderberg	685.1	Upper Harz; Harz NLP, Harz NRP (LS)	Sankt Andreasberg	GS	LS	near: Bergwiesen bei St. Andreasberg NR; S (near): Breitenbeek	
Aschentalshalbe	685	South Harz; Harz NRP (LS)	Sieber	UA-OHA; OHA	LS	S: Grade Lutter, S: Tiefenbeek	
Vorderer Ebersberg	684	Upper Harz; Harz NRP (LS)	Braunlage, Hohegeiß	UA-GS; GS	LS	Bechlerstein Monument; S: Ebersbach, S: Kleiner Wolfsbach	
Wolfsberg (Ilsenburg)	675	Upper Harz; Harz NLP, Harz/S-A NRP	Ilsenburg	HZ	S-A	Ferdinandsstein	
Koboltstaler Köpfe	673	South Harz; Harz NRP (LS)	Sankt Andreasberg, Sieber	UA-OHA; OHA	LS	S: Krumme Lutter	
Großer Schleifsteinsberg, (Großer Schleifsteinberg)	670.7	Upper Harz; Harz NRP (LS)	Goslar, Schulenberg	GS	LS	Großfürstin Alexandra Pit; S (near): Abzucht (Wintertalbach)	
Sägemühlenberg	670	Upper Harz; Harz NLP, Harz NRP (LS)	Sankt Andreasberg	UA-GS; GS	LS		
Ifenkopf	668.9	Upper Harz; Harz NRP (LS)	Altenau, Kamschlacken	UA-OHA; GS, OHA	LS	Ifenkopferklippe, Siebenwochenklippe	
Dicker Kopf	668	Upper Harz; Harz NRP (LS)	Goslar	UA-GS; GS	LS	Oker-Grane-Stollen, S: Steile Bramke, S: Gelmke	Rammelsberg Visitor Mine
Wolfskopf	668.5	Upper Harz; Harz NRP (LS)	Kamschlacken	UA-OHA; OHA	LS	Wolfsklippen	
Mittelberg (Torfhaus)	667.1	Upper Harz; Harz NRP (LS)	Altenau, Torfhaus	UA-GS; GS	LS	near: Upper Harz NR	
Großer Birkenkopf	664.1	Upper Harz; Harz/S-A NRP	Wernigerode, Hasserode	HZ	S-A	near: Kleine Renne, near: Steinerne Renne	
Matthias-Schmidt-Berg	663	Upper Harz; Harz NRP (LS)	Sankt Andreasberg	GS	LS	winter sports area, near: Bergwiesen bei St. Andreasberg NR; S (near): Breitenbeek	
Ravensberg	659	South Harz; Harz NRP (LS)	Bad Lauterberg, Bad Sachsa, Wieda	UA-OHA; OHA	LS	Berghof Ravensberg, communication tower (Ex-BNM surveillance tower), Wilhelmshöh, winter sports area	Southeast side of the Ravensberg summit
Beerberg	658.1	Upper Harz; Harz NRP (LS)	Sankt Andreasberg	GS	LS	Bergwiesen bei St. Andreasberg NR	
Hübichentalsköpfe	654.0	South Harz; Harz NRP (LS)	Bad Lauterberg, Sieber	UA-OHA; OHA	LS	S: Bremke	
Übelsberg	651.3	South Harz; Harz NRP (LS)	Bad Lauterberg, Sieber	UA-OHA; OHA	LS	S: Übelsbach; S (near): Schadenbeek	
Großer Oderberg	649.6	Upper Harz; Harz NLP	Sankt Andreasberg	UA-GS; GS	LS	S (near): Breitenbeek	
Kl. Steffentalskopf	648	Upper Harz; Harz NRP (LS)	Goslar, Schulenberg	GS	LS	S: Große Romke	
Brautstein	647.7	Upper Harz; Harz NRP (LS)	Goslar, Oker	UA-OHA; GS	LS		
Braakberg	645.5	South Harz; Harz NLP	Lonau	UA-OHA; OHA	LS	S (near): Kl. Lonau, S (near): Gr. Steinau	
Großer Wiesenberg	645.4	Upper Harz; Harz NRP (LS)	Schulenberg	GS	LS	winter sports area	
Oberer Meineckenberg	644.3	Upper Harz; Harz NLP, Harz/S-A NRP	Ilsenburg	HZ	S-A	near: Ilsefälle	
Breitenberg	643.8	Upper Harz; Harz NLP	Sankt Andreasberg	UA-GS; GS	LS		
Großer Ehrenberg	635.5	South Harz; South Harz NRP	Rothesütte	NMH	TH	S: Kunzenbach	
Rammelsberg	635.1	Upper Harz; Harz NRP (LS)	Goslar	GS	LS	Rammelsberg show mine, Maltermeister Tower, Blockschutthalden am Rammelsberg NR; Herzberger Teich, S (near): Dörpke	Rammelsberg show mine
Königsberg (Sieber)	634.5	Upper Harz; Harz NRP (LS)	Sieber	UA-OHA; OHA	LS	near: Siebertal NR	
Vogelheerd	634.4	South Harz; South Harz NRP	Rothesütte	NMH	TH	S: Dammbach, S: Kleiner Reddenbeek	
Wagnerskopf	633	South Harz; Harz NRP (LS)	Wieda, Zorge	UA-OHA; OHA	LS		
Kleiner Knollen	631	South Harz; Harz NRP (LS)	Bad Lauterberg, Sieber	UA-OHA; OHA	LS		
Großer Bockstalskopf	630	South Harz; Harz NRP (LS)	Bad Lauterberg, Bad Sachsa, Wieda	UA-OHA; OHA	LS	S: Klettenberger Mühlgraben	
Schindelkopf	629	Upper Harz; Harz NRP (LS)	Osterode am Harz	UA-OHA; OHA	LS	S: Eipenke, S: Kleine Steinau	
Glockenberg (Sankt Andreasberg)	627	Upper Harz; Harz NRP (LS)	Sankt Andreasberg	GS	LS	near: Bergwiesen bei St. Andreasberg NR; transmission tower	
Carlshaushöhe	626.3	Lower Harz; Harz/S-A NRP	Benneckenstein, Hasselfelde, Trautenstein	HZ	S-A		Carlshausturm on the Carlshaushöhe
Großer Wurzelnberg	625.8	Upper Harz; Harz NRP (LS)	Sieber	UA-OHA; OHA	LS	near: Siebertal NR; S (near): Kleine Kulmke	
Schloßkopf (Braunlage)	623.5	Upper Harz; Harz NLP	Braunlage, St. Andreasberg, Oderhaus	UA-GS; GS	LS	S: Trutenbeek	
Große Wulpke	622	Upper Harz, Harz NRP (LS)	Lautenthal, Münchehof	UA-GS; GS	LS	Stundenbuche; S (near): Schildau	
Heidelbeerköpfe	621	Upper Harz, Harz NRP (LS)	Buntenbock, Lerbach	UA-OHA; GS, OHA	LS	S Brautbrunnen, S (near): Kleine Limpig	
Großer Steierberg	619.5	South Harz; South Harz NRP	Rothesütte	NMH	TH		
Adlersberg (Wildemann)	615	Upper Harz; Harz NRP (LS)	Wildemann	UA-GS; GS	LS		
Rauhe Höhe	614.2	Lower Harz; Harz/S-A NRP	Benneckenstein, Rothesütte, Zorge	HZ	S-A	S: Rappbode	
Hasselkopf (Braunlage)	612	Upper Harz; Harz NRP (LS)	Braunlage	GS	LS	Hasselkopf Tunnel (B 4), Ski lift, piste, cross country skiing trail	
Bärentalsköpfe	611.2	South Harz; Harz NRP (LS)	Bad Lauterberg, Sieber	UA-OHA; OHA	LS		
Kleiner Ehrenberg	610.1	South Harz; South Harz NRP	Rothesütte	NMH	TH	S: Ehrenbergsborn, S: Ellerbach, S: Fuhrbach	
Kleiner Wurzelnberg	610	Upper Harz; Harz NRP (LS)	Sieber	UA-OHA; OHA	LS	near: Siebertal NR; S (near): Kleine Kulmke, S (near): Verl. Kulmke	
Hoher Berg	609.3	Upper Harz; Harz NRP (LS)	Wildemann	UA-GS; GS	LS	Einersberger Teiche, S: Juliaquelle	
Großer Trogtaler Berg	608.6	Upper Harz; Harz NRP (LS)	Lautenthal, Seesen	UA-GS; GS	LS	Lynx Stone (monument) ]; Dam of the Innerste Reservoir, S: Tränkebach	
Schwarzenberg	606.3	Upper Harz; Harz NRP (LS)	Altenau	UA-GS; GS	LS	OP Brockenblick	
Langfast	606.1	South Harz; Harz NLP, Harz NRP (LS)	Herzberg, Sieber	UA-OHA; OHA	LS	near: Siebertal NR	
Kaltetalskopf	605	Upper Harz; Harz NLP	Bad Harzburg	GS	LS	near: Hausmannsklippen, Rabenklippe, Lynx enclosure, Rabenklippe inn; Grimmeckenteich, Reuscheteich, S: Förstertränke, S: Kältetalsbach, S: Stübchenbach	
Schadenbeeksköpfe	605.0	South Harz; Harz NRP (LS)	Sieber, Bad Lauterberg	UA-OHA; OHA	LS	Pits: Johanne-Elise und near: Wolkenhügel, S: Schadenbeek	
Huthberg	604.8	Upper Harz; Harz NRP (LS)	Oker, Schulenberg	UA-GS; GS	LS	Feigenbaumklippe/-kanzel, Kästeklippen; Treppenstein-Klippe; S: Jägerborn, S: Kleine Romke	Auf den Kästeklippen near the summit of the Huthberg
Heimberg (Lautenthal)	604.5	Upper Harz, Harz NRP (LS)	Hahnenklee, Lautenthal, Wolfshagen	UA-GS; GS	LS	near: Altarklippen; Dam of the Grane Reservoir, S: Bauernholzbach, S: Borbergsbach	
Buchenköpfe	603.1	Lower Harz; Harz/S-A NRP	Benneckenstein, Rothesütte	HZ, NMH	S-A, TH	Stierbergsteich, S: Dammbach	
Jagdkopf (Zorge)	603.1	South Harz; Harz NRP (LS)	Wieda, Zorge	UA-OHA; OHA	LS	Bremer Klippe; S: Breitenbach	
Stierberg	602.4	South Harz; South Harz NRP	Rothesütte, Sophienhof	NMH	TH	Stierbergsteich, S (near): Dammbach, S: Tiefenbach	
Jagdkopf (Wieda)	602.1	South Harz; Harz NRP (LS)	Wieda	UA-OHA; OHA	LS		
Poppenberg	600.6	South Harz; South Harz NRP	Ilfeld, Birkenmoor	NMH	TH	Poppenberg Tower (OT)	The tower on the Poppenberg
Birkenkopf (Ilfeld)	599.8	South Harz; South Harz NRP	Ilfeld, Birkenmoor, Breitenstein	NMH, NMH, MSH	TH, TH, S-A	S Harz Karst Landscape BR; S: Bere; S: Krebsbach (Tiefetalswasser), near: Neustadt Dam	
Wolfsberg (Hohegeiß) (Hinterer, Oberer, Vorderer Wolfsberg)	599.6	Upper Harz; Harz NRP (LS)	Hohegeiß	UA-GS; GS	LS	Wolfsbachmühle	
Große Harzhöhe	599.3	Lower Harz; Harz/S-A NRP	Stiege, Breitenstein, Birkenmoor	HZ, MSH, NMH	S-A, ST, TH	S: Bere, S: Katzsohlbach	
Steintaler Berg	598.5	Upper Harz, Harz NRP (LS)	Clausthal, Bad Grund	UA-OHA; OHA, GS	LS	Hahnebalzer Teiche, S: Große Bremke, S: Großer Uferbach	
Gr. Steffentalskopf	590	Upper Harz; Harz NRP (LS)	Goslar, Schulenberg	GS	LS		
Hasselkopf (Bad Harzburg)	590	Upper Harz; Harz NRP (LS)	Bad Harzburg	GS	LS	Muxklippe, Pferdediebsklippe; near: Dam of the Ecker Reservoir	
Schalliete	595.1	Lower Harz; Harz/S-A NRP	Stiege, Breitenstein, Friedrichshöhe, Birkenmoor	HZ, MSH, MSH, NMH	S-A, ST, ST, TH	S: Steigerbach, S (near): Katzsohlbach	
Gropenbornskopf	595	South Harz; Harz NRP (LS)	Sieber	UA-OHA; OHA	LS	near: Siebertal NR; S: Gropenborn	
Galgenberg	594.3	Upper Harz; Harz NRP (LS)	Sankt Andreasberg	GS	LS	near: Bergwiesen bei St. Andreasberg NR	
Adlersberg (Sieber)	593.2	South Harz; Harz NRP (LS)	Sieber	UA-OHA; OHA	LS		
Ziegenberg (Buntenbock)	592.0	Upper Harz, Harz NRP (LS)	Buntenbock	GS	LS	& a.: Ziegenberger Teich, S: Lerbach	
Einersberg	591.7	Upper Harz; Harz NRP (LS)	Bad Grund, Clausthal-Zellerfeld, Wildemann	UA-GS; GS	LS	Einersberger Teiche	
Kleiner Birkenkopf	590.8	Upper Harz; Harz/S-A NRP	Wernigerode, Hasserode	HZ	S-A	near: Kleine Renne, near: Steinerne Renne	
Großertalsköpfe	587.5	South Harz; Harz NRP (LS)	Bad Lauterberg, Sieber	UA-OHA; OHA	LS	S: Gr. Andreasbach	
Zwißelkopf	587.3	Upper Harz; Harz NLP, Harz/S-A NRP	Ilsenburg	HZ	S-A	S: Kienbach, S: Suenbeek	
Ramberg (Harz region, ridge) (see individual hills)	587.1	Ramberg; Harz/S-A NRP	Friedrichsbrunn, Gernrode, Thale	HZ	S-A	Ramberg high points: – Old Castle – Birkenkopf – Burgberg – Gr. Dambachskopf – Kl. Dambachskopf – Mailaubenkopf – Steinköpfe – Viktorshöhe – Wegenerskopf	
Wegenerskopf	587.1	Ramberg; Harz/S-A NRP	Friedrichsbrunn	HZ	S-A	Ruins of Erichsberg Castle, transmission tower, Spaltenmoor NR; S: Friedenstalbach, S: Kleiner Uhlenbach, S: Wurmbach	
Winterberg (Bad Harzburg)	585.3	Upper Harz; Harz NLP	Bad Harzburg	GS	LS	Rudolfklippe; near: Hasselteich, near: Radau; Waterfall; S: Großer Hasselbach	
Spitzer Klinz (Spitzer Glinz)	585.1	South Harz; South Harz NRP	Rothesütte, Sülzhayn	NMH	TH	S (near): Fuhrbach	
Blockkötenkopf	585	Upper Harz, Harz NRP (LS)	Buntenbock, Lerbach	UA-OHA; GS, OHA	LS, |LS	Antonsblick; near: Dam of the Söse Reservoir	
Höxterberg	584.0	South Harz; Harz NRP (LS)	Sieber	UA-OHA; OHA	LS	Lübbersbuche; S: Eichelnbach, S: Eichelngraben	
Hirtenberg	582	South Harz; Harz NLP	Lonau	UA-OHA; OHA	LS		The Hirtenberg (right) and the Großer Mittelberg (left) in a panorama at Lonau
Nesselkopf	581.6	South Harz; Harz NRP (LS)	Bad Lauterberg, Bad Sachsa, Wieda	UA-OHA; OHA	LS		
Viktorshöhe	581.5	Ramberg; Harz/S-A NRP	Friedrichsbrunn, Gernrode, Mägdesprung	HZ	S-A	Viktorshöhe OT, transmission tower, Bear Monument, Gr. / Kl. Teufelsmühle (rock formation/crags), Draht-/Seilwerke Rothenburg holiday home ruins; Bergrat-Müller-Teich, Bremer Teich, Erichsburger Teich, S: Krebsbach	Viktorshöhe observation tower (no longer accessible)
Großer Auerberg (north summit)	580.4	Lower Harz; Harz/S-A NRP	Stolberg, Straßberg	MSH, HZ	S-A	S Harz Karst Landscape BR, until 1880 site of an OT, near: Josephshöhe	
Josephshöhe (south summit of the Gr. Auerberg)	580.3	Lower Harz; Harz/S-A NRP	Stolberg, Straßberg	MSH, HZ	S-A	S Harz Karst Landscape BR, Joseph‘s Cross OT, near: Großer Auerberg	Joseph’s Cross on the Josephshöhe
Kargeskopf	580.1	South Harz; Harz NLP	Lonau	UA-OHA; OHA	LS		
Langenberg (Sülzhayn)	580	South Harz; Harz NRP (LS), South Harz NRP	Sülzhayn, Zorge	NMH, UA-OHA; OHA	TH, LS	S: Sülze, S: Elsbach	
Breitentalskopf	579.1	South Harz; Harz NRP (LS)	Sieber	UA-OHA; OHA	LS	near: Siebertal NR; S (near): Tiefenbeek	
Dornkopf	579.0	South Harz; South Harz NRP	Rothesütte	NMH	TH		
Krödberg	577.8	South Harz; South Harz NRP	Sülzhayn, Zorge	UA-OHA; NMH, OHA	TH, LS	S: Kl. Kunzentalbach	
Schieferberg (Buntenbock)	577.5	Upper Harz, Harz NRP (LS)	Buntenbock, Lerbach	UA-OHA; GS, OHA	LS	near: Kuckholzklippe OT an gleichnamiger Klippe, S (near): Lerbach	
Heiligenstock (Sülzhayn)	575.8	South Harz; South Harz NRP, Harz NRP (LS)	Sülzhayn, Zorge	NMH, UA-OHA; OHA	TH; LS	S: Sülze, S: Elsbach	
Scholben	575.1	South Harz; Harz NRP (LS)	Bad Lauterberg	UA-OHA; OHA	LS	near: Wiesenbeker Teich; S: Gretaquelle	
Meineberg (Darlingerode)	574.4	Upper Harz; Harz NLP, Harz/S-A NRP	Darlingerode	HZ	S-A	S: Saneltalsbach (Sandtalsbach)	
Mailaubenkopf	573.4	Ramberg; Harz/S-A NRP	Friedrichsbrunn	HZ	S-A	S: Steinbach, S: Wurmbach	
Hohestein (Hohenstein); (Seesen)	572	Upper Harz; Harz NRP (LS)	Seesen	UA-GS; GS	LS	Dam of the Innerste Reservoir, S: Grane, S: Kaltebach, S: Neile, S: Wroxenbach	
Hasenberg	572.0	Upper Harz; Harz NRP (LS)	Wildemann	UA-GS; GS	LS	Tillyschanze; S: Pandelbach	
Halberstädter Berg	571.5	Upper Harz; Harz/S-A NRP	Darlingerode, Drübeck	HZ	S-A	Harschenhöllenklippe	Halberstädter Berg with Darlingerode in the foreground
Zwergsberg	570.7	South Harz; South Harz NRP	Netzkater, Rothesütte	NMH	TH		
Bettler	568.8	South Harz; South Harz NRP, Harz/S-A NRP	Neustadt, Breitenstein	NMH, MSH	TH, S-A	near: S Harz Karst Landscape BR; Neustadt Dam	
Rauher Jakob (Rauher Jacob)	568.6	Lower Harz; Harz/S-A NRP	Elend, Tanne	HZ	S-A	S (near): Kl. Allerbach	
Großer Romke	568.2	Upper Harz; Harz NRP (LS)	Goslar, Schulenberg	GS	LS	near: HS Romkerhalle	
Giersberg	567.4	South Harz; South Harz NRP	Netzkater, Rothesütte	NMH	TH		
Unterer Meineckenberg	565.9	Upper Harz; Harz NLP, Harz/S-A NRP	Ilsenburg	HZ	S-A	near: Ilsefälle	
Sangenberg	565.9	Upper Harz, Harz NRP (LS)	Hahausen, Langelsheim	UA-GS; GS	LS	Dam of the Innerste Reservoir, S: Gr. Steimker Bach, S: Kl. Steimker Bach	
Woldsberg	565	Upper Harz; Harz NLP; Harz NLP	Bad Harzburg	GS	LS	Ruins of Hasselburg, Woldsbergklippen; S: Blaubach	
Iberg (Bad Grund)	562.6	Upper Harz; Harz NRP (LS)	Bad Grund, Wildemann	OHA, GS	LS	, Iberg Dripstone Cave; S: Alter Pandelbach	Albert Tower
Franzosenkopf	562.0	South Harz; Harz NLP	Lonau	UA-OHA; OHA	LS		
Dietrichsberg	560	Upper Harz; Harz NRP (LS)	Altenau, Schulenberg	UA-GS; GS	LS	Oker Reservoir; Ravensklippen	
Gillenkopf	558.2	South Harz; South Harz NRP	Birkenmoor, Breitenstein	NMH, MSH	TH, S-A	S: Bere; near: Neustadt Dam	
Ecksberg	556.9	Upper Harz; Harz NRP (LS)	Lautenthal	UA-GS; GS	LS		
Kontorkopf (Höhenzug Hippeln)	556.1	Upper Harz; Harz NLP, Harz/S-A NRP	Wernigerode, Hasserode	HZ	S-A	near: Steinerne Renne	
Wellbornskopf	555.1	Upper Harz, Harz/S-A NRP	Drei Annen Hohne, Hasserode, Nöschenrode	HZ	S-A	Dam of the Zillierbach Reservoir	
Großer Staufenberg	554	South Harz; Harz NRP (LS)	Zorge	UA-OHA; OHA	LS	Staufenberg NR; S: Limbach	
Kloppstert (Klappstept), (Sieber)	553	South Harz; Harz NRP (LS)	Sieber	UA-OHA; OHA	LS	near: Siebertal NR	
Solberg	552.9	South Harz; South Harz NRP	Netzkater, Rothesütte	NMH	TH		
Honigberg	551.8	South Harz; South Harz NRP	Netzkater, Rothesütte	NMH	TH	S: Fuhrbach	
Ortberg	550.1	Lower Harz; Harz/S-A NRP	Elbingerode	HZ	S-A	Kunstbergschacht, transmission tower; Dam of the Zillierbach Reservoir	
Kleiner Steierberg	548.9	South Harz; South Harz NRP	Rothesütte	NMH	TH	Pfaffenborn	
Stehlenberg	548.7	South Harz; South Harz NRP	Rothesütte, Sülzhayn	NMH	TH	S: Ellerbach, S: Goldbrunnen	
Rabenkopf	547.4	South Harz; South Harz NRP	Ilfeld, Netzkater	NMH	TH	Brandesbachtal NR (north flank)	
Leckenkopf	546.9	Lower Harz; Harz/S-A NRP	Stiege, Birkenmoor	HZ, NMH	S-A, TH		
Saxonyberg	546	Upper Harz; Harz NRP (LS)	Bad Harzburg	GS	LS	Reste einer Wallanlage, Saxonystein, near:Sennhütte inn	
Eichelnkopf	545.7	South Harz; Harz NRP (LS)	Scharzfeld, Sieber	UA-OHA; OHA	LS	Euleneiche, S (near): Eichelnbach, S (near): Eichelngraben	Eichelnkopf (von Südwesten), right in the background der Große Knollen with Observation Tower
Pagelsburg	545	South Harz; Harz NRP (LS)	Sieber	UA-OHA; OHA	LS		
Meineberg (Ilsenburg)	544.5	Upper Harz; Harz NLP, Harz/S-A NRP	Ilsenburg	HZ	S-A	Bäumlersklippe, Froschfelsen	
Butterberg (Ilfeld)	539.5	South Harz; South Harz NRP	Bahnhof Eisfelder Talmühle, Birkenmoor	NMH	TH		
Hagenberg	538.6	South Harz; South Harz NRP	Bahnhof Eisfelder Talmühle, Birkenmoor, Christianenhaus, Netzkater	NMH	TH		
Großer Hornberg	537.6	Lower Harz, Harz/S-A NRP	Kalkwerk Hornberg halt (Rübeland Railway), Königshütte	HZ	S-A		
Hohenstein (Sülzhayn)	536.3	South Harz; South Harz NRP	Sülzhayn	NMH	TH	S: Ellerbach	
Kummelberg (Kummel)	536.0	Upper Harz; Harz NRP (LS)	Bad Lauterberg	UA-OHA; OHA	LS	Bismarck Tower, Bad Lauterberg (OT), Kummelbaude inn	Bad Lauterberg's Bismarck Tower and inn on the Kummelberg (Kummel)
Kapitelsberg	535.7	Lower Harz; Harz/S-A NRP	Tanne	HZ	S-A	near:Harzer Bachtäler NR	
Eulenkopf	534.5	South Harz; South Harz NRP	Netzkater, Rothesütte	NMH	TH		
Kleiner Brocken (Breitenstein)	533.1	Lower Harz; Harz/S-A NRP	Breitenstein	MSH	S-A	S Harz Karst Landscape BR; S: Lude	
Mittelberg (Herrmannsacker)	533.0	South Harz; South Harz NRP, Harz/S-A NRP	Herrmannsacker, Neustadt, Hainfeld	NMH, NMH, MSH	TH, TH, S-A	near: S Harz Karst Landscape BR; Neustadt Dam	
Großer Mittelberg (Lonau)	531.0	South Harz; Harz NLP	Lonau	UA-OHA; OHA	LS		The Großer Mittelberg (left) with the Hirtenberg (right) in a panorama at Lonau
Großer Hengstrücken	530.8	South Harz; South Harz NRP	Netzkater, Rothesütte	NMH	TH		
Heidelberg (Neustadt)	527.5	South Harz; South Harz NRP	Neustadt, Birkenmoor	NMH, NMH	TH, TH	Neustadt Dam	
Fissenkenkopf	527.0	South Harz; Harz NRP (LS)	Sieber	UA-OHA; OHA	LS	near: Siebertal NR	
Oberer Großer Balkenberg (…Bakenberg)	526.4	Upper Harz, Harz NRP (LS)	Hahausen	UA-GS; GS	LS	S: Gr. Steimker Bach, S: Hummecke	
Stahlberg	525.2	Lower Harz; Harz/S-A NRP	Rübeland	HZ	S-A	Ex: Grube Stahlberg	
Bielstein (Wernigerode)	525	Upper Harz; Harz/S-A NRP	Wernigerode, Hasserode	HZ	S-A	near: Steinerne Renne	
Steinberg (Hasserode)	525	Upper Harz; Harz/S-A NRP	Hasserode, Wernigerode	HZ	S-A	near: Elversstein	
Heiligenberg	524.7	South Harz; South Harz NRP	Sülzhayn	NMH	TH		
Burgbeil	524.2	Lower Harz; Harz/S-A NRP	Breitenstein, Hainfeld	MSH	S-A	S Harz Karst Landscape BR; S: Lude; S (near): Katzsohlbach	
Hahnenberg	520.3	Upper Harz; Harz NRP (LS)	Goslar, Oker	UA-OHA; GS	LS	Hauenschildklippe	
Eichenberg (Hasselfelde)	520	Lower Harz; Harz/S-A NRP	Hasselfelde	HZ	S-A	Eichenberg NR, near: Präzeptorklippe; Dam of the Rappbode Reservoir	
Steile Wand (q. v.: Steile Wand on the Bruchberg)	518.9	South Harz; Harz NRP (LS)	Herzberg, Sieber	UA-OHA; OHA	LS	near: Siebertal NR	
Scheffeltalsköpfe	518.0	South Harz; Harz NRP (LS)	Bad Lauterberg	UA-OHA; OHA	LS	S (near): Heibeek	
Großer Stemberg	517.1	Lower Harz; Harz/S-A NRP	Altenbrak, Hasselfelde	HZ	S-A	Dam of the Rappbode Reservoir, Oberbecken of the PSW Wendefurth	
Sandlünz	516.2	South Harz; South Harz NRP	Ilfeld, Netzkater	NMH	TH	Brandesbachtal NR(north and northwest flanks), Dreitälerblick OP, Rabensteiner Stollen(visitor mine)	
Hartenberg (Büchenberg)	516.0	Lower Harz; Harz/S-A NRP	Elbingerode, Hartenberg	HZ	S-A	Hartenberg-Freizeitwohngebiet; Büchenberg-Siedlung, Büchenberg Pit (show mine); S: Teufelsbach	
Langer Berg	515.9	South Harz; South Harz NRP	Sülzhayn	NMH	TH		
Bastkopf	513.0	Lower Harz, Harz/S-A NRP	Königshütte, Neue Hütte	HZ	S-A	near: Dam of the Mandelholz Reservoir	
Kleiner Schumannsberg	512.0	South Harz; South Harz NRP	Haltepunkt Tiefenbachmühle, Sophienhof	NMH	TH		
Kaulberg	511.7	South Harz; South Harz NRP	Ilfeld	NMH	TH		
Sattelkopf (q. v. Sattelköpfe)	510.4	South Harz; South Harz NRP	Netzkater, Rothesütte	NMH	TH		
Rabensteine (q. v.: Rabenstein near Königshütte)	510	Lower Harz; Harz/S-A NRP	Hasselfelde	HZ	S-A	near: Rabenklippen (Gr. and Kl. Rabenklippe); Dam of the Hassel Forebay, TSP Rappbode Forebay, TSP Rappbode Reservoir	
Steinköpfe (Friedrichsbrunn) southern Steinkopf: northern Steinkopf:	507.6 507.6; 488.0	Ramberg; Harz/S-A NRP	Friedrichsbrunn, Thale	HZ	S-A		
Hoppelberg (Hasselfelde)	507.5	Lower Harz-N; Harz/S-A NRP	Hasselfelde	HZ	S-A	Pullman City Harz; Dam of the Hasselvorsperre, TSP Rappbode Reservoir	
Hilmersberg	507.0	Upper Harz; Harz/S-A NRP	Wernigerode, Elbingerode	HZ	S-A		
Kesselberg	507.0	South Harz; South Harz NRP	Sülzhayn	NMH	TH		
Osterkopf	505.9	Lower Harz; Harz/S-A NRP	Breitenstein, Harzine	MSH	S-A		
Rotestein (Roter Stein)	505	Lower Harz; Harz/S-A NRP	Hasselfelde	HZ	S-A	Dam of the Rappbode Reservoir	
Netzberg	504.8	South Harz; South Harz NRP	Ilfeld, Netzkater	NMH	TH	Dühringsklippe (Südostkuppe)	View from the „Gänseschnabel“ nordwestwärts über das Beretal to the Steinberg (mittig) and Netzberg (right)
Roter Schuss	504.6	South Harz; South Harz NRP	Sülzhayn	NMH	TH		
Käseberg	504	South Harz; Harz NRP (LS)	Wieda	OHA	LS		
Knicking	501.1	South Harz; Harz NRP (LS)	Wieda	OHA	LS		
Ettersberg	500.1	Upper Harz; Harz NLP	Bad Harzburg	GS	LS	Ettersklippe, Forsthaus Radauberg, near: Sennhütte inn	
Mittelecke	500.1	South Harz; Harz NRP (LS)	Sieber, Bad Lauterberg	UA-OHA; OHA	LS	Lübbersbuche, S: Eichelnbach, S: Eichelngraben	
Rabenstein (q. v.: Rabensteine near Hasselfelde)	499.1	Lower Harz, Harz/S-A NRP	Königshütte	HZ	S-A	Königshütte Waterfall	
Peterstein	498.0	Lower Harz; Harz/S-A NRP	Elbingerode, Nöschenrode	HZ	S-A	Dam of the Zillierbach Reservoir	
Großer Schumannsberg	497.2	South Harz; South Harz NRP	Bahnhof Eisfelder Talmühle, Sophienhof	NMH	TH		
Bockberg	496.0	Lower Harz, Harz/S-A NRP	Königshütte, Neue Hütte	HZ	S-A	Bockberg NR; near: Königshütte Dam	
Kleiner Ronneberg (q. v. Kleiner Rönneberg)	495.9	Lower Harz; Harz/S-A NRP	Hainfeld	MSH	S-A	S Harz Karst Landscape BR, near: Großer Ronneberg-Bielstein NR	
Eichenberg (Zorge)	495.1	South Harz; Harz NRP (LS)	Wieda, Zorge	UA-OHA; OHA	LS		
Birkenkopf (Thale)	495	Ramberg; Harz/S-A NRP	Thale, Friedrichsbrunn	HZ	S-A	near: Bode Gorge NR, near: Wilhelm Pfeil Monument, not far from: Hexentanzplatz	
Kohlenberg	495	Lower Harz; Harz/S-A NRP	Wendefurth	HZ	S-A	Dam of the Rappbode Reservoir, Wendefurth Reservoir TSP, Upper basin of Wendefurth PSW	
Sankt Andreasberg (Goslar)	494.0	Upper Harz; Harz NRP (LS)	Goslar	GS	LS	Margaretenklippen	
Totenkopf	492.6	South Harz; South Harz NRP	Appenrode, Rothesütte	NMH	TH		
Großer Teichtalskopf	492	South Harz; Harz NLP, Harz NRP (LS)	Herzberg, Lonau	UA-OHA; OHA	LS	near: Siebertal NR	Großer Teichtalskopf, von der Steilen Wand betrachtet
Ampenberg	488.8	Lower Harz; Harz/S-A NRP	Straßberg, Breitenstein	HZ	S-A		
Nickelsberg	488.2	Lower Harz; Harz/S-A NRP	Hasselfelde, Neuwerk	HZ	S-A	Tunnel der L 96; Dam of the Rappbode Reservoir, TSP Wendefurth Reservoir	
Eichenberg (Bad Harzburg)	485.8	Upper Harz; Harz NLP; Harz NRP (LS)	Bad Harzburg	GS	LS		
Großer Burgberg	485	Upper Harz; Harz NRP (LS)	Bad Harzburg	GS	LS	Harzburg ruins, Canossa column, Burgberg Cable Car	The Großer Burgberg and the lower terminus of the Burgberg Cable Car
Voßtaler Berg (Vosstaler Berg)	484.5	Upper Harz, Harz NRP (LS)	Hahausen, Langelsheim	UA-GS; GS	LS	S: Kl. Steimker Bach	
Kühnenkopf	480.8	Upper Harz; Harz/S-A NRP	Wernigerode	HZ	S-A		
Höhe	479.2	Lower Harz; Harz/S-A NRP	Dietersdorf	MSH	S-A	S Harz Karst Landscape BR	
Bielstein (Hainfeld); Großer Bielstein: Kleiner Bielstein:	478.7 478.7; 470.5	Lower Harz; Harz/S-A NRP	Hainfeld, Rodishain	MSH, NMH	S-A, TH	S Harz Karst Landscape BR, Großer Ronneberg-Bielstein NR	
Steinbergkopf	478.5	Upper Harz; Harz/S-A NRP	Hasserode, Wernigerode	HZ	S-A	near: Elversstein	
Armeleuteberg	477.8	Upper Harz; Harz/S-A NRP	Wernigerode	HZ	S-A	Kaiserturm OT, Armeleuteberg inn	The Emperor Tower on the Armeleuteberg
Kulmer Berg	476.7	Lower Harz; Harz/S-A NRP	Schwenda	MSH	S-A	S Harz Karst Landscape BR	
Pferdekopf (Stolberg)	476.3	Lower Harz; Harz/S-A NRP	Stolberg	MSH	S-A	S Harz Karst Landscape BR, Pferdekopf NR	
Schimmelshütchen	475.9	South Harz; South Harz NRP	Sülzhayn	NMH	TH		
Katzenberg	475.8	Lower Harz; Harz/S-A NRP	Königshütte	HZ	S-A	near: Ruins of Königsburg	
Elfenstein	475	Upper Harz; Harz NRP (LS)	Bad Harzburg	UA-GS; GS	LS	Elfenstein (Felsformation/-klippen)	
Ilsestein (Ilsenstein)	473.2	Upper Harz; Harz NLP, Harz/S-A NRP	Ilsenburg	HZ	S-A	Site of a former siege castle (Trutzburg)	Ilsestein (taken around 1880-1890
Unterer Großer Balkenberg (…Bakenberg)	472.2	Upper Harz, Harz NRP (LS)	Hahausen	UA-GS; GS	LS	S: Hummecke	
Heuer	472	South Harz; Harz NLP	Lonau	UA-OHA; OHA	LS	S Faulborn	
Steinberg (Goslar)	472	Upper Harz; Harz NRP (LS)	Steinberg	GS	LS	Steinberg Tower (OT) near:Dam of the Grane Reservoir	Steinberg observation tower on the Steinberg near Goslar
Kuhberg (Hüttenrode)	469.2	Lower Harz; Harz/S-A NRP	Hüttenrode, Wendefurth	HZ	S-A	near: Dam of the Wendefurth Reservoir	
Thumkuhlenköpfe (Thumkuhlenkopf)	468.5	Upper Harz; Harz/S-A NRP	Hasserode	HZ	S-A	Thumkuhlenkopf Tunnel (Harzquerbahn)	
Fenstermacherberg	466.5	Lower Harz; Harz/S-A NRP	Wernigerode	HZ	S-A		
Kleiner Dambachskopf	465.5	Ramberg; Harz/S-A NRP	Thale, Treseburg	HZ	S-A	near: S: Dambach	
Großer Heibeekskopf	465.2	South Harz; Harz NRP (LS)	Bad Lauterberg	UA-OHA; OHA	LS	S: Augenquelle, S: Heibeek	
Großer Ronneberg (q. v. Großer Rönneberg)	465.2	Lower Harz; Harz/S-A NRP	Hainfeld, Herrmannsacker, Rodishain	MSH, NMH, NMH	S-A, TH, TH	S Harz Karst Landscape BR, Großer Ronneberg-Bielstein NR	
Sülzberg	464.8	South Harz; South Harz NRP	Sülzhayn	NMH	TH		
Scharfenstein (Wernigerode)	462.4	Upper Harz; Harz/S-A NRP	Wernigerode	HZ	S-A	Scharfensteinklippe	
Hegersberg	461.6	South Harz; South Harz NRP	Appenrode	NMH	TH		
Gallenberg (eastern spur of the Hasenberg)	460.6	Upper Harz; Harz NRP (LS)	Wildemann	GS	LS	Wildemann Tunnel (Gallenberg Tunnel) (Innerstetalbahn)	
Ochsenkopf	460.3	South Harz; South Harz NRP	Netzkater	NMH	TH	S: Leimbach	
Langenberg (Neudorf)	458.8	Lower Harz; Harz/S-A NRP	Neudorf, Saxony-Anhalt	HZ	S-A	near: Kalbsaugenteich	
Heimberg (Güntersberge)	458.4	Lower Harz, Harz/S-A NRP	Güntersberge	HZ	S-A	Site of Heimberg castle	
Hexentanzplatz	457.7	Lower Harz; Harz/S-A NRP	Thale, Königsruhe	HZ	S-A	Bode Gorge NR, Bode Valley Cable Car, Berghotel, Thale Mountain Theatre, Valpurgis Hall Museum, Saxon Dyke (Sachsenwall) ruins, summer rodelbahn, wildlife park	View of Hexentanzplatz east of the Bode Gorge
Scharfenberg	457.6	South Harz; South Harz NRP	Sülzhayn	NMH	TH		
Hoher Kopf (NNE of Questenberg)	457.0	Lower Harz; Harz/S-A NRP	Breitenbach, Rotha, Questenberg	MSH	S-A	S Harz Karst Landscape BR, Questenberg Gypsum Karst Landscape NR; S: Dinsterbach, S: Nasse	
Schieferberg (Neuwerk)	456.2	Lower Harz; Harz/S-A NRP	Hüttenrode, Neuwerk, Wendefurth	HZ	S-A	Schieferberg NR; Dam of the Wendefurth Reservoir	
Hirschbuchenkopf	456.1	Lower Harz; Harz/S-A NRP	Güntersberge, Siptenfelde, Straßberg	HZ	S-A	Upper; Selke Valley NR	
Großer Dambachskopf	454.3	Ramberg; Harz/S-A NRP	Thale, Treseburg	HZ	S-A	near: Bode Gorge NR, near: Wilhelm Pfeil Monument, Dambachhaus Forester's House	
Königsberg (Goslar)	454	Upper Harz; Harz NRP (LS)	Goslar	GS	LS	Dam of the Grane Reservoir	Königsberg with Grane Reservoir
Kirchhofsberg	452.3	Lower Harz; Harz/S-A NRP	Wendefurth	HZ	S-A	Dam of the Wendefurth Reservoir, Oberbecken of the PSW Wendefurth	
Dankeröder Berg	449.2	Lower Harz; Harz/S-A NRP	Dankerode, Neudorf	HZ	S-A	S (near): Schmale Wipper	
Hübichenstein	448.5	Upper Harz; Harz NRP (LS)	Bad Grund	OHA	LS	Emperor William I Monument with bronze eagle at the top	???
Steinköpfe (Benneckenrode)	446.1	Lower Harz; Harz/S-A NRP	Benneckenrode, Thale, Treseburg	HZ	S-A	Steinköpfe NR, near: Bibrakreuz	
Wendefurther Berg	446.1	Lower Harz; Harz/S-A NRP	Wendefurth	HZ	S-A	near: Dam of the Wendefurth Reservoir	
Stapenberg	443.4	Upper Harz; Harz/S-A NRP	Benzingerode	HZ	S-A		
Kleiner Romke	441.7	Upper Harz; Harz NRP (LS)	Goslar, Schulenberg	GS	LS	Romkerhall Waterfall, near:Romkerhall inn, near: Romkerhalle HS	
Silberkopf	441.4	South Harz; South Harz NRP	Ilfeld	NMH	TH	S: Silberbach	
Kleiner Heibeekskopf	440.1	South Harz; Harz NRP (LS)	Bad Lauterberg	UA-OHA; OHA	LS	S: Augenquelle	
Roßtrappenberg	438.7	Lower Harz; Harz/S-A NRP	Thale, Königsruhe	HZ	S-A	near: Bibrakreuz, Bode Gorge NR, Roßtrappe (Klippe), Sessellift Thale, Winzenburg (Ex-Fliehburg), Winzenburgturm OT, Berghotel Rosstrappe	
Harburg	438.2	Upper Harz; Harz/S-A NRP	Wernigerode	HZ	S-A	Site of Harburg Castle, inn (currently closed), former Wernigerode Bismarck Monument	View from the Kühnenkopf to the hill of Harburg with Wernigerode Castle on the Burgberg in the background
Kleiner Burgberg	436.5	Upper Harz; Harz NRP (LS)	Bad Harzburg	GS	LS	Ruins of Kleine Harzburg	
Armsberg (Wendefurth)	435.2	Lower Harz; Harz/S-A NRP	Wendefurth	Hz	S-A	near: Dam of the Wendefurth Reservoir	
Staufenberg	433.8	Lower Harz; Harz/S-A NRP	Blankenburg	HZ	S-A	Michaelstein station(Rübeland Railway), near: Ex Bielstein Tunnel (Rübeland Railway)	
Eichberg (Straßberg)	430.6	Lower Harz; Harz/S-A NRP	Straßberg	HZ	S-A		
Sösekopf (Sösenkopf)	423.1	Upper Harz, Harz NRP (LS)	Osterode	OHA	LS	Dam of the Söse Reservoir	
Hausberg (q. v. Großer Hausberg)	420	Upper Harz; Harz NRP (LS)	Bad Lauterberg	OHA	LS	Lutterberg Castle ruins, Bad Lauterberg Cable Car, Hausberg inn	The Hausberg and Bad Lauterberg Cable Car
Kleiner Staufenberg	420	South Harz; Harz NRP (LS)	Zorge	UA-OHA; OHA	LS	Staufenberg NR, Jungfernklippe NM, Staufenburg CD	
Eichenberg (Blankenburg)	416.0	Lower Harz; Harz/S-A NRP	Blankenburg	HZ	S-A	Wilhelm Raabe Tower (OT)	The Wilhelm Raabe Tower on the Eichenberg
Staufenbüttel	408.1	South Harz; Harz NRP (LS)	Bad Sachsa, Steina	OHA	LS	transmission tower	
Ziegenkopf	406.1	Lower Harz; Harz/S-A NRP	Blankenburg, Hüttenrode	HZ	S-A	Ziegenkopfturm OT, Ziegenkopf inn	Ziegenkopfturm and Berggaststätte on the Ziegenkopf
Bielstein (Blankenburg)	405	Lower Harz; Harz/S-A NRP	Blankenburg	HZ	S-A	near: Ex Bielstein Tunnel (Rübelandbahn), near: Bielsteinklippe	
Schloßberg	402.9	South Harz; South Harz NRP	Neustadt	NMH	TH	Hohnstein Castle ruins	Hohnstein Castle on the Schloßberg
Forstköpfe	402.4	South Harz; South Harz NRP	Werna	NMH	TH		
Ramsenberg	400.6	Mansfeld L.; Harz/S-A NRP	Gorenzen, Grillenberg, Wippra	MSH	S-A	S Harz Karst Landscape BR, near: Pferdeköpfe Pass; S: Hagenbach, S: Sengelbach	
Großer Mittelberg (Ellrich)	400.1	South Harz; South Harz NRP	Ellrich, Sülzhayn	NMH	TH		
Schalkenburg	400.1	Lower Harz; Harz/S-A NRP	Alexisbad, Mägdesprung	HZ	S-A	Köthener Hütte (Schutzhütte on the Kapellenfelsen), Upper Selke Valley NR	
Frauenstein	400	South Harz; Harz NRP (LS)	Scharzfeld	UA-OHA; OHA	LS	auf Nachbar-Bergsporn: Scharzfels Castle ruins	
Großer Hausberg (q. v. Hausberg)	397.9	Upper Harz; Harz/S-A NRP	Mägdesprung, Meisdorf	HZ	S-A	Anhalt Castle ruins, Upper Selke Valley NR	Foundation of the bergfried of Anhalt Castle on the Großer Hausberg
Agnesberg	395.1	Upper Harz; Harz/S-A NRP	Wernigerode	HZ	S-A	Altar of Truth (Altar der Wahrheit), near, on the Burgberg: Wernigerode Castle	
Salzberg	394.4	Lower Harz; Harz/S-A NRP	Blankenburg	HZ	S-A	near: Michaelstein Abbey; S: Schmerlenbach	
Müncheberg	392.5	South Harz; South Harz NRP	Appenrode	NMH	TH		
Hagedornsberg	391.1	Lower Harz; Harz/S-A NRP	Treseburg	Harz	S-A	near: Bode Gorge, near: Sonnenklippe	
Brandköpfe	391	South Harz; Harz NRP (LS)	Scharzfeld	UA-OHA; OHA	LS	Unicorn Cave (NM)	
Braunkohlberg (Braunekohlberg)	388.0	Upper Harz; Harz/S-A NRP	Hasserode, Wernigerode	HZ	S-A		
Burgberg (Herrmannsacker)	387.5	South Harz; South Harz NRP	Herrmannsacker	NMH	TH	Ebersburg ruins	The bergfried of the Ebersburg on the Burgberg
Zankköpfe	387.1	South Harz; South Harz NRP	Werna	NMH	TH		
Großer Dörnsenberg	386.4	South Harz; South Harz NRP	Ellrich	NMH	TH		
Heidberg	386.2	South Harz; South Harz NRP	Ellrich, Sülzhayn	NMH	TH		
Butterberg (Bad Lauterberg)	379	Harz Foreland-S	Bad Lauterberg	OHA	LS	Süd- and Südostflanke:Butterberg/Hopfenbusch NR	
Amelungskopf	378.6	Upper Harz; Harz/S-A NRP	Wernigerode	HZ	S-A	Zwölfmorgentalschanzen	
Hohe Warte	375	Mansfeld L.; Harz/S-A NRP	Ballenstedt	HZ	S-A	Ex: watchtower site	
Sackberg	374.4	South Harz; South Harz NRP	Sülzhayn	NMH	TH		
Pufferberg	373.3	Lower Harz; Harz/S-A NRP	Annarode, Pölsfeld	MSH	S-A	S Harz Karst Landscape BR, Pölsfeld Gypsum Karst Landscape NR	
Ziegenberg (Braunschwende)	371.2	Lower Harz	Braunschwende	MSH	S-A	Ziegenberg NR	
Schloßkopf (Neustadt)	371.1	South Harz; South Harz NRP	Neustadt	NMH	TH		
Hirschplatte	364.2	Mansfeld L.; Harz/S-A NRP	Mägdesprung, Meisdorf, Pansfelde	HZ	S-A	near: Selke Valley NR, near: Site of Old Falkenstein Castle	
Mühlberg	363.8	South Harz; South Harz NRP	Appenrode	NMH	TH		
Eichenberg (Herrmannsacker)	363.2	South Harz; South Harz NRP	Herrmannsacker	NMH	TH	near: Iberg Dam (FRB)	
Kleiner Teichtalskopf	362	South Harz; Harz NLP, Harz NRP (LS)	Herzberg	UA-OHA; OHA	LS	Siebertal NR	
Königskopf	357.7	Alter Stolberg; South Harz NRP	Stempeda	NMH	TH	Alter Stolberg NR	Spatenberg (links) and Königskopf (right) with Dorf Stempeda in the foreground
Kakemieke (Kakemike)	356.4	Upper Harz; Harz/S-A NRP	Wernigerode	HZ	S-A		
Burgberg (Stecklenberg)	356.1	Ramberg; Harz/S-A NRP	Stecklenberg	HZ	S-A	Kleine and Große; Ruins of Lauenburg, near: Ruins of Stecklenburg, near: Geroldsklippen	Bergfried der Kleinen Lauenburg on the Burgberg
Burgberg (Gernrode)	355	Ramberg; Harz/S-A NRP	Gernrode	HZ	S-A	Ruins of Heinrichsburg	
Heimberg (Wolfshagen)	352.5	Upper Harz, LS	Wolfshagen	UA-GS; GS	LS	Former diabase quarry	
Calviusberg	352.4	Lower Harz; Harz/S-A NRP	Blankenburg	HZ	S-A	Ruins of Luisenburg	
Hoher Kopf (Roßla)	332.0	Lower Harz; Harz/S-A NRP	Roßla, Breitungen	MSH	S-A	S Harz Karst Landscape BR, Questenberg Gypsum Karst Landscape NR; near: transmission tower	
Buchholzer Berg	350.0	Rüdigsdorf S.; South Harz NRP	Buchholz, Petersdorf	NMH	TH		
Mettenberg	347.5	Mansfeld L.; Harz/S-A NRP	Meisdorf, Ballenstedt	HZ	S-A		
Kleiner Mittelberg	346.2	South Harz; South Harz NRP	Ellrich, Sülzhayn	NMH	TH		
Römerstein	345.0	South Harz; Harz NRP (LS)	Bad Sachsa, Tettenborn	OHA	LS	Weißensee and Steinatal NR (with Nussteich, Weißensee and Steinaer Bachtal)	
Ratskopf	343.2	Upper Harz; Harz/S-A NRP	Wernigerode	HZ	S-A		
Geiersberg	339.8	Lower Harz; Harz/S-A NRP	Breitungen, Rosperwenda, Uftrungen	MSH	S-A	near:Questenberg Gypsum Karst Landscape NR	
Langenberg (Walkenried)	339	South Harz; Harz NRP (LS), South Harz NRP	Walkenried, Ellrich	OHA, NMH	LS, TH	transmission tower, near: Gipskarstlandschaft Bad Sachsa and Walkenried Gypsum Karst Landscape NR, near: Itelteich NR, near: Juliushütte NR; near: Itelteich	
Falkenstein (Pansfelde)	335.6	Mansfeld L.; Harz/S-A NRP	Mägdesprung, Meisdorf, Pansfelde	HZ	S-A	Site of Old Falkenstein Castle	
Kohnstein	334.9	South Harz; South Harz NRP	Herreden, Hörningen, Krimderode, Niedersachswerfen, Nordhausen	NMH	TH	Bergbau, Mittelbau-Dora Concentration Camp memorial site	The Kohnstein near Niedersachswerfen (1945)
Blankenstein	334	Lower Harz; Harz/S-A NRP	Blankenburg	HZ	S-A	Blankenburg Castle	View from Blankenburg of Blankenburg Castle on the Blankenstein
Hoher Kopf (east of Questenberg)	332.0	Lower Harz; Harz/S-A NRP	Hainrode, Questenberg	MSH	S-A	S Harz Karst Landscape BR, Questenberg Gypsum Karst Landscape NR	
Heidelberg (Blankenburg) (Part of the Teufelsmauer)	331.5	Lower Harz; Harz/S-A NRP	Blankenburg	HZ	S-A	Teufelsmauer	
Reesberg	325.2	Alter Stolberg; South Harz NRP, Harz/S-A NRP	Uftrungen, Urbach	NMH; MSH	TH; S-A	Heimkehle Gypsum Karst Landscape NR, Heimkehle Cave	
Alte Burg (Alteburg) (Gernrode)	325	Ramberg; Harz/S-A NRP	Gernrode, Rieder	HZ	S-A	Site of the "Old Castle" (Alte Burg), Alte Burg NR	
Butterberg (Bad Harzburg)	325	Upper Harz	Bad Harzburg	GS	LS	Butterberggelände NR; transmission tower	
Junkerberg	324.0	Harz Foreland-S; South Harz NRP	Hörningen, Mauderode	NMH	TH		
Weidenberg	322.9	Rüdigsdorf S.; South Harz NRP	Rüdigsdorf	NMH	TH	Rüdigsdorf Switzerland NR	
Ankenberg	321.1	Lower Harz; Harz/S-A NRP	Drebsdorf, Großleinungen, Hainrode	MSH	S-A	S Harz Karst Landscape BR, Questenberg Gypsum Karst Landscape NR	
Kleiner Balkenberg (…Bakenberg)	321.1	Upper Harz, Harz NRP (LS)	Hahausen	UA-GS; GS	LS		
Sattelköpfe (q. v. Sattelkopf)	320.7	Harz Foreland-S; South Harz NRP	Hörningen, Woffleben	NMH	TH	Sattelköpfe NR (Hörninger Kuppen)	
Ölbergshöhe	320.6	Mansfeld L.; Harz/S-A NRP	Bad Suderode, Gernrode	HZ	S-A	Preußenturm OT (Ex: Thomas-Müntzer-Turm; on the Schwedderberg)	
Großer Buchberg	320.4	Lower Harz; Harz/S-A NRP	Drebsdorf, Großleinungen, Wallhausen	MSH	S-A	S Harz Karst Landscape BR	
Falkenstein (Meisdorf)	320	Mansfeld L.; Harz/S-A NRP	Mägdesprung, Meisdorf, Pansfelde	HZ	S-A	Falkenstein Castle	Falkenstein Castle on the Falkenstein
Sandkopf	317.6	South Harz; South Harz NRP	Appenrode	NMH	TH		
Harzrigi (Petersdorfer Berg)	316.6	Rüdigsdorf S.; South Harz NRP	Petersdorf	NMH	TH	Harz-Rigi inn, transmission tower	
Ziegenberg (Heimburg)	315.7	Harz Foreland-N; Harz/S-A NRP	Benzingerode, Heimburg	HZ	S-A	Ziegenberg bei Heimburg NR	
Burgberg (Ilfeld)	312.9	South Harz; South Harz NRP	Ilfeld	NMH	TH	Ilburg ruins	Coloured black and white photograph: the Burgberg in the centre of Ilfeld (around 1900)
Eichenberg (Petersdorf)	310.7	Rüdigsdorf S.; South Harz NRP	Petersdorf	NMH	TH		
Schlößchenkopf (Sangerhausen)	310.3	Lower Harz; Harz/S-A NRP	Lengefeld, Sangerhausen	MSH	S-A	S Harz Karst Landscape BR, Moltkewarte OT	Observation Tower Moltkewarte on the Schlößchenkopf
Hoppelberg (Langenstein)	307.9	Harz Foreland-N; Harz/S-A NRP	Börnecke, Langenstein	HZ	S-A	Hoppelberg NR	
Butterberg (Sangerhausen)	307.6	Lower Harz; Harz/S-A NRP	Großleinungen, Sangerhausen	MSH	S-A	S Harz Karst Landscape BR	
Ziegenberg (Ballenstedt)	306.1	Mansfeld L.; Harz/S-A NRP	Ballenstedt	HZ	S-A	Kunstteich Ballenstedt, TSP Hirschteich	
Struvenberg	305.7	Harz Foreland-N; Harz/S-A NRP	Benzingerode, Heimburg	HZ	S-A	Site of Struvenburg Castle, Ziegenberg bei Heimburg NR	View from the Ziegenberg of the Struvenberg and the Ziegenberg bei Heimburg Nature Reserve
Friedrichshohenberg	305.3	Mansfeld L.; Harz/S-A NRP	Endorf, Ermsleben, Meisdorf, Neuplatendorf	HZ	S-A	Friedrichshohenberg NR	
Karrberg	304.1	Upper Harz; Harz/S-A NRP	Darlingerode, Drübeck	HZ	S-A		
Kuhberg (Rüdigsdorf)	302.7	Rüdigsdorf S.; South Harz NRP	Rüdigsdorf	NMH	TH	Rüdigsdorf Switzerland NR	
Pfennigsberg	300.3	Rüdigsdorf S.; South Harz NRP	Petersdorf	NMH	TH		
Butterberg (Osterode)	300	Upper Harz	Osterode	OHA	LS	Butterberg Tunnel (B 241), near: Alte Burg	
Bornberg	295.5	Rüdigsdorf S.; South Harz NRP	Rüdigsdorf	NMH	TH	Rüdigsdorf Switzerland NR	
Lichte Höhe	295.5	Rüdigsdorf S.; South Harz NRP	Rüdigsdorf	NMH	TH		
Regenstein	293.9	Harz Foreland-N; Harz/S-A NRP	Blankenburg, Heimburg	HZ	S-A	Ruins of Regenstein Castle	View from the Ziegenberg with the village of Heimburg in the foreground to the ruins of Regenstein Castle on the northwestern spur of the Regenstein
Austberg (Augsberg/Augstberg)	292.0	Harz Foreland-N; Harz/S-A NRP	Benzingerode	HZ	S-A	Austbergturm OT (Augs-/Augstbergturm)	View from the southeast over Bezingerode to the Austberg and Austberg Tower
Zinkenberg	290.5	Alter Stolberg; South Harz NRP	Leimbach, Steigerthal	NMH	TH		
Haardtberg	286.8	Lower Harz; Harz/S-A NRP	Kleinleinungen, Wickerode	MSH	S-A	S Harz Karst Landscape BR, Questenberg Gypsum Karst Landscape NR	
Armsberg (Wickerode)	281.8	Lower Harz; Harz/S-A NRP	Wickerode	MSH	S-A	S Harz Karst Landscape BR, Questenberg Gypsum Karst Landscape NR	
Burgberg (Heimburg)	280.9	Harz Foreland-N; Harz/S-A NRP	Heimburg	HZ	S-A	Ruins of Heimburg (Alteburg, Altenburg)	
Burgberg (Questenberg)	280	Lower Harz; Harz/S-A NRP	Questenberg	MSH	S-A	S Harz Karst Landscape BR, Questenberg Gypsum Karst Landscape NR, Questenberg Castle ruins, near: Queste	View from the Queste to the Burgberg and Questenberg Castle (front) and southern slope of the Hohe Kopf (rear)
Butterberg (Ilsenburg)	280	Harz Foreland-N; Harz/S-A NRP	Ilsenburg, Drübeck	HZ	S-A		
Distelkopf (Schableite)	278.9	Alter Stolberg; South Harz NRP, Harz/S-A NRP	Urbach, Uftrungen	NMH; MSH	TH; S-A	near:Heimkehle Gypsum Karst Landscape NR, near: Heimkehle gypsum cave; S: Lohbach	
Stöckey	277.8	Rüdigsdorf S.; South Harz NRP	Krimderode	NMH	TH	Rüdigsdorf Switzerland NR	
Glockenstein	273.2	Rüdigsdorf S.; South Harz NRP	Niedersachswerfen	NMH	TH		
Danielskopf	272.6	Rüdigsdorf S.; South Harz NRP	Krimderode	NMH	TH	Rüdigsdorf Switzerland NR	
Stahlsberg	270.6	Mansfeld L.; Harz/S-A NRP	Ballenstedt, Opperode	HZ	S-A	Ballenstedt Bismarck Tower OT	
Lustberg	267.5	Harz Foreland-N; Harz/S-A NRP	Wernigerode, Charlottenlust	HZ	S-A		
Iberg (Herrmannsacker)	265	South Harz; South Harz NRP	Herrmannsacker	NMH	TH	Iberg Dam (FRB)	
Sichelberg	263.0	Rüdigsdorf S.; South Harz NRP	Krimderode, (Ellersiedlung)	NMH	TH	Rüdigsdorf Switzerland NR	
Großer Rönneberg (q. v. Großer Ronneberg)	257.6	Harz Foreland-N; Harz/S-A NRP	Blankenburg, Börnecke	HZ	S-A		
Brommelsberg	256.3	Rüdigsdorf S.; South Harz NRP	Nordhausen	NMH	TH		
Saßberg	256.0	Harz Foreland-N; Harz/S-A NRP	Stapelburg, Veckenstedt	HZ	S-A		
Kirchberg	252.9	Rüdigsdorf S.; South Harz NRP	Niedersachswerfen	NMH	TH		
Bückeberg	250.0	Harz Foreland-N; Harz/S-A NRP	Gernrode, Rieder	HZ	S-A	Ex: Limequarry, transmission tower	
Münchenberg	247.3	Harz Foreland-N; Harz/S-A NRP	Bad Suderode, Neinstedt, Stecklenberg	HZ	S-A	Münchenberg NR	
Kuhberg (Krimderode)	245.5	Rüdigsdorf S.; South Harz NRP	Krimderode, (Ellersiedlung)	NMH	TH		
Gegensteine; Große Gegensteine: Kleine Gegensteine:	243.6; 243.6; 230	Harz Foreland-N; Harz/S-A NRP	Badeborn, Ballenstedt	HZ	S-A	Gegensteine–Schierberg NR, Felsen with OP, near: Flugplatz Ballenstedt	
Schierberge	243.0	Harz Foreland-N; Harz/S-A NRP	Ballenstedt, Rieder	HZ	S-A	Gegensteine–Schierberg NR, near: Roseburg, (and OT, Schlosspark, Wasserkaskade)	
Burgberg, (Ermsleben)	236.2	Mansfeld L.; Harz/S-A NRP	Endorf, Ermsleben, Meisdorf, Neuplatendorf	HZ	S-A	Konradsburg	View from the west of the Burgberg and the Konradsburg
Kleiner Rönneberg (q. v. Kleiner Ronneberg)	231.9	Harz Foreland-N; Harz/S-A NRP	Blankenburg, Börnecke	HZ	S-A		
Tierstein (in the Osterholz)	230.4	Harz Foreland-N; Harz/S-A NRP	Heimburg, Langenstein	HZ	S-A		
Thekenberge (Kalte Warte)	225.8	Harz Foreland-N; Harz/S-A NRP	Börnecke, Halberstadt, Harsleben, Langenstein	HZ	S-A	Gläserner Mönch (Sandsteinfelsen), Harslebener Berge and Steinholz NR, Gedenkstätte Langenstein-Zwieberge	View from the Gläsernen Mönch auf den Thekenbergen nach Halbstadt with Höhenzug Huy in the background
Seweckenberge	214.8	Harz Foreland-N; Harz/S-A NRP	Badeborn, Quedlinburg	HZ	S-A	Seweckenwarte OT, Ruins of Gersdorf Castle	
Ruhmberg	196.0	Harz Foreland-N; Harz/S-A NRP	Badeborn	HZ	S-A	War memorial to the (Franco-Prussian War)	
Klusberge	192.4	Harz Foreland-N; Harz/S-A NRP	Halberstadt	HZ	S-A		
Königstein (Westerhausen)	189.0	Harz Foreland-N; Harz/S-A NRP	Westerhausen	HZ	S-A	Kamelfelsen, evtl. Stone Age cultic site	View from Westerhausen to the Königstein
Lasterberg	188.8	Harz Foreland-N; Harz/S-A NRP	Westerhausen	HZ	S-A		
Mittelsteine (Weddersleben) (Part of the Teufelsmauer)	185.2	Lower Harz; Harz/S-A NRP	Weddersleben	HZ	S-A	Teufelsmauer, Teufelsmauer NR	Die Mittelsteine der Teufelsmauer
Königstein (Weddersleben) (Part of the Teufelsmauer)	184.5	Lower Harz; Harz/S-A NRP	Weddersleben	HZ	S-A	Teufelsmauer, Teufelsmauer NR	View roughly von Ostsüdosten über diagonal verlaufende Bode hinweg to the Teufelsmauer with dem Königstein and den dahinter gelegenen Mittelsteinen; links liegt Neinstedt and right Weddersleben
Spiegelsberge	180.3	Harz Foreland-N; Harz/S-A NRP	Halberstadt	HZ	S-A	Belvedere OT, Schloss Spiegelsberge with Gröninger Fass, Spiegel-Mausoleum, Tiergarten Halberstadt	Observation Tower Belvedere auf den Spiegelsbergen
Jätchenberg	178.1	Harz Foreland-N; Harz/S-A NRP	Westerhausen	HZ	S-A		
Blankenburger Kopf (Part of the Spiegelsberge)	177.9	Harz Foreland-N; Harz/S-A NRP	Halberstadt	HZ	S-A	Bismarck Tower, Halberstadt (OT)	

== Mountains and hills of unknown elevation ==
These are mountains and hills whose elevations are not known/yet researched:

Mountain, hill or, high point	Elevation (m)	Harz region; NLP, NRP	Location Villages (near/between)	County, counties or unincorporated area (see below)	Land/ Länder (see below)	Location of: (sights; streams/springs); (Location in/at: BR, NR)	Image
Burgberg (Neustadt)	???	South Harz; South Harz NRP	Neustadt	NMH	TH	Ruins of Heinrichsburg	
Burgberg (Wernigerode)	???	Upper Harz; Harz/S-A NRP	Wernigerode	HZ	S-A	Schloss Wernigerode	Coloured black and white photograph: the Burgberg with Wernigerode Castle (between 1890 and 1905)

== Height unknown ==
These are mountains and hills whose height is unknown or not yet researched:

Mountain, Hill, High point	Height (m)	Harzteil; NLP, NRP	Lage Ortschaften (near/between)	GG; County/ counties (see below)	State(s) (see below)	Location of (Sights; waterbodies/springs); (Located in/by: BPR, NSG)	Image
Burgberg (Neustadt) (51°33′48.5″N 10°50′59.7″E)	???	South Harz; South Harz NRP	Neustadt	NDH	TH	Ruins of Heinrichsburg	
Harzburg (51°35′19.3″N 10°45′26″E)	???	South Harz; South Harz NRP	Appenrode, Ilfeld	NDH	TH	near: Braunsteinhaus inn	

== Abbreviations ==
The meanings of abbreviations found in the table are given below:

Counties (using county number plate letters):

- GS = Goslar (Lower Saxony)
- HZ = Harz (Saxony-Anhalt)
- MSH = Mansfeld-Südharz (Saxony-Anhalt)
- OHA = Osterode am Harz (Lower Saxony)
- NMH = Nordhausen (Thuringia)

Unincorporated areas (UA):

- UA-GS = Harz UA in Goslar county
- UA-OHA = Harz UA in Osterode am Harz county

German states:

- LS = Lower Saxony
- S-A = Saxony-Anhalt
- TH = Thuringia

Countries:

- FRG = Federal Republic of Germany
- GDR = German Democratic Republic
- USSR = Union of Soviet Socialist Republics

National parks

- Harz NLP = Harz National Park

Nature parks:

- Harz NRP (LS) = Harz Nature Park (Lower Saxony)
- Harz/S-A NRP = Harz/Saxony-Anhalt Nature Park
- South Harz NRP = South Harz Nature Park

Special:

- B = Bundesstraße i.e. federal road
- BNM = Bundesnachrichtendienst, the Federal German Intelligence Service
- BR = biosphere reserve
- BW = Bundeswehr (FRG)
- CD = cultural monument
- E = East[ern]
- Ex = former
- Gr = Große, Großer i.e. Great
- GRU = Glawnoje Raswedywatelnoje Uprawlenije (USSR)
- FRB = Flood retention basin
- HS = hydropower station
- IC = United States Intelligence Community
- Kl = Kleine, Kleiner i.e. Small
- L = Landesstraße i.e. state road
- Mansfeld L. = Mansfeld Land
- MfS = Ministerium für Staatssicherheit (i.e. the Stasi; GDR)
- Mon = monument
- N = north[ern]
- NM = natural monument
- NLP = national park
- NNE = North-northeast[ern]
- NRP = Nature park
- NR = nature reserve
- OP = observation platform / viewing point
- OT = observation tower
- PSF = Pumped storage facility
- Rüdigsdorf S. = Rüdigsdorf Switzerland
- S = Source (river)
- S = South[ern]
- s. a. = see also
- UA = unincorporated area
- WT = water tower
- YH = youth hostel

== See also ==
- List of rock formations in the Harz
- List of the highest mountains in Germany
- List of the highest mountains in the German states
- List of mountain and hill ranges in Germany
- List of mountains and hills of Thuringia
- List of mountains and hills in Saxony-Anhalt
- List of mountains and hills in Lower Saxony
