= Harz (disambiguation) =

Harz is a large mountain range in Germany. Harz may refer also refer to:

== People ==
- Harz (surname)

== Places ==
- Harz National Park, a nature reserve in the German federal states of Lower Saxony and Saxony-Anhalt
- Harz (district), district in Saxony-Anhalt
- Harz (Landkreis Goslar), unincorporated area in Goslar district, Lower Saxony
- Harz (Landkreis Göttingen), unincorporated area in Göttingen district, Lower Saxony
