= Ziegenkopf =

Ziegenkopf may refer to:

- Ziegenkopf (Habichtswald), a mountain of Hesse, Germany
- Ziegenkopf (Harz), a hill in the Harz mountains, Saxony-Anhalt, Germany
