= Stierbergsteich =

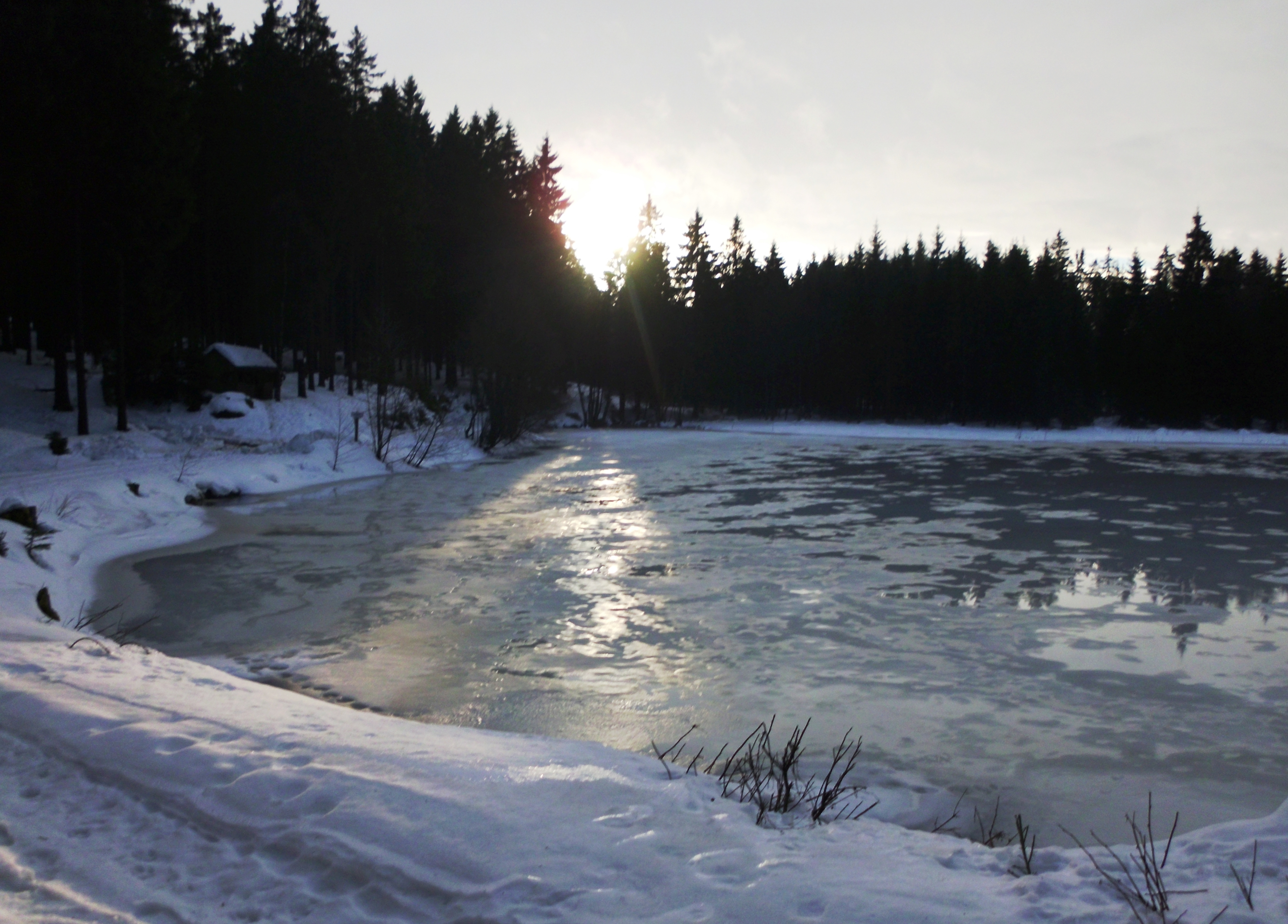
- The Stierbergsteich between Rothesütte and Sophienhof in the South Harz
- Interactive map of Stierbergsteich
- Location: Harz; counties of Harz and Nordhausen; Saxony-Anhalt and Thuringia
- Coordinates: 51.641556°N 10.756194°E

Dam and spillways
- Impounds: Dammbach tributary

Power Station
- Hydraulic head: ca. 555 m above sea level (NN)

The Stierbergsteich in the Harz Mountains of central Germany is a storage pond near Rothesütte on the boundary of the counties of Harz (Saxony-Anhalt) and Nordhausen (Thuringia).

== Location ==
The Stierbergsteich lies in the South Harz on the boundary of the nature parks of Harz (Saxony-Anhalt) and South Harz (Thuringia) between Trautenstein to the north-northeast (Saxony-Anhalt), Rothesütte to the southwest and Sophienhof to the east-southeast (both in Thuringia). The pond is located between the Buchenköpfe (603.1 m above sea level (NN)) peaks and the Stierberg (602.4 m above sea level (NN)) to the east-northeast at an elevation of about 555 m above NN. It is fed and drained by a small tributary of the Rappbode tributary, the Dammbach.

The border between the kingdoms of Prussia and Hanover used to run past the pond along what is now the border between Saxony-Anhalt and Thuringia.

== Purpose ==
The Stierbergsteich was artificially created in order to impound water for an overshot water wheel sited further downstream. The wheel drove pumps that lifted pit water out of the shafts of nearby mines in which red iron ore (haematite) was mainly extracted.

== Hiking ==
The Stierbergsteich is no. 48 in the system of checkpoints of the Harzer Wandernadel hiking network. The box with the stamp hangs in a refuge hut on the southeastern shore of the pond (51°38′28.6″N 10°45′23.65″E).
