= Bocksberg (Harz) =

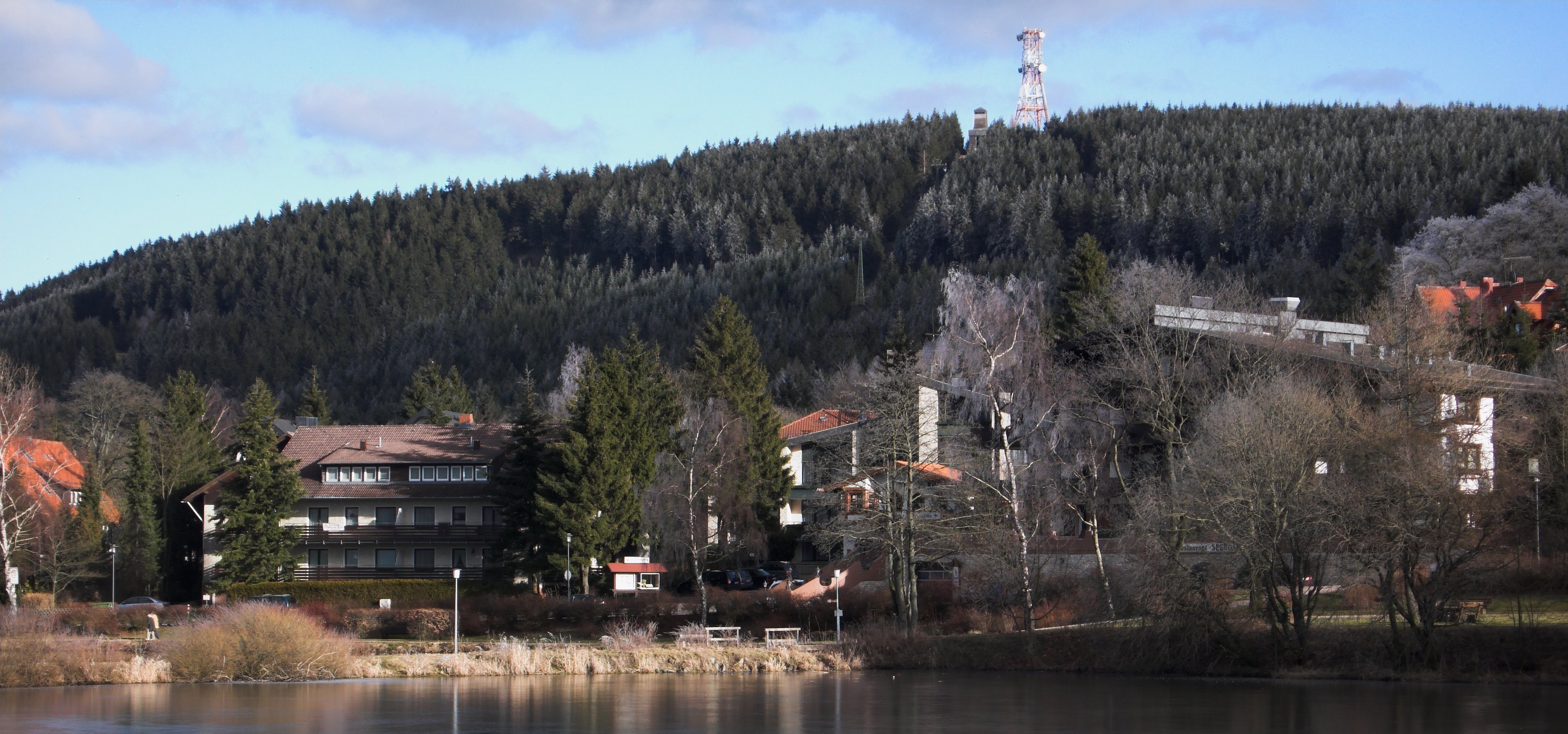
- West side of the Bocksberg with the village of Hahnenklee in the foreground

Highest point
- Elevation: 726 m above sea level (NN) (2,382 ft)
- Coordinates: 51°51′25″N 10°21′25″E

Geography
- Location within Lower Saxony
- Location: Lower Saxony, Germany
- Parent range: Harz Mountains

The Bocksberg is the local mountain for the village of Hahnenklee in the borough of Goslar in the German state of Lower Saxony. It lies southeast of this spa village in the Harz mountains and is 726 m above sea level (NN).

It was from here that a 1,350 m (4,429 ft) long bobsleigh and racing toboggan run was laid in 1928, which had to be closed for technical and financial reasons in 1970. Although this mountain lay in the British Zone after the Second World War, the US Army operated a relay station here for their radio traffic between Frankfurt and Berlin. Its red and white transmission mast is used today for mobile telephone communications. It projects above the surrounding trees and is visible from a long way off.

On the summit of the Bocksberg there is a restaurant and a wooden observation tower that was built in 1976.

== Gondola lift ==
The Bocksberg Lift is a 1,100 m long, gondola lift built in 1970 with small cabins. It runs from Hahnenklee to the Bocksberg.

Following the fall of an empty gondola in July 2006 the lift was taken out of service for several months, because sabotage or tampering had to be considered as possible causes. At the end of 2006 the lift was opened again.

In Winter the lift is used by skiers. In summer, mountain bikes may be transported to the summit in special baskets. From the top there are several pistes and downhill routes back to the village.

== See also ==
- List of mountains and hills in Lower Saxony
- List of mountains in the Harz
