= Dehnenkopf =

- Location within Lower Saxony

Highest point
- Elevation: 775 m above sea level (NN) (2,543 ft)
- Coordinates: 51°48′21″N 10°31′17″E

Geography
- Location: near Torfhaus, Goslar county, Lower Saxony, Germany
- Parent range: Harz Mountains (Upper Harz)

The Dehnenkopf in the Harz Mountains of central Germany is a summit about 775 m above sea level (NN) near Torfhaus in the unincorporated area of Harz in the county of Goslar in Lower Saxony.

== Location ==
The Dehnenkopf lies in the Upper Harz in the Harz National Park; immediately to the west is the Harz Nature Park. The Dehnenkopf rises about 1.1 km west-northwest of Torfhaus, a village in the mining borough of Altenau. To the east are the Lerchenköpfe peaks (821 m) and to the west is the Mittelberg (667.1 m). Towards the southwest the countryside transitions to the Bruchberg (ca. 927 m). On the north flank of the Dehnenkopf rise two tributaries of the River Oker: the Kalbe and the Kellerwasser, which flows through the valley of Kellwassertal. A little tributary stream of the Kellwasser, the Nabe, flows by to the west. Around 500 metres northeast of the summit runs the B 4 federal road, from which the Landesstraße 504 branches off in Torfhaus heading roughly westwards as the Steile-Wand-Straße to Altenau.

== Height ==
The Dehnenkopf is about 775 m high. A few metres to the west-northwest of its summit is a spot height marked on topographic maps that gives a height of 773.6 m.

== Hiking ==
About 600 metres southwest of the top of the Dehnenkopf lies the die Jungfernklippe (51°48′14.7″N 10°30′48.7″E), which reaches a maximum elevation of 660 m. The rock formation is no. 221 in the system of checkpoints in the Harzer Wandernadel hiking network. The checkpoint box is located a few metres east of the tor on a gravelled forest track and hiking trail, which runs gently downhill towards the southeast to near the beginning of the Dammgraben, a water channel that is part of the Upper Harz Water Regale.
