= Börnecke =

- Ortsteil of Blankenburg (Harz)
- Interactive map of Börnecke
- Location within Germany Location within Saxony-Anhalt
- Coordinates: 51°49′15″N 11°01′50″E
- Country: Germany
- State: Saxony-Anhalt
- District: Harz
- Town: Blankenburg (Harz)

Area
  - Total: 15 km^{2} (5.8 sq mi)
- Elevation: 210 m (690 ft)

Population
  - Total: 594
  - Density: 40/km^{2} (100/sq mi)
- Time zone: UTC+01:00 (CET)
  - Summer (DST): UTC+02:00 (CEST)
- Postal codes: 38889
- Dialling codes: 03944

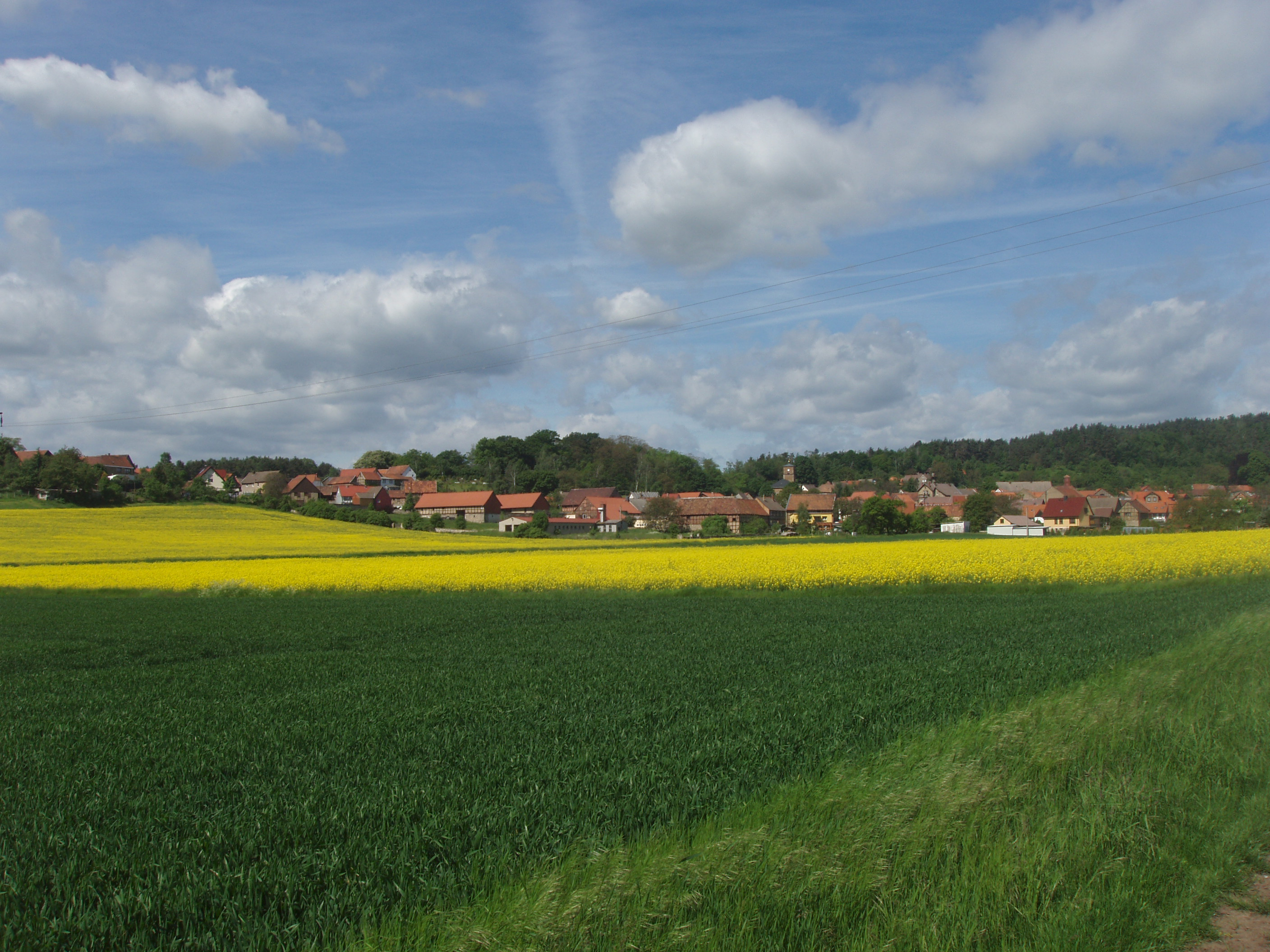
View of Börnecke from the east

Börnecke is a village in the northern Harz Foreland in the central German district of Harz in Saxony-Anhalt. Since 1993 it is part of the town Blankenburg (Harz).

== Sources ==
- 1000 Jahre Börnecke, Hrsg. Arbeitsgruppe Chronik, 2006
- Blankenburg in Vergangenheit und Gegenwart, Hrsg. Ortsleitung der SED und Rat der Stadt Blankenburg, 1979
- Lebenswege - Archäologie an der B 6n - Begleitheft zur Sonderausstellung im Schlossmuseum Quedlinburg, Hrsg. Harald Meller, 2005
