= Lerbach, Osterode am Harz =

Lerbach
- Village of Osterode am Harz
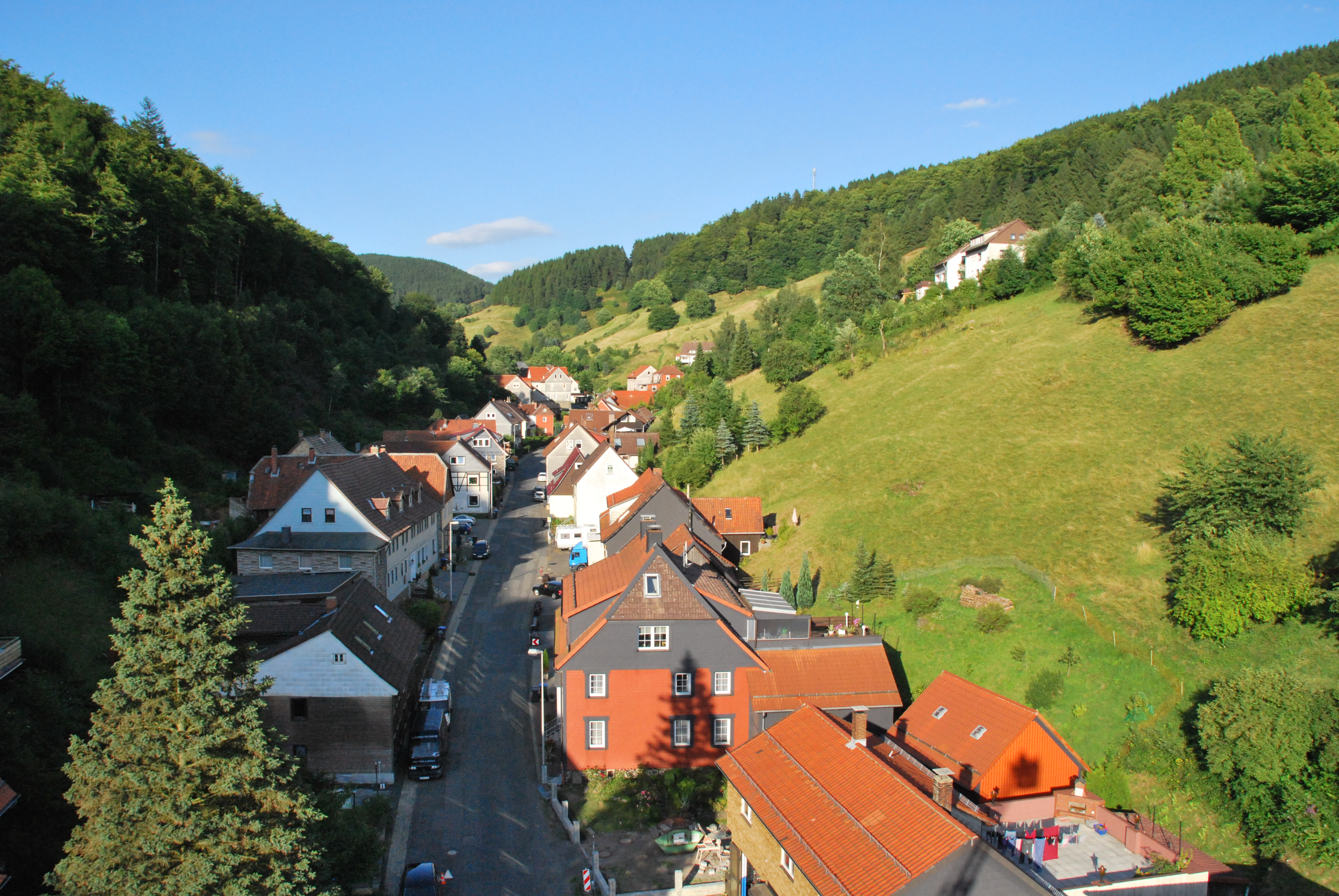

- Coat of arms
- Interactive map of Lerbach
- Location within Germany Location within Lower Saxony
- Coordinates: 51°45′31″N 10°18′18″E
- Country: Germany
- State: Lower Saxony
- District: Göttingen
- Town: Osterode am Harz
- Founded: 1551

Government
  - Mayor: Frank Koch (SPD)
- Elevation: 300–400 m (980–1,310 ft)

Population (2012)
  - Total: 990
- Time zone: UTC+01:00 (CET)
  - Summer (DST): UTC+02:00 (CEST)
- Postal codes: 37520
- Dialling codes: 05522
- Vehicle registration: OHA
- Website: Lerbach.de

Lerbach is a village of Osterode am Harz in Lower Saxony, Germany. It is based in the south-western part of the Harz mountains.

== People ==
- Wilhelm Kolle (1868-1935), bacteriologist and hygienist
