= Kapellenklippe =

Coordinates: 51°47′10.5″N 10°39′21.8″E

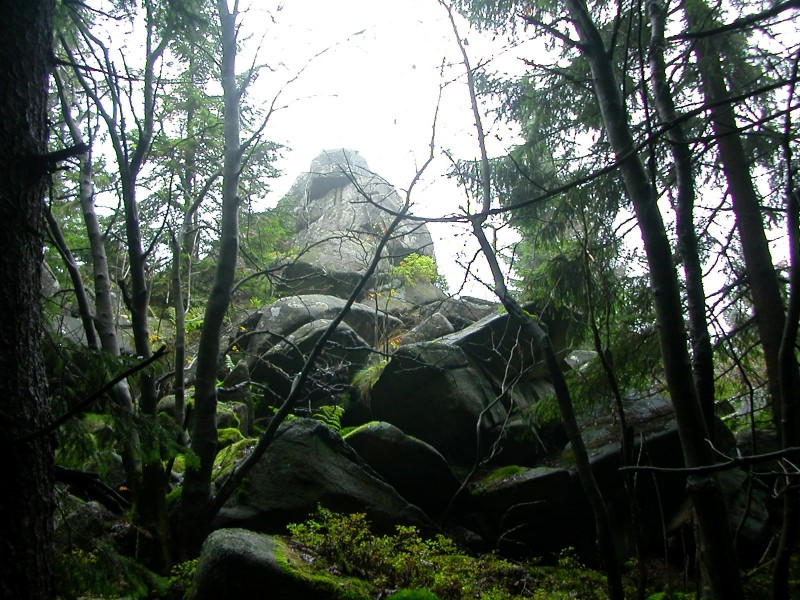
The Kapellenklippe

The Kapellenklippe is a tor near the Glassworks Way (Glashüttenweg) on the Renneckenberg mountain in the High Harz in central Germany within the borough of Wernigerode. The tor is in a remote spot in the Harz National Park and can only be reached over unsigned paths. The summit of the rocks is 927 m above sea level and looks a bit like a bell. The tor is a popular destination for climbers. From its summit there is a view towards the Brocken. The tor is almost completely overgrown with pine trees and only projects a few metres above the tops of the trees.
