= Harz (Landkreis Göttingen) =

Place in Lower Saxony, Germany

- Unincorporated area
- Location of the unincorporated area of Harz in the district of Göttingen
- Interactive map of Harz
- Location within Germany Location within Lower Saxony
- Coordinates: 51°43′N 10°24′E
- Country: Germany
- State: Lower Saxony
- District: Göttingen

Area
  - Total: 267.35 km^{2} (103.22 sq mi)

Population (2025-12-31)
  - Total: 0
  - Density: 0.0/km^{2} (0.0/sq mi)
- Time zone: UTC+01:00 (CET)
  - Summer (DST): UTC+02:00 (CEST)

The administrative district (Verwaltungsbezirk) of Harz (Landkreis Göttingen) is an unincorporated area in the German district of Göttingen. Until the merger of the old districts of Osterode am Harz and Göttingen, it was known as "Harz (Landkreis Osterode am Harz)".

== Geography ==
It is the second largest unincorporated area in Germany with an area of 267.35 km^{2} and is entirely uninhabited.

Although it has no recorded population, for administrative reasons it has an official municipality key (Amtlicher Gemeindeschlüssel). The area covers large parts of the district of Göttingen and transitions towards the northeast into the district of Goslar.

== Administration ==
The administration of unincorporated areas in the districts of Göttingen and Goslar, about 98 per cent of which is state forest, is carried out by the Lower Saxon forestry office of Clausthal, which also generates the requisite vital records (birth certificates and death certificates) when required, as well as being responsible as a public authority for safety and law and order. This is a practice that goes back to the mining history of the Harz.
