= Ortberg =

Ortberg is a surname. Notable people with the surname include:

- Daniel Mallory Ortberg (born 1986), American author
- John Ortberg (born 1957), American evangelical Christian
- Kelly Ortberg (born 1960), American business executive

== See also ==
- Östberg
