= Ziegenkopf (Harz) =

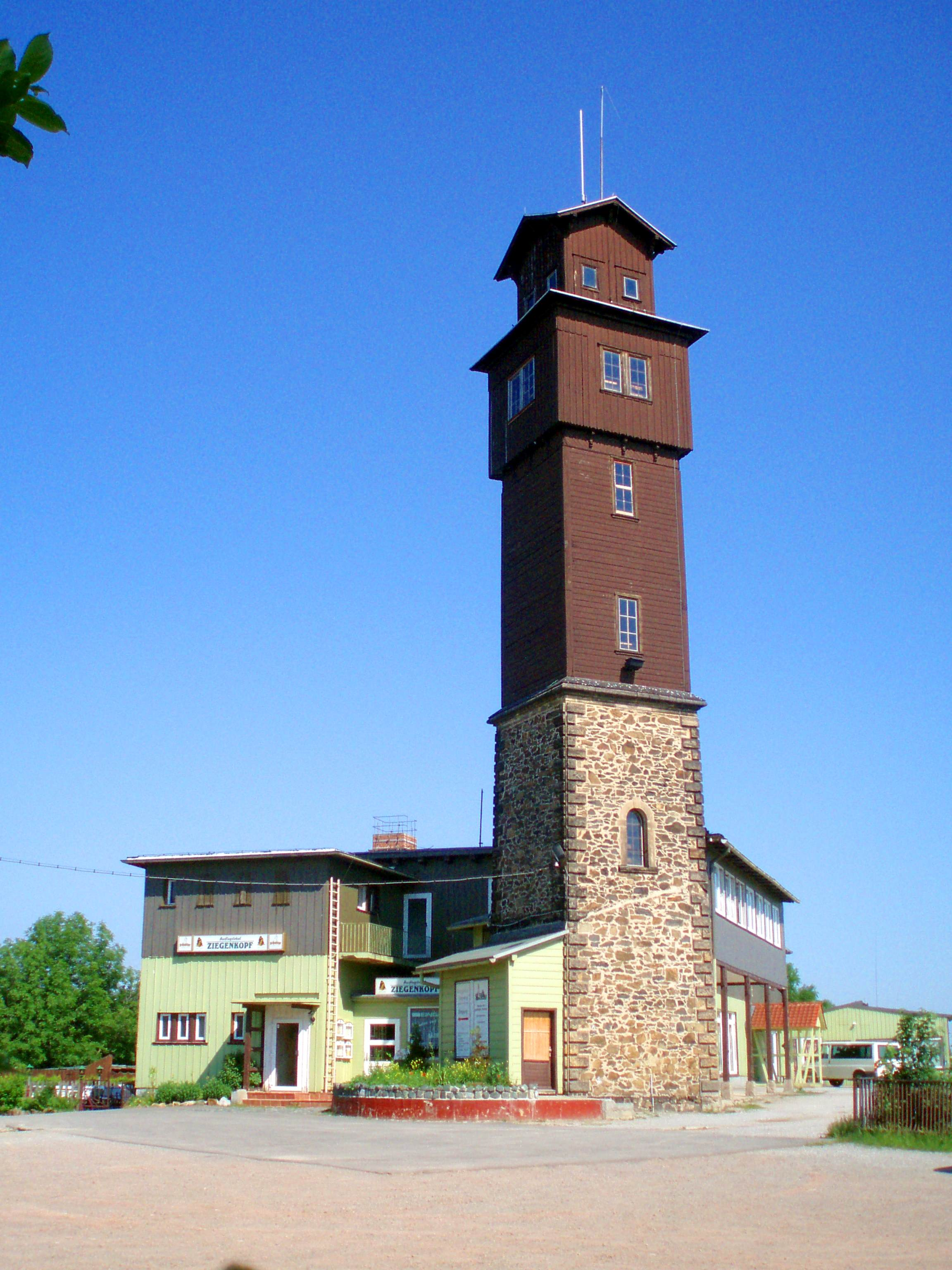
- Observation tower and restaurant on the Ziegenkopf

Highest point
- Elevation: 400.7 m above sea level (NN) (1,315 ft)
- Coordinates: 51°47′18″N 10°56′03″E

Geography
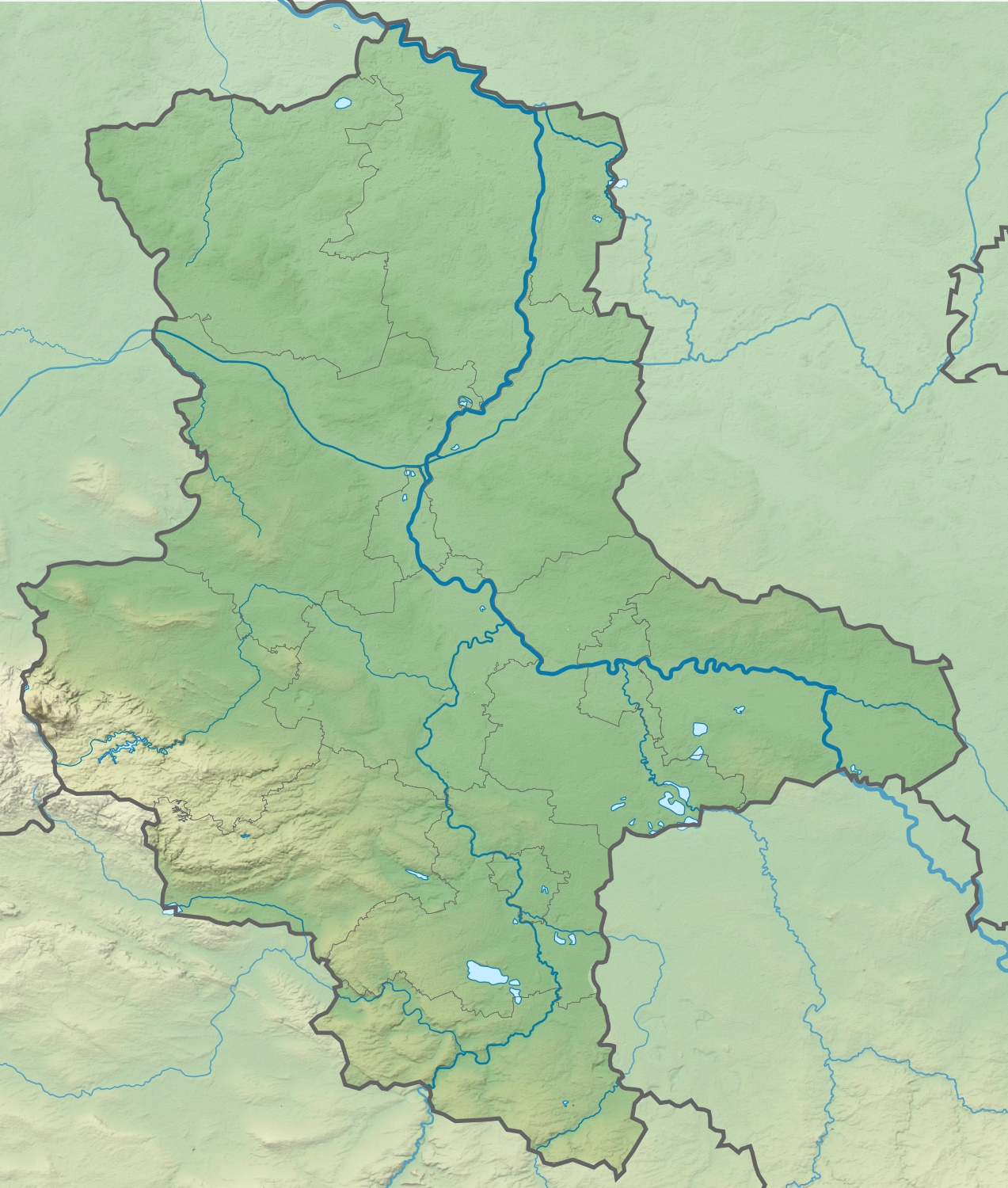
- Location within Saxony-Anhalt
- Location: Saxony-Anhalt, Germany
- Parent range: Harz Mountains

The Ziegenkopf is a hill, 400.7 m above sea level (NN), near Blankenburg in the Harz mountains in the German state of Saxony-Anhalt.

== Geographical location ==
The Ziegenkopf lies just under 1 km (0.62 mi) southwest of Blankenburg and about 200 m south of the B 27 federal highway to Hüttenrode.

== Observation tower ==
Over 100 years ago an observation tower, 30 metres high with a stone base and wooden upper storey, was erected on the summit of the Ziegenkopf, with good views over to the famous Brocken. Next to it is a hilltop restaurant.
