= Renneckenberg =

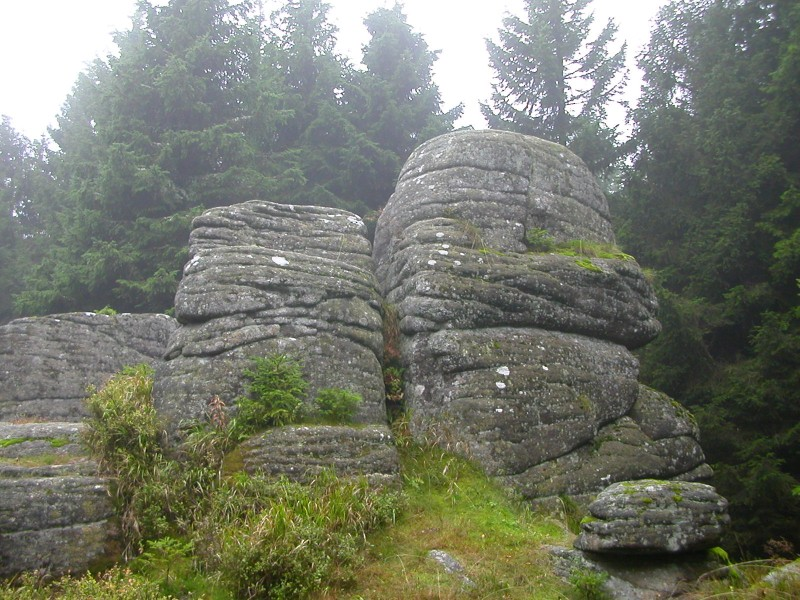
- The Brockenkinder tor on the Renneckenberg

Highest point
- Elevation: 933 m (3,061 ft)
- Coordinates: 51°47′26″N 10°38′59″E

Geography
- Location within Germany
- Location: Germany
- Parent range: Harz

The Renneckenberg (formerly Rennekenberg) is a mountain, roughly 933 metres (3,061 ft) high, in the High Harz part of the Harz mountain range of central Germany within the borough of Wernigerode in the state of Saxony-Anhalt.

== Location ==
The Renneckenberg lies in the Harz/Saxony-Anhalt Nature Park and the Harz National Park just under 3 kilometres north of the village of Schierke in the borough of Wernigerode. Its summit rises about 300 metres east of the Kreisstraße (county road), the K 1356 or Brockenstraße, that runs from Schierke up to the highest mountain in the Harz, the Brocken (1141.1 m). The Renneckenberg runs as a ridge from the Zeterklippen crags (max. ca. 830 m) in the northwest to the Kapellenklippe (ca. 910 m) in the southeast.

Towards the north-northwest the mountainsides of the Renneckenberg descend into the valley of the River Ilse; towards the northeast they lead towards the Hoher Wand (758 m) and the Ohrenklippen crags; and towards the east they drop into the valley Holtemme which rises on the mountain in the area where it transitions to the Hohnekamm (900.6 m, with its Hohneklippen) to the south-southeast. Towards the south the terrain descends into the valley of the Cold Bode and the village of Schierke. To the west-southwest there is a saddle (900.6 m) on the K 1356 which links to the Heinrichshöhe (ca. 1045 m). To the west the countryside runs across to the Brocken via the Brockenbett through which the upper reaches of the Ilse flow.

== Description ==
On the forested Renneckenberg there are many rock formations - apart from the aforementioned Zeterklippen and Kapellenkind - that, apart from the Brockenkinder ("Brocken children", ca. 905 m), are unnamed. West of the summit in the direction of the K 1356 and about 912 metres high is the ski hut of the Wernigerode Ski Club. At the southern end of the Renneckenberg where it transitions to the Brockenbett, the valley between the Heinrichshöhe and the Brocken to the west and the Renneckenberg to the east, on the K 1356, is the Gelber Brink (900.6 m) which is no. 22 in the system of checkpoints in the Harzer Wandernadel hiking scheme.

== Height ==
Whilst the height of the Renneckenberg is usually given as 933 metres above sea level (southern top), the last contour line below the summit on the maps is 930 m. The northern top of the mountain is 929.7 metres above sea level.
