= Neustadt Dam =

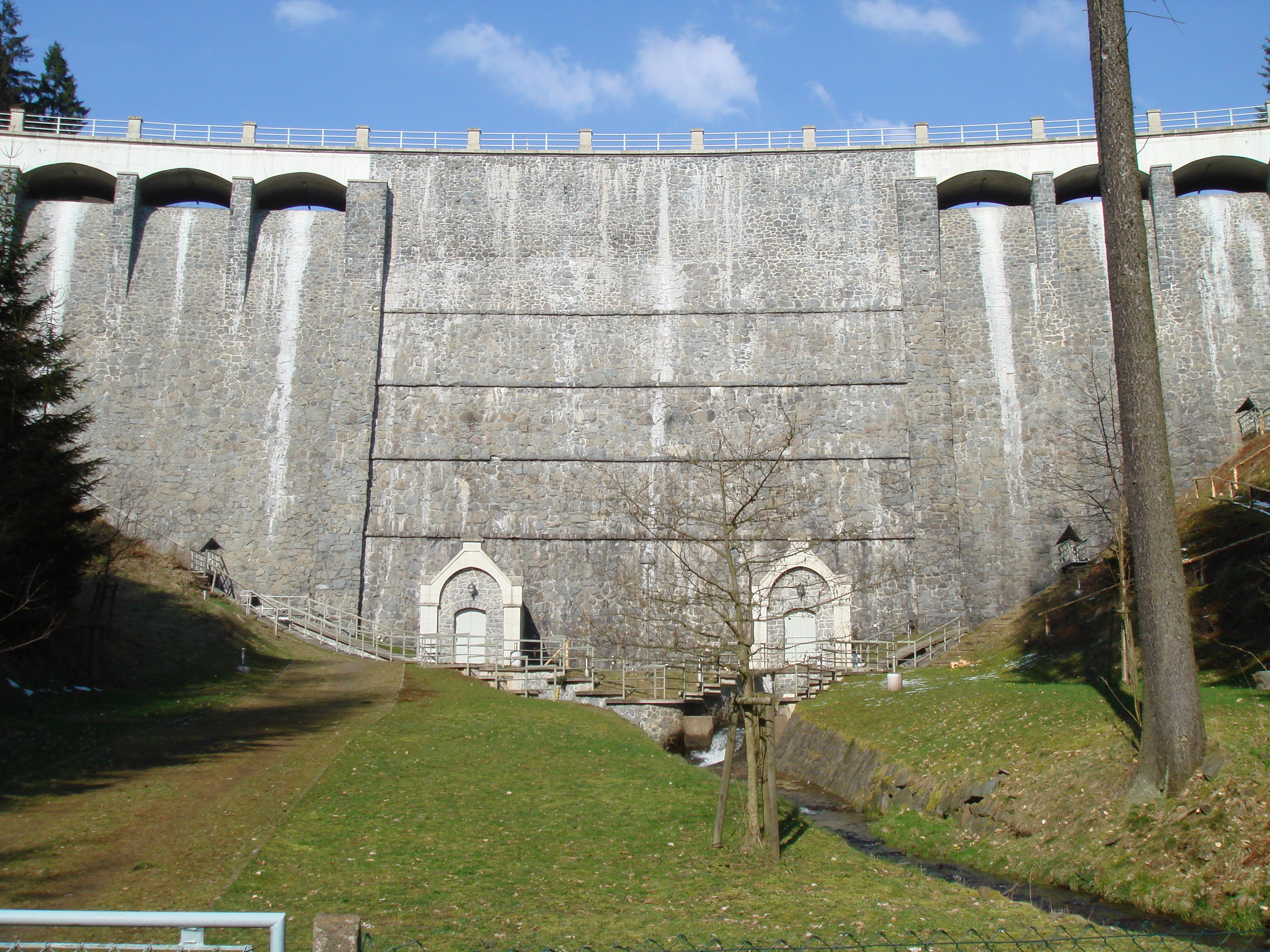

- Location within Germany
- Official name: Talsperre Neustadt
- Coordinates: 51°34′50″N 10°52′2″E
- Construction began: 1904
- Opening date: 1905

Dam and spillways
- Height: 32 m (105 ft)
- Length: 134.6 m (442 ft)
- Width (crest): 4.25 m (13.9 ft)
- Dam volume: 32,000 m^{3} (1,100,000 ft^{3})

Reservoir
- Total capacity: 1,270,000 m^{3} (45,000,000 ft^{3})
- Catchment area: 5.4 km^{2} (2.1 mi^{2})
- Surface area: 136,800 m^{2} (1,473,000 sq ft)

The Neustadt Dam, also known as the Nordhausen Dam (German: Talsperre Neustadt or Nordhäuser Talsperre), is the oldest dam in the Free State of Thuringia in Germany. It supplies drinking water to the town of Nordhausen. The dam is a curved gravity dam made of rubble stone, based on the Intze Principle. The dam was built in 1904–1905, in the southern Harz mountains, and it was raised by a further 6.26 metres in 1922–1923. The impounded stream is the Krebsbach. The operator of the dam is the Thüringer Fernwasserversorgung; the water is supplied to the Wasserverband Nordhausen (Nordhausen Water Association).

Swimming and water sports are not permitted on the lake, but there is a public path around the lakeshore.

The dam was refurbished between 1997 and 2001. It was reinforced, waterproofed on the upstream side with asphaltic concrete, and given an inspection walkway and an impervious blanket.

On the western side of the valley is a checkpoint (no. 218) in the Harzer Wandernadel hiking system.

== See also ==
- List of dams and reservoirs in Germany
- List of dams in the Harz
