= Königsruhe =

Small settlement in the Bode Gorge in the Harz Mountains of Germany

Coordinates: 51.7347°N 11.0214°E

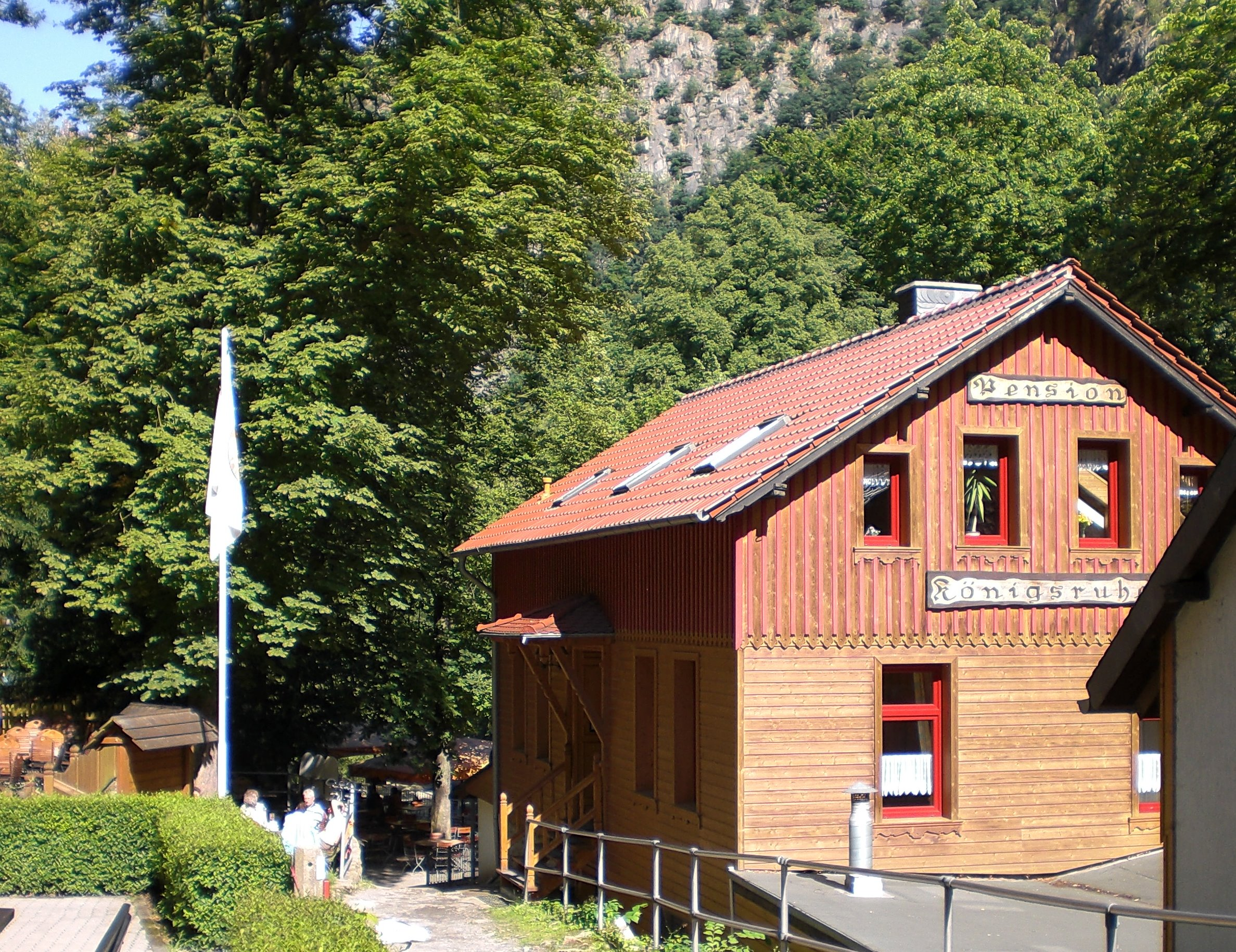
Path through Königsruhe

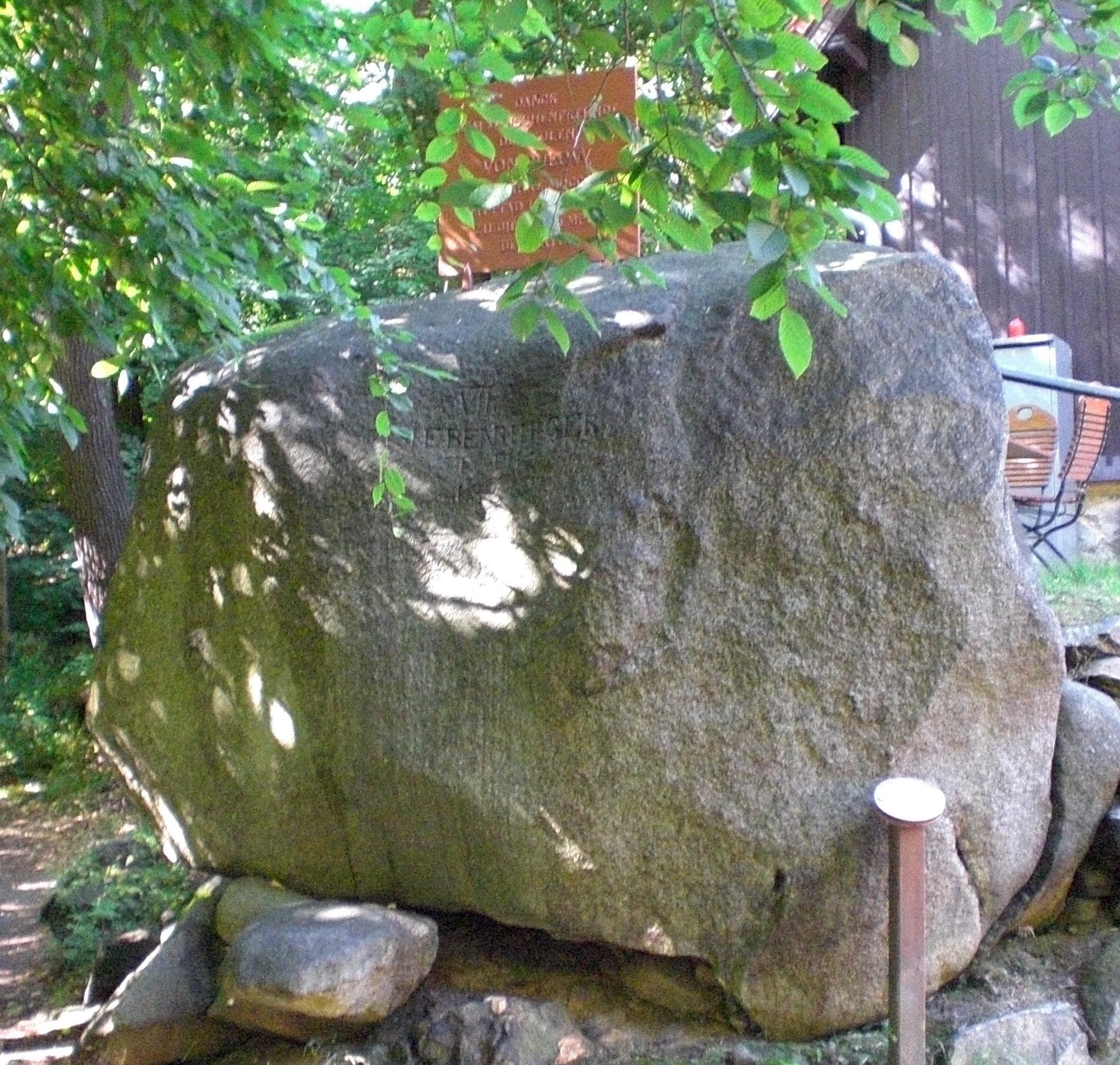
Stone with information about the Siebenbrüder Rocks at the exit for Treseburg

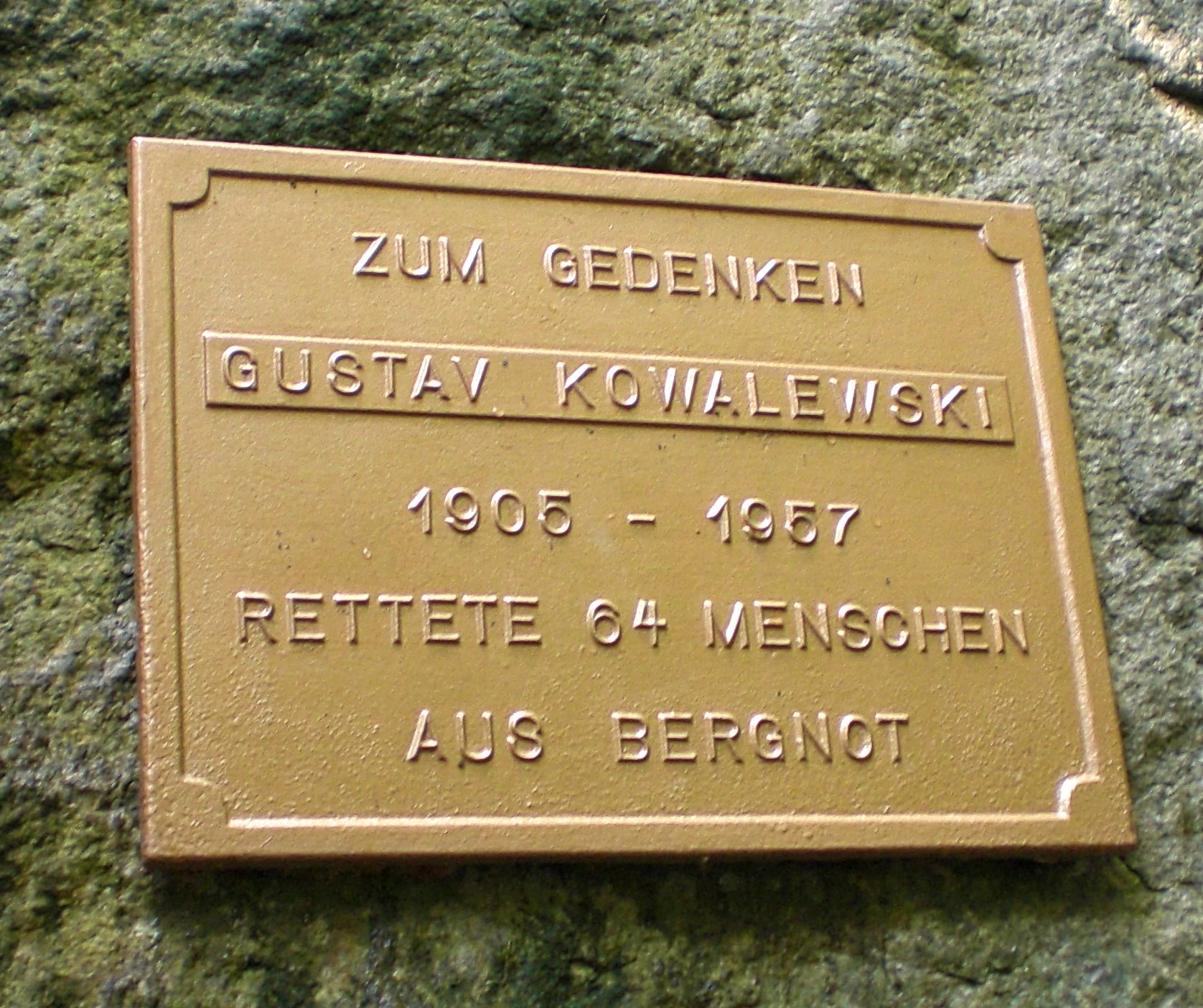
Memorial plaque for Gustav Kowalewski

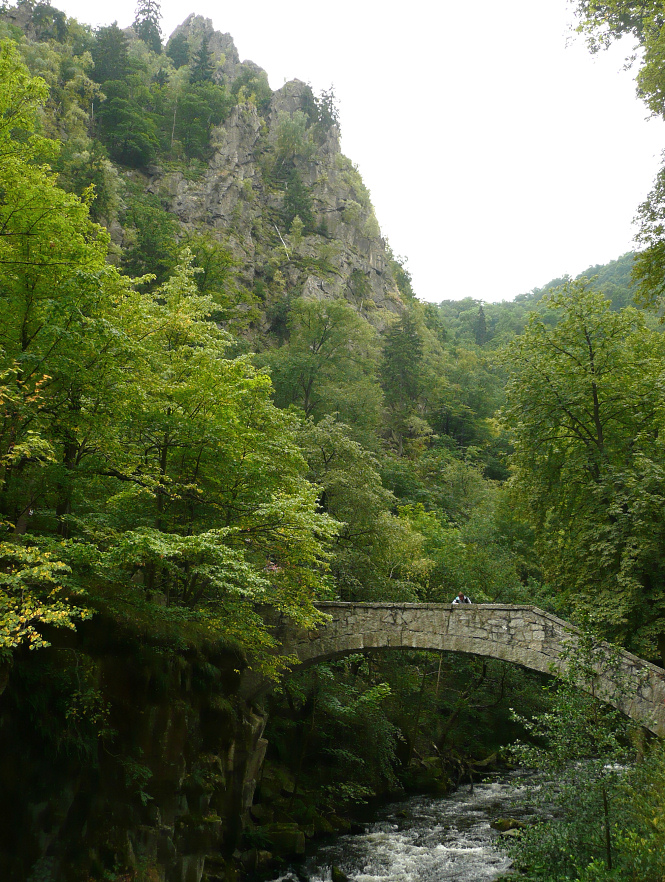
The Jungfern Bridge

Königsruhe (also Gut Königsruhe i.e. Königsruhe Estate) is a small settlement in the Bode Gorge in the Harz Mountains of Germany, south of the town of Thale in Saxony-Anhalt.

== Location ==
Königsruhe lies in the Hirschgrund ("Stag Bottom") immediately next to the River Bode, a mountain river that has cut deeply into the surrounding mountains at this point. The footpath along the gorge from Thale to Treseburg runs through the settlement which lies in the borough of Thale. As far as Königsruhe, the track can be used by motor vehicles from the direction of Thale when required, but is normally closed to traffic. A narrow, stone bridge, the Jungfern Bridge (Jungfernbrücke), crosses the Bode in Königsruhe.

== History ==
In 1834 a shopkeeper, Christian Jung from Thale, built a wooden hut with a fireplace in the Hirschgrund in the Bode Gorge. In 1856 another larger building followed, which was sited next to the bridge over the Bode. Initially it was called Hirschgrund. To commemorate the Prussian king, Frederick William IV, who stayed here on 5 May 1834, the extended inn was called Hotel Königsruhe ("King's Rest") in 1875.

The name Königsruhe remained until the period of the German Democratic Republic when, for political reasons, the place was renamed Hirschgrund. In August 1994 the Bauer family bought the property and, since 1995, it has once again been given the name "Königsruhe".

== Economy ==
Tourism dominates the economy. A restaurant with a beer garden (Hirschgrund 1) is used by numerous hikers walking the nationally known trails across the Harz region. In addition there is guest accommodation. In Königsruhe there is a mountain rescue station owned by the Harz mountain rescue organisation which looks after the path to Thale and also has its own rescue vehicle.

== Places of interest ==
In addition to the impressive nature of the Bode Gorge, local attractions include the Seven Brothers' Rocks (Siebenbrüderfelsen) at the exit of the settlement towards Thale and the Jungfern Bridge (Jungfernbrücke) newly erected at the beginning of the 20th century over the Bode. On the footpath to Thale is a memorial plaque to the mountain rescuer, Gustav Kowalewski.
