= Petersdorf, Thuringia =

Petersdorf
- Village of Nordhausen
- Interactive map of Petersdorf
- Location within Germany Location within Thuringia
- Coordinates: 51°31′N 10°49′E
- Country: Germany
- State: Thuringia
- District: Nordhausen
- Town: Nordhausen

Area
  - Total: 4.03 km^{2} (1.56 sq mi)
- Elevation: 280 m (920 ft)

Population (2006-12-31)
  - Total: 345
  - Density: 85.6/km^{2} (222/sq mi)
- Time zone: UTC+01:00 (CET)
  - Summer (DST): UTC+02:00 (CEST)
- Postal codes: 99735
- Dialling codes: 03631

Petersdorf is a former municipality in the district of Nordhausen, in Thuringia, Germany. Since 1 December 2007, it is part of the town Nordhausen.
