= Bielstein Tunnel =

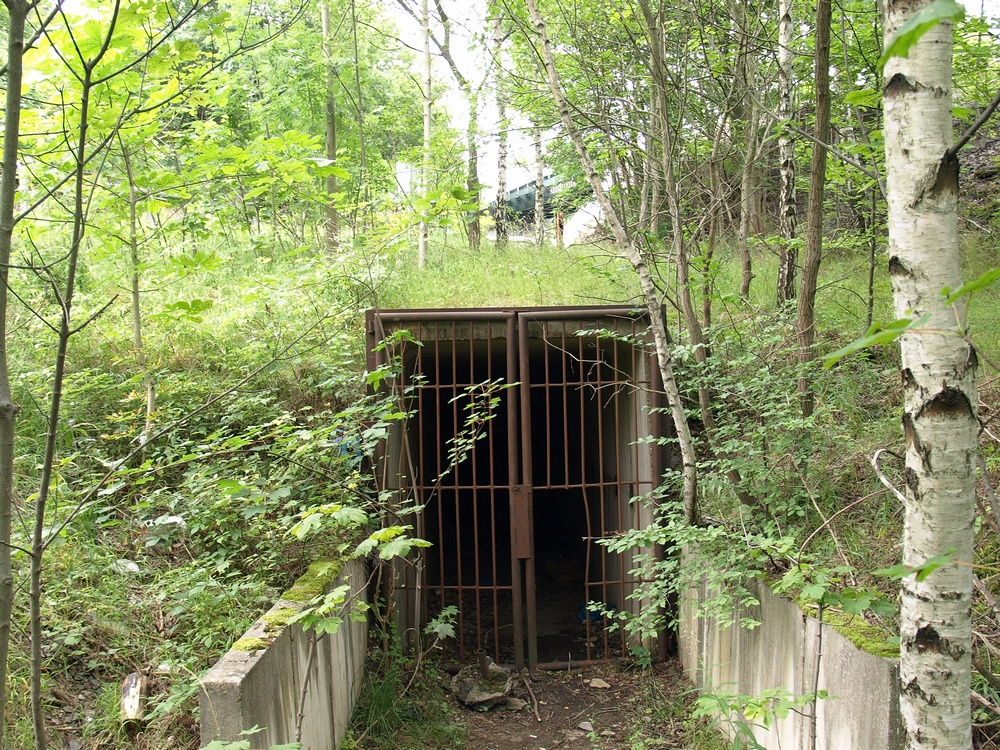
The Bielstein Tunnel

The Bielstein Tunnel (German: Bielsteintunnel) is a disused railway tunnel in Saxony-Anhalt in the Harz Mountains of Central Germany. The tunnel is 465.7 metres long and lies between the zig zag of Michaelstein and Braunesumpf. It belonged to the Erzstufen Railway and, from 1885, to the Harz Railway (today the Rübeland Railway).

During the construction of the Harz Railway the tunnel profile was widened and Braunesumpf station laid out. When the Rübeland Railway was electrified from 1960 to 1965 the tunnel profile had to be widened again. In addition the tunnel was found to be in poor condition so that it was abandoned and the line was relaid further east through a cutting. The tunnel is no longer accessible today.

== Otto Ebert Bridge and Bielsteinsklippe ==
About 100 metres east of the northeastern portal to the Bielstein Tunnel is the Otto Ebert Bridge (Otto-Ebert-Brücke) (402 m above NN; 51°47′6.1″N 10°55′24.3″E), which is a footbridge on the Duke's Way (Herzogsweg) footpath over the Rübeland Railway line. It is no. 79 in the system of checkpoints in the Harzer Wandernadel hiking system.

Some 300 metres southeast of the Otto Ebert Bridge and circa 500 metres southwest of the summit of the Bielstein lie the rocks of the Bielsteinsklippe (at ca. 385 m above NN).
