= Büchenberg Pit =

Iron ore mine in Germany

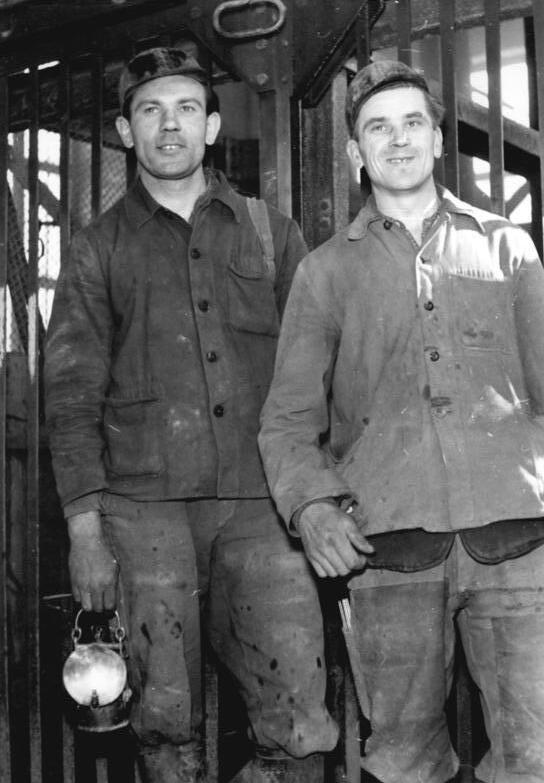
Miners at the Büchenberg Pit in 1954

The Büchenberg Pit (German: Erzgrube Büchenberg) is an old iron ore mine in the Harz Mountains of Germany that is operated today as a show mine. It is located in the village of Büchenberg in the municipality of Oberharz am Brocken in the state of Saxony-Anhalt.

== Hiking ==
The pit is no. 37 in the Harzer Wandernadel network of hiking checkpoints.
