= Hüttenrode =

- Stadtteil of Blankenburg am Harz
- Interactive map of Hüttenrode
- Location within Germany Location within Saxony-Anhalt
- Coordinates: 51°46′N 10°54′E
- Country: Germany
- State: Saxony-Anhalt
- District: Harz
- Town: Blankenburg am Harz

Area
  - Total: 18.63 km^{2} (7.19 sq mi)
- Elevation: 501 m (1,644 ft)

Population (2006-12-31)
  - Total: 1,191
  - Density: 63.93/km^{2} (165.6/sq mi)
- Time zone: UTC+01:00 (CET)
  - Summer (DST): UTC+02:00 (CEST)
- Postal codes: 38889
- Dialling codes: 03944
- Vehicle registration: HZ
- Website: www.blankenburg.de

Hüttenrode is a village and a former municipality in the district of Harz, in Saxony-Anhalt, Germany.

Since 1 January 2010, it is part of the town Blankenburg am Harz.
