= Dammbach (Rappbode) =

River in Germany

Location
- Country: Germany
- States: Saxony-Anhalt; Thuringia

Physical characteristics
- Mouth
  - location: Rappbode
  - coordinates: 51.6815°N 10.7796°E

Basin features
- Progression: Rappbode→ Bode→ Saale→ Elbe→ North Sea

The Dammbach (German pronunciation: [ˈdambax]) is a river in Saxony-Anhalt and Thuringia, Germany. It is a right tributary of the Rappbode in Trautenstein.

== See also ==
- List of rivers of Saxony-Anhalt
- List of rivers of Thuringia
