= Harz (Landkreis Goslar) =

Uninhabited place in Lower Saxony, Germany

- Unincorporated area
- Location of Harz within Goslar district
- Interactive map of Harz
- Location within Germany Location within Lower Saxony
- Coordinates: 51°47′N 10°25′E
- Country: Germany
- State: Lower Saxony
- District: Goslar

Area
  - Total: 371.56 km^{2} (143.46 sq mi)

Population (2025-12-31)
  - Total: 0
  - Density: 0.0/km^{2} (0.0/sq mi)
- Time zone: UTC+01:00 (CET)
  - Summer (DST): UTC+02:00 (CEST)

Harz (German pronunciation: [haːɐ̯ts]) is an unincorporated area in the German district of Goslar.

The uninhabited area is located in the Upper Harz (Lower Saxony). With a size of 371.76 km^{2} (31 December 2006), it is the largest unincorporated area in Germany. Although there are no residents reported, it carries administrative functions; the Community Identification Number is 03 1 53 504. The area extends over large parts of the Upper Harz, from Seesen/Langelsheim in the northwest to Hohegeiß in the south of the district of Goslar. The Harz unincorporated area in the district of Goslar has many enclaves: Thus the community of Clausthal-Zellerfeld has two exclave districts, Wildemann and Altenau-Schulenberg im Oberharz, and the community of Braunlage has an exclave district, Sankt Andreasberg, and other settlements (mostly restaurants) within the Harz area.

The administration of the community-free area is the responsibility of the Lower Saxony Forestry Office Clausthal, which also collects business taxes from some quarries and would issue civil status certificate (birth certificate, death certificate) for events that occurred in the area. The forestry office also provides security and order.
