= Braakberg =

Mountain in Harz, Germany

- Location within Lower Saxony

Highest point
- Elevation: 645.5 m (2,118 ft)
- Prominence: 18.6 m → Auf dem Acker
- Isolation: 0.4 km → Auf dem Acker
- Coordinates: 51°42′42″N 10°22′02″E

Geography
- Location: West and north of Lonau in Göttingen district in Lower Saxony, Germany
- Parent range: Harz Mountains

The Braakberg is a 645.5 metre high mountain in the Harz in central Germany, in the unincorporated area of Harz in the district of Göttingen in the state of Lower Saxony.

== Geography ==
=== Location ===
The Braakberg lies in the South Harz within the Harz National Park about 2.4 km north of Lonau. To the north it transitions into the ridge known as Auf dem Acker. The Braakberg forms the watershed between the streams of Große Steinau to the west and Kleine Lonau to the east.

=== Subpeak ===
The Kargeskopf and the Franzosenkopf are southern foothills of the Braakberg. In a wider sense the ridge running away to the southwest is also known as the Braakberg, especially its southern foothills west of Lonau which have a 512.1 m high sub-peak of the same name.: (Coordinates: 51.6952°N 10.3518°E)

=== Crags and rock formations ===
In the transition zone from the Braakberg to the Haspelkopf (ca. 749 m above NN), a high point in the southwestern area of the Auf dem Acker ridge, around 500 m north-northwest of the summit lie the crags of the Sophienklippe (max. ca. 650 m above NN; 51.7156°N 10.3644°E) and about 700 m northwest is the Spießerklippe (max. ca. 640 m above NN; 51.7142°N 10.3585°E).

== Vegetation ==
The upper slopes of the mountain are covered in spruce, the very lowest with beech trees. It lies entirely within the Harz National Park.

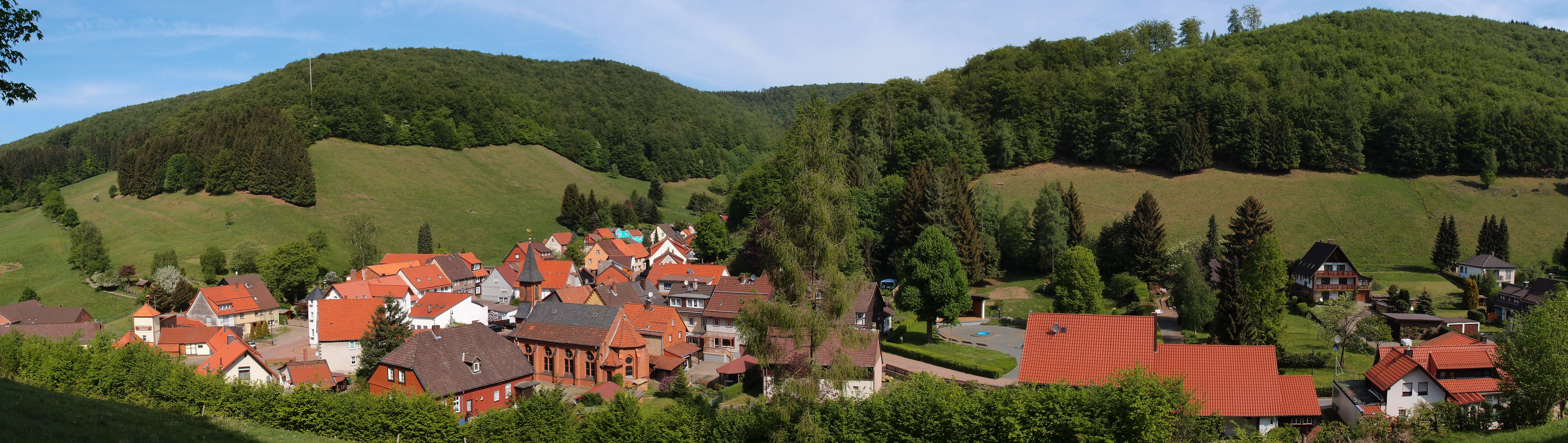
The southwestern, eponymous subpeak (left) of the Braakberg west of the village of Lonau and the Großer Mittelberg (right)

== Sources ==
- Topographische Karte 1:25000, No. 4228 Riefensbeek
- Topographische Karte 1:25000, No. 4328 Bad Lauterberg im Harz
