= Schwarze Kulmke =

River in Germany

Location
- Country: Germany
- States: Lower Saxony

Physical characteristics
- Mouth
  - location: Verlorene Kulmke
  - coordinates: 51°43′24″N 10°26′42″E

Basin features
- Progression: Verlorene Kulmke→ Kleine Kulmke→ Große Kulmke→ Sieber→ Oder→ Rhume→ Leine→ Aller→ Weser→ North Sea

Schwarze Kulmke is a small river of Lower Saxony, Germany. It flows into the Verlorene Kulmke near Herzberg am Harz.

== See also ==
- List of rivers of Lower Saxony
