= Großer Wurzelnberg =

- Location within Lower Saxony

Highest point
- Elevation: 625.8 m (2,053 ft)
- Prominence: 23 m → Auf dem Acker
- Isolation: 0.75 km → Auf dem Acker
- Coordinates: 51°43′43″N 10°27′32″E

Geography
- Location: Northeast of Sieber in Göttingen district in Lower Saxony, Germany
- Parent range: Harz Mountains

The Großer Wurzelnberg rises to a height of 625.8 m above NN in the Harz mountains of central Germany. It lies 3.7 km northeast of Sieber in the district of Göttingen in Lower Saxony. It is a rounded summit (Kuppe) on one of the ridges running southwards from the Acker and which forms the watershed between the Kleine Kulmke and the Große Kulmke. The Kleiner Wurzelnberg is located 750 m further west on the other side of the valley of the Kleine Kulmke.

== Sources ==
- Topographische Karte 1:25000, No. 4228 Riefensbeek
