= Kleiner Wurzelnberg =

- Location within Lower Saxony

Highest point
- Elevation: 610 m (2,000 ft)
- Prominence: 10 m
- Isolation: 0.3 km → Auf dem Acker
- Coordinates: 51°43′44″N 10°26′56″E

Geography
- Location: Northeast of Sieber in Göttingen district in Lower Saxony, Germany
- Parent range: Harz Mountains

The Kleiner Wurzelnberg hill rises to a height of 610 m above NN in the Harz mountains of Germany, 3.7 km northeast of Sieber in the district of Göttingen in Lower Saxony. It forms a rounded summit (Kuppe) on one of the ridges running south of the Acker which acts as the watershed between the Verlorene Kulmke and the Kleine Kulmke. The Großer Wurzelnberg is located 750 metres further east on the other side of the valley of the Kleine Kulmke.

== Sources ==
- Topographische Karte 1:25000, Nr. 4228 Riefensbeek
