= Franzosenkopf (Harz) =

- Location within Lower Saxony

Highest point
- Elevation: 562 m (1,844 ft)
- Prominence: 5 m
- Coordinates: 51°42′08″N 10°22′14″E

Geography
- Location: northeast of Lonau, Göttingen, Lower Saxony, Germany
- Parent range: Harz Mountains

The Franzosenkopf is a 562 metre high hill in the Harz Mountains of central Germany, which lies about 1.4 kilometres northeast of Lonau in the district of Göttingen in Lower Saxony. To the north of the Franzosenkopf is the Braakberg, a shallow saddle separating them. Flowing around the Franzosenkopf to the east and south is the Kleine Lonau in the valley of Mariental ("Mary's Valley"). To the west the Franzosenkopf is separated from the Kargeskopf hill by the Hackenstieltal valley.

The Franzosenkopf is mostly covered in beech, but spruce also occurs in places. It lies entirely within the Harz National Park.

== Sources ==
- Topographic map 1:25,000, No. 4228 Riefensbeek
