= Goldenke =

River in Germany

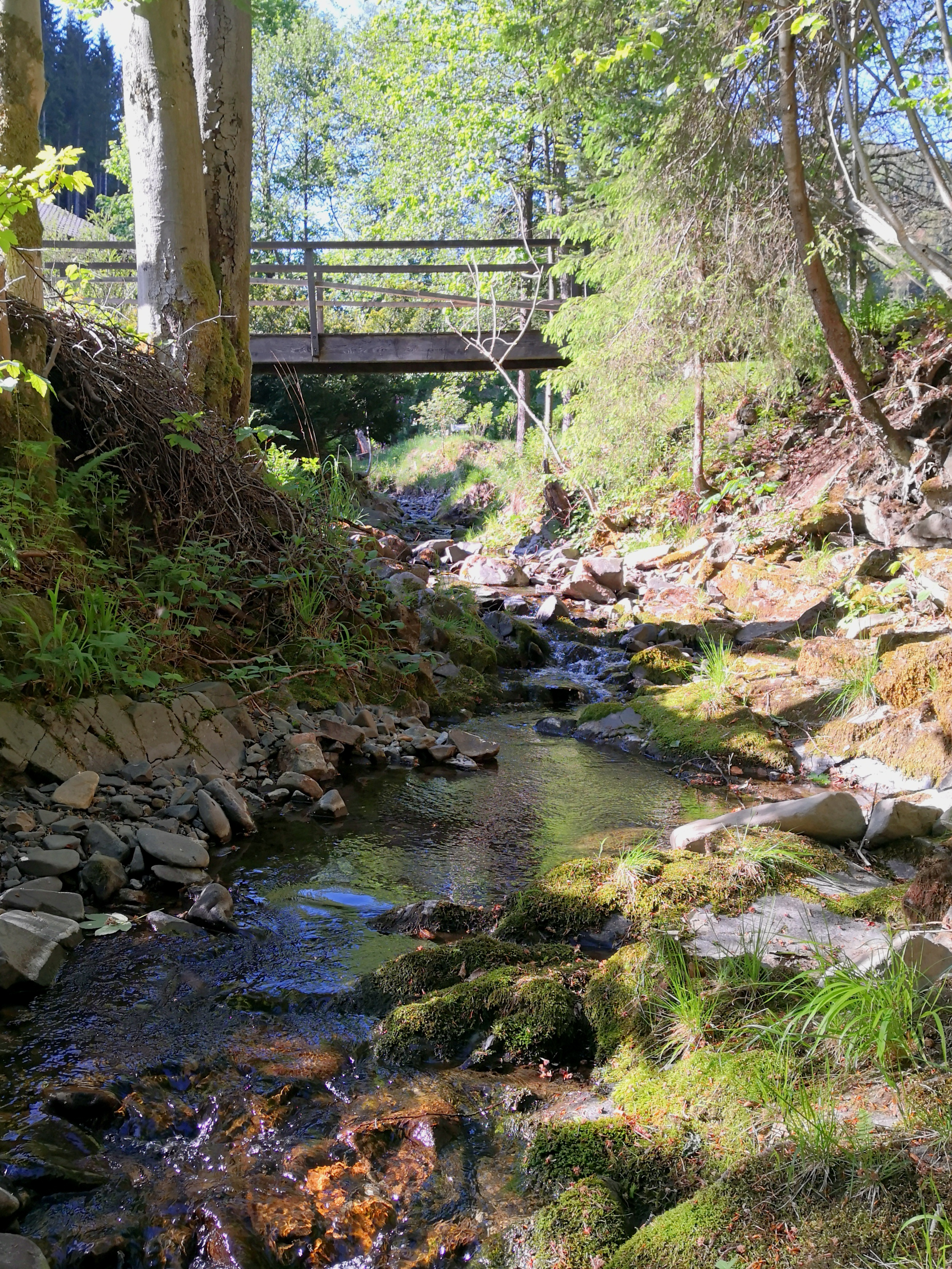
- The Goldenke in Sieber

Location
- Country: Germany
- State: Lower Saxony
- Location: Göttingen district

Physical characteristics
- Source
  - location: By the Goldenkerklippe on the ridge of Auf dem Acker
  - coordinates: 51°43′54″N 10°24′52″E
  - elevation: 800 m above sea level
- Mouth
  - location: into the River Sieber in the village of Sieber
  - coordinates: 51°41′55″N 10°25′41″E
  - elevation: 336 m above sea level
- Length: 4 km (2.5 mi)
- Basin size: 5.9 km^{2} (2.3 sq mi)

Basin features
- Progression: Sieber→ Oder→ Rhume→ Leine→ Aller→ Weser→ North Sea

The Goldenke is a river of Lower Saxony, Germany.

It is a 4 km (2.5 mi) long tributary of the Sieber, north of the village of Sieber in the district of Göttingen. It rises at a height of 800 metres in the vicinity of the Hanskühnenburg on the ridge of Auf dem Acker, by the Goldenkerklippe crags. It then flows mainly in a southerly direction and empties into the River Sieber in the village of the same name.

== See also ==
- List of rivers of Lower Saxony
