= Großer Mittelberg (Lonau) =

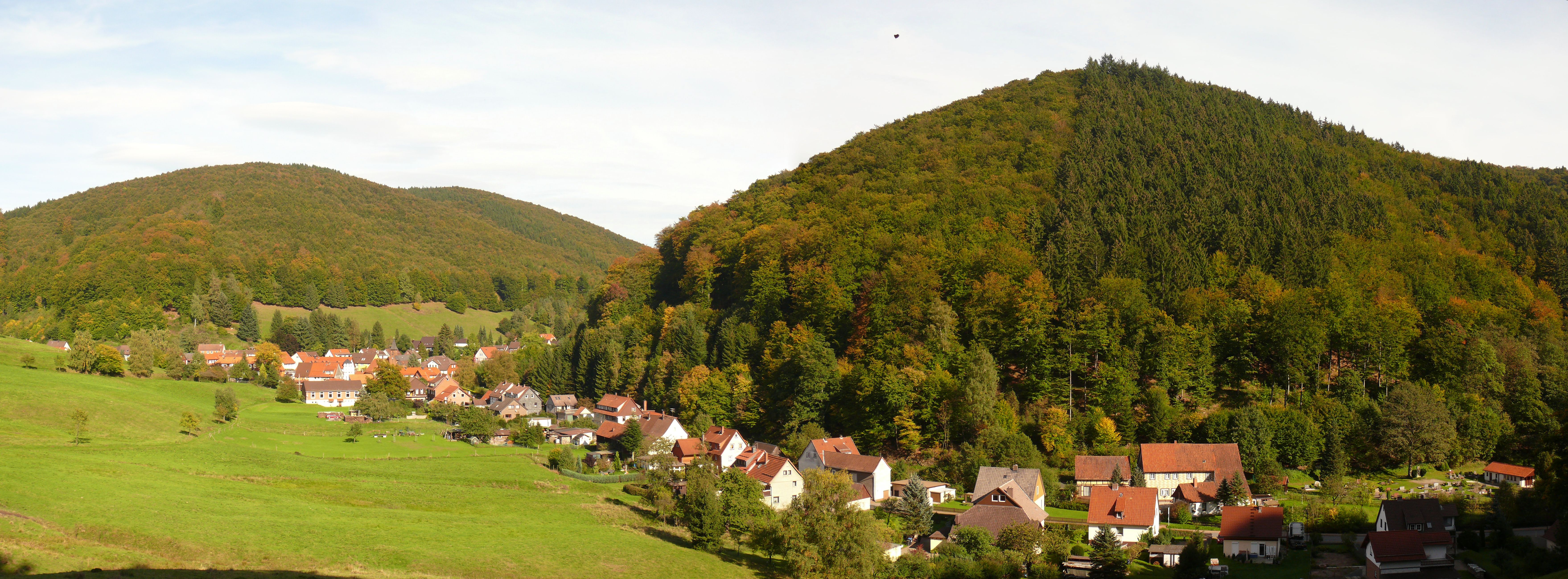
- The Großer Mittelberg (left) in a panoramic view of Lonau

Highest point
- Elevation: 531 m (1,742 ft)
- Coordinates: 51°41′42″N 10°21′54″E

Geography
- Location within Lower Saxony
- Location: northeast of Lonau in the district of Göttingen in Lower Saxony, Germany
- Parent range: Harz

The Großer Mittelberg (the short form Mittelberg is also common) is a ridge in the Harz Mountains of Germany that begins immediately northeast of Lonau in the district of Göttingen in Lower Saxony. It separates the valley of Kirchtal, through which the Große Lonau flows, from the Mariental and the Kleine Lonau. is Although it is the nearest subpeak to the village of Lonau, the Großer Mittelberg is, at 531 metres, not the highest point, but may be viewed as a main summit due to its prominent location. From here on, the ridge only climbs gently in a northeasterly direction and has several more subpeaks with small wind gaps. To the north the Großer Mittelberg transitions to the ridge of Auf dem Acker without any noticeable wind gap.

The Großer Mittelberg is almost entirely covered in beech woods and lies within the Harz National Park.

== Sources ==
- Topographic map 1:25,000 series, No. 4228 Riefensbeek
- Topographic map 1:25,000 series, No. 4328 Bad Lauterberg im Harz
