= Große Lonau =

River in Germany

Location
- Country: Germany
- State: Lower Saxony
- Location: Northeast of Lonau in Göttingen district

Physical characteristics
- Source
  - location: South of the Hanskühnenburg
  - coordinates: 51°43′29″N 10°24′23″E
  - elevation: 730 m
- Mouth
  - location: Sieber
  - coordinates: 51°39′42″N 10°20′50″E
  - elevation: 245 m
- Length: 9.0 km (5.6 mi)
- Basin size: 14 km^{2} (5.4 sq mi)

Basin features
- Progression: Sieber→ Oder→ Rhume→ Leine→ Aller→ Weser→ North Sea
- Tributaries
  - left: Bornwinkel
  - right: Kleine Lonau

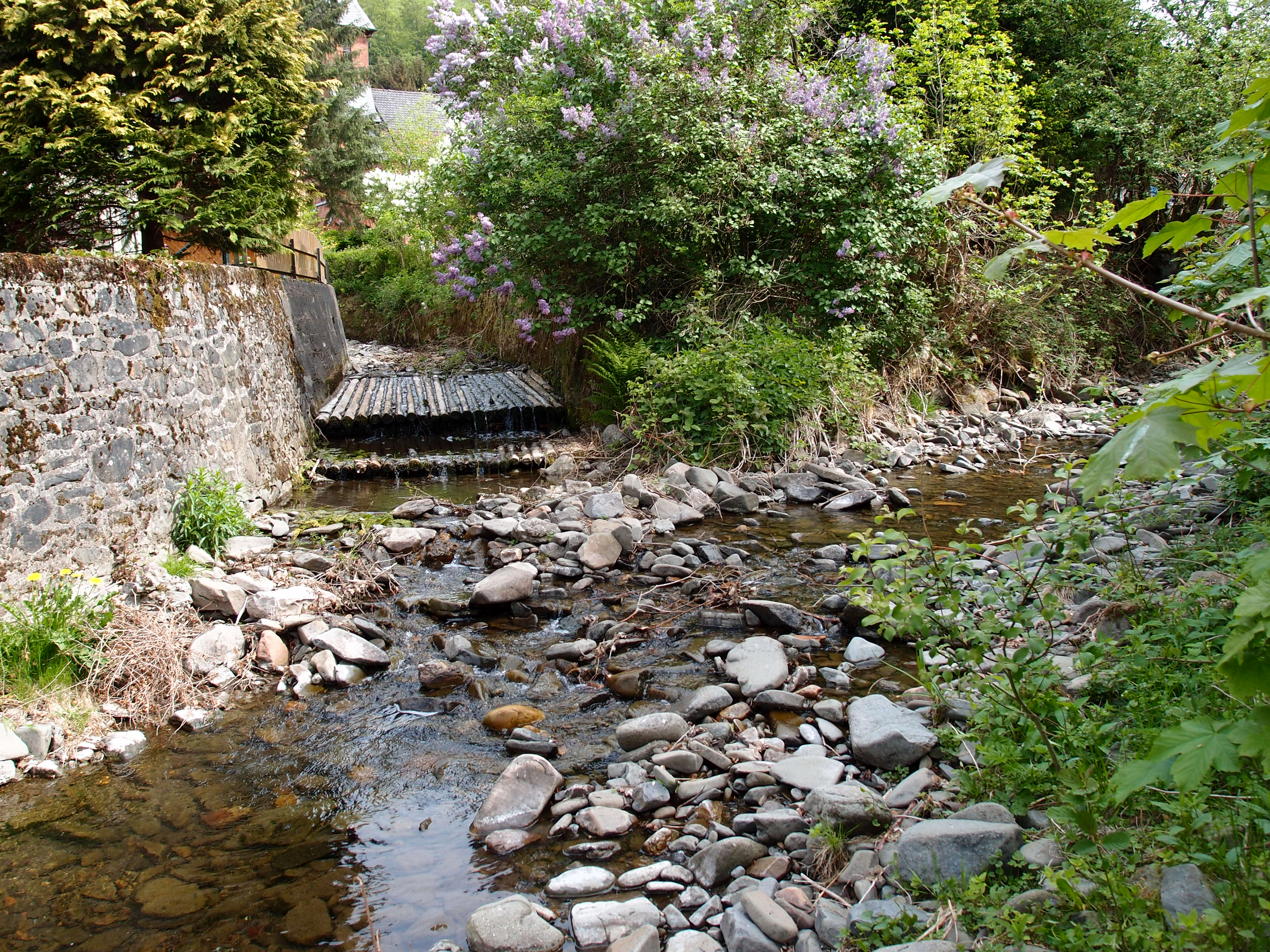
Confluence of the Kleine Lonau and Große Lonau forming the Lonau river

Große Lonau is a river in Lower Saxony, Germany.

== Course ==
The Große Lonau rises at an elevation of 730 m in the vicinity of the Hanskühnenburg on the ridge of Auf dem Acker. Then it flows mostly in a south-southwest direction to Lonau, where it merges with the Kleine Lonau. The Große Lonau discharges into the Sieber in Herzberg am Harz.

== See also ==
- List of rivers of Lower Saxony
