= Mittelberg (disambiguation) =

Mittelberg is a municipality in the district of Bregenz, Vorarlberg, Austria.

Mittelberg may also refer to:

- Mittelberg (Rhön), a mountain of Germany
- Mittelberg (Thuringian Highland), a mountain of Germany

== See also ==
- Großer Mittelberg (disambiguation), multiple hills and mountains of Germany
- Oy-Mittelberg, a municipality in Oberallgäu, Bavaria, Germany
