= Verlorene Kulmke =

River in Germany

Location
- Country: Germany
- State: Lower Saxony

Physical characteristics
- Mouth
  - location: Kleine Kulmke
  - coordinates: 51°43′07″N 10°27′14″E

Basin features
- Progression: Kleine Kulmke→ Große Kulmke→ Sieber→ Oder→ Rhume→ Leine→ Aller→ Weser→ North Sea

Verlorene Kulmke is a small river of Lower Saxony, Germany. It flows into the Kleine Kulmke west of Sankt Andreasberg.

== See also ==
- List of rivers of Lower Saxony
