= Große Steinau =

River in Germany

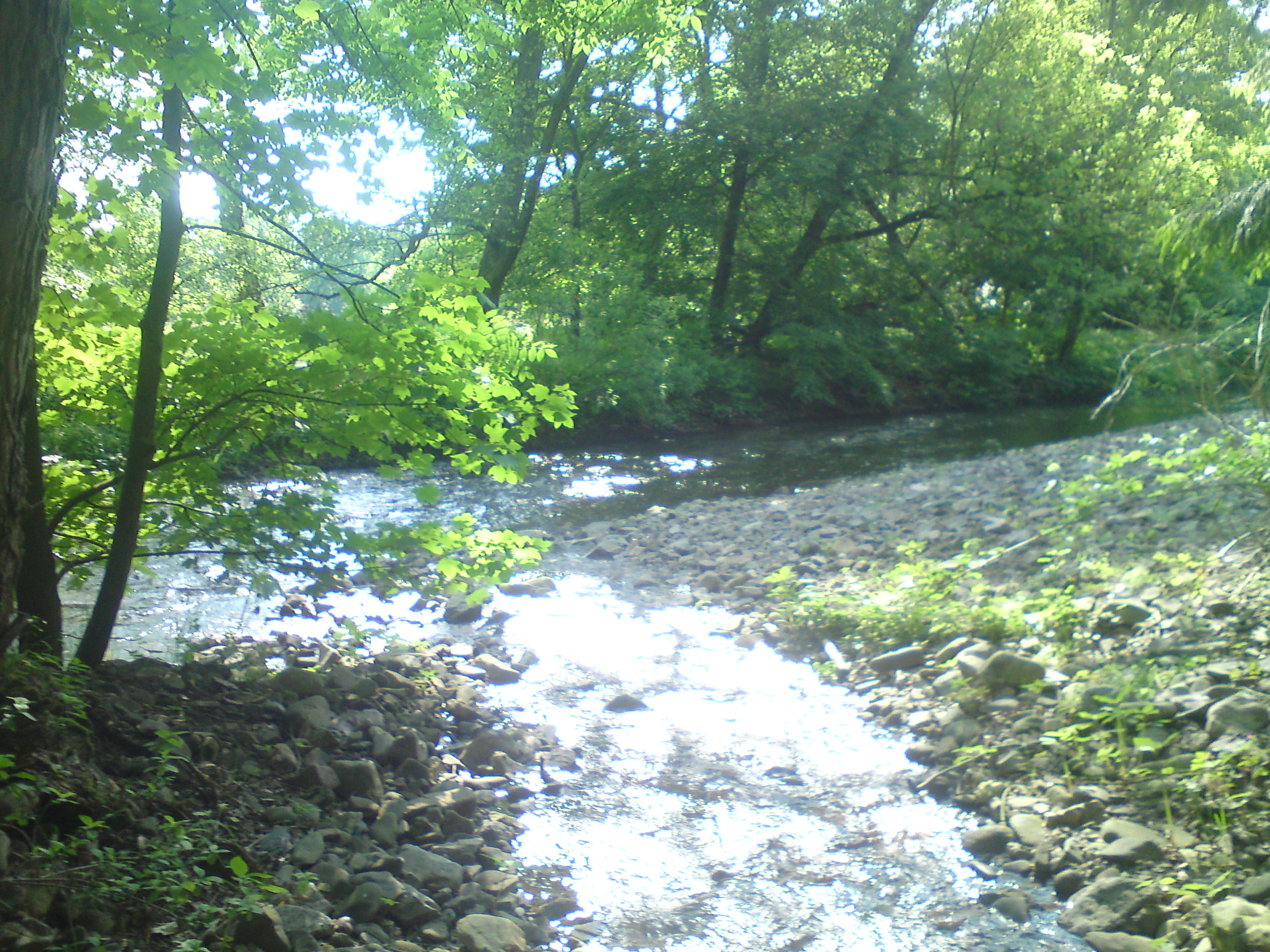
- Confluence of the Große Steinau (foreground) and the Sieber

Location
- Country: Germany
- State: Lower Saxony
- Location: Göttingen district

Physical characteristics
- Source
  - location: Near the Sophienklippe on the Acker
  - coordinates: 51°43′01″N 10°22′06″E
  - elevation: 690 m above sea level
- Mouth
  - location: South of Aschenhütte into the Sieber
  - coordinates: 51°40′17″N 10°18′44″E
  - elevation: 216 m above sea level
- Length: 7.8 km (4.8 mi)

Basin features
- Progression: Sieber→ Oder→ Rhume→ Leine→ Aller→ Weser→ North Sea

The Große Steinau is a river of Lower Saxony, Germany.

It is a 7.8-kilometre-long (4.8 mi) tributary of the Sieber, north of Herzberg am Harz in the district of Göttingen. It rises at about 690 metres near the crags of the Sophienklippe on the Acker. It initially flows in a southwesterly direction, but later swings south before discharging into the Sieber near the small settlement of Aschenhütte, not far from the mouth of the Kleine Steinau. In times of drought the water of the Große Steinau seeps completely into the karst ground before its mouth and reappears about 4 days later at the Rhume Spring. An abandoned village, Steynowe, was probably located in the lower valley of the Große Steinau, but its exact location has not been found.

== See also ==
- List of rivers of Lower Saxony

== Sources ==
- Topographische Karte 1:25000, Nr. 4228 Riefensbeek
- Topographische Karte 1:25000, Nr. 4328 Bad Lauterberg im Harz
- Topographische Karte 1:25000, Nr. 4327 Gieboldehausen
