= Kleine Kulmke =

River in Germany

Location
- Country: Germany
- State: Lower Saxony
- Location: northeast of Sieber in Göttingen district

Physical characteristics
- Source
  - elevation: 690 m
- Mouth
  - location: Große Kulmke
  - coordinates: 51°42′40″N 10°27′47″E
  - elevation: 392 m
- Length: 3.4 km (2.1 mi)
- Basin size: ca. 6 km^{2} (2.3 sq mi)

Basin features
- Progression: Große Kulmke→ Sieber→ Oder→ Rhume→ Leine→ Aller→ Weser→ North Sea
- Tributaries
  - left: Verlorene Kulmke

Kleine Kulmke is river of Lower Saxony, Germany, in the Harz Mountains, a tributary of the Große Kulmke.

The Kleine Kulmke rises at a height of 690 m near the Schmierplatz on the Auf dem Acker ridge north-northeast of Sieber in the district of Göttingen and flows initially southwards to its confluence with the Verlorene Kulmke ("Lost Kulmke", 428 m), from which it is separated by the Kleiner Wurzelnberg hill. It then flows in a southwest to south-southwest direction before uniting with the Große Kulmke ("Big Kulmke") after 3.4 km (2.1 mi) at a height of 392 m. The valley of the Kleine Kulmke partly belongs to the Sieber Valley (Siebertal) nature reserve.

== See also ==
- List of rivers of Lower Saxony

== Sources ==
- Topographische Karte 1:25000, No. 4228 Riefensbeek
