= Großer Mittelberg =

Großer Mittelberg may refer to the following hills and mountains in Germany:

- Großer Mittelberg (Ellrich) (400.1 m), in the Harz near Ellrich, Nordhausen county, Thuringia
- Großer Mittelberg (Haselbach) (633.7 m), in the Thuringian Slate Mountains near Haselbach, Sonneberg county, Thuringia
- Großer Mittelberg (Lonau) (531.0 m), in the Harz near Lonau, Osterode am Harz county, Lower Saxony
- Großer Mittelberg (Mengersgereuth-Hämmern) (687.5 m), in the Thuringian Slate Mountains near Hämmern, Sonneberg county, Thuringia
- Großer Mittelberg (Theuern) (ca. 805 m), in the Thuringian Slate Mountains near Theuern, Sonneberg county, Thuringia
- Großer Mittelberg (Steinach) (649.2 m), in the Thuringian Slate Mountains near Steinach, Sonneberg county, Thuringia
