= Lonau =

Coordinates: 51°41′31″N 10°21′31″E

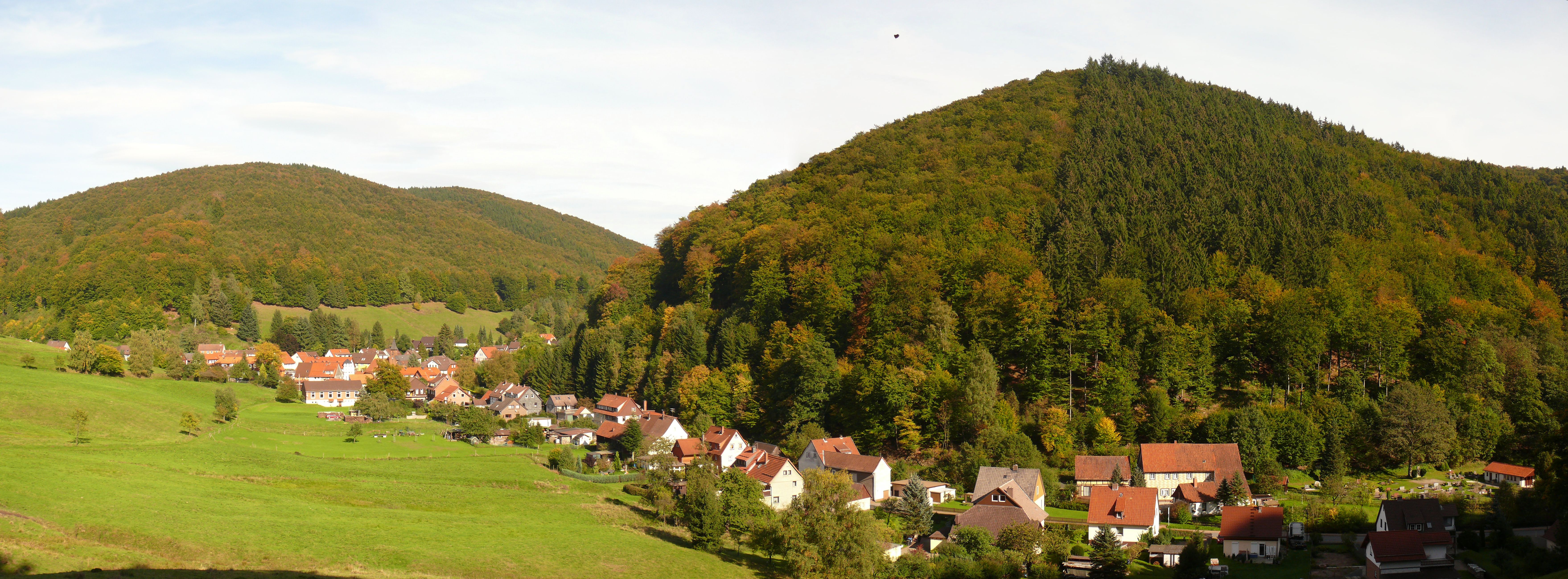

Lonau is a small village with a population of about 345 situated at an elevation of about 400m in the Harz Mountains of Northern Germany. Besides the clean air and lush forests, it is famous for the capercaillie. It belongs to the city of Herzberg am Harz which is about 4 km to the south. The rivers Große Lonau and Kleine Lonau join here.

== History ==
The village of Lonau goes back to a settlement that was established here as a consequence of the setting up of iron ore mines and iron smelting huts at the beginning of the 16th century.

Lonau was first mentioned in the records in ducal tax documents from 1615, although a smithy in Lonau had been named in 1525.

== Geography ==
Lonau lies in the South Harz, in the middle of the Harz National Park at a height of 355 to 430 m above sea level and has 350 inhabitants (as at 1 January 2011).

The village is divided into three areas: Unterdorf, Kirchtal and Mariental. The Church of St. Michael is roughly in the centre of the village at the junction of all three districts. The Kleine Lonau stream flows through Mariental and the Große Lonau through Kirchtal. After merging in the village centre the river Große Lonau flows down to Herzberg.

Surrounding hills include the Heuer to the southwest, the Braakberg to the west and north, the Kargeskopf to the north, the Franzosenkopf and the Großer Mittelberg to the northeast, the Langfast to the east, the Hirtenberg to the southeast and the Großer Teichtalskopf to the south.

== Tourism and sights ==
Lonau is mainly visited in summer by holiday walkers and in winter by cross country skiers. The main sights in and around Lonau are the capercaillie enclosure (Auerhahngehege), the mountain inn of Hanskühnenburg, the surrounding beech woods, the parish church and the Lonau Waterfall, which is actually in Herzberg. For holidaymakers there are several restaurants, a campsite, the spa park, a lido and a minigolf course. At least five checkpoints in the Harzer Wandernadel system are easily reached on foot from Lonau: Kastanienplatz (no. 149), Köte am Schindelkopf (no. 143), Hanskühnenburg (no. 144), Waidmannsruhe (no. 148) and the Großer Knollen (no. 150).
