= Bruchberg =

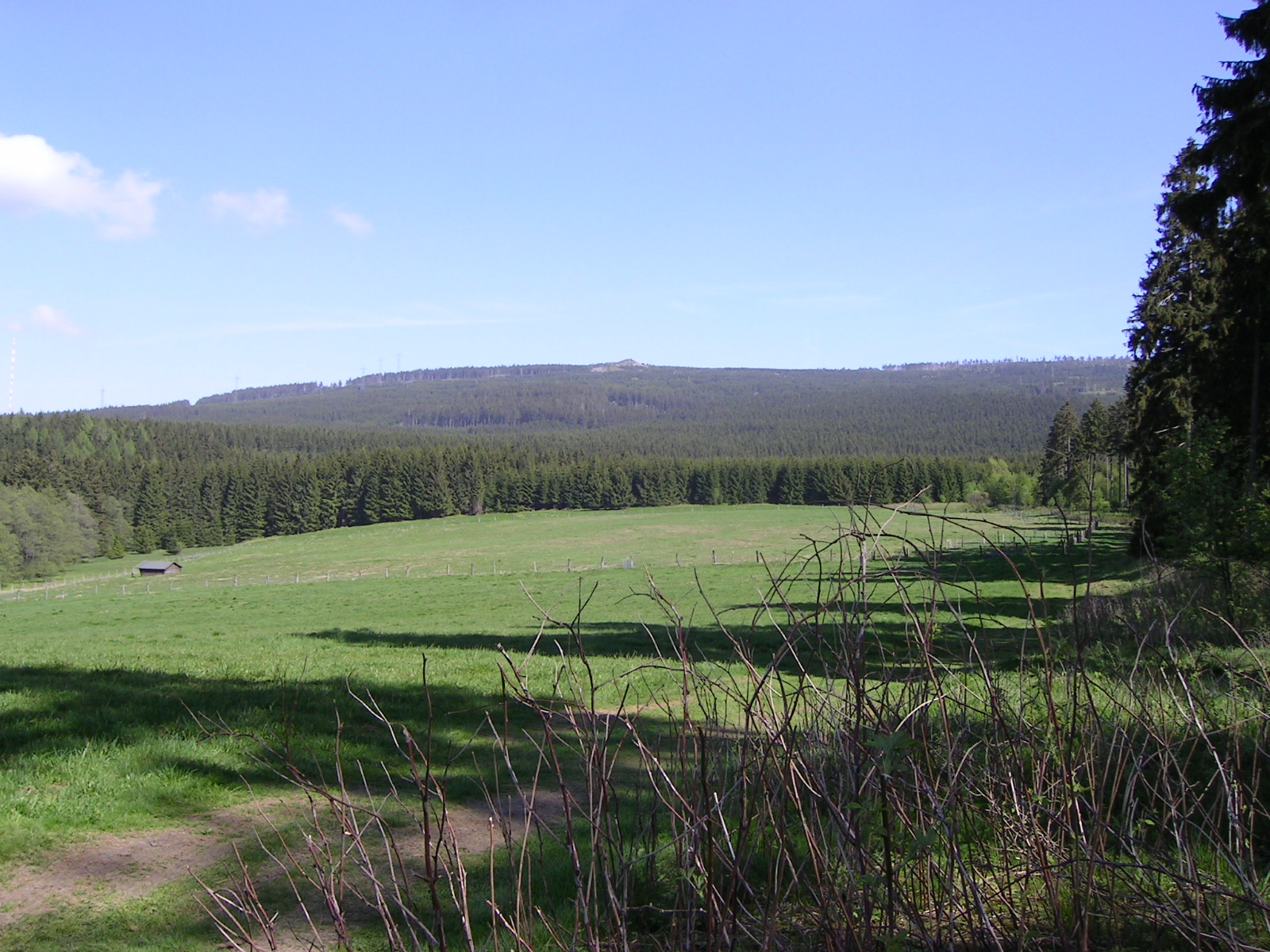
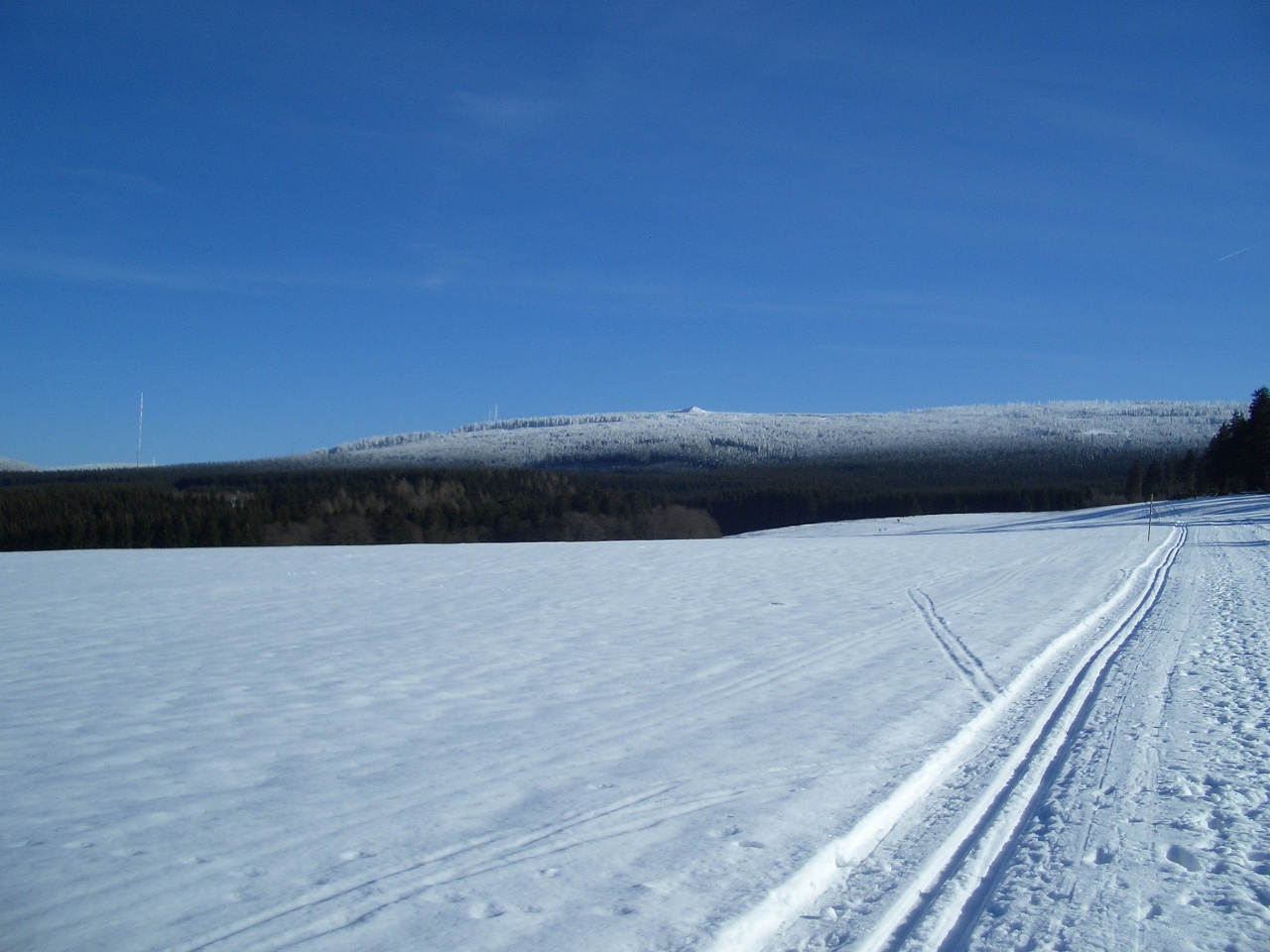
- View of the Bruchberg roughly from the direction of Altenau with the Wolfswarte (centre) and summit region (right) in summer … … and in winter with the Torfhaus Transmitter in the background

Highest point
- Elevation: 927 m above sea level (NHN) (3,041 ft)
- Prominence: 145 m
- Isolation: 6.3 km → Brocken
- Coordinates: 51°47′01″N 10°30′00″E

Geography
- Location within Lower Saxony
- Location: near Altenau; Goslar, Lower Saxony (Germany)
- Parent range: Harz (Upper Harz)

Geology
- Rock type: Acker-Bruchberg quartzite

At 927 m above sea level (NN), the Bruchberg in the Upper Harz is the second highest mountain in Lower Saxony and the third highest in the Harz mountains in North Germany. It lies between Altenau and Torfhaus in the middle of the Harz National Park. The Bruchberg is more like a plateau and has no real summit. This plateau is partly covered with trees, but on the sunny southern slopes the trees have largely died as a result of bark beetle infestation (see photograph below). Following this insect destruction, a new natural forest, rich in its variety of species, is now growing in the heart of the Harz National Park.

== Geography ==
The Wolfswarte, at 918 m above NN, is generally considered as the summit, even if it is not the highest elevation on the Bruchberg. It is a domed hilltop (Kuppe) made of weathered Acker-Bruchberg quartzite. The Wolfswarte rises east of the mountain town of Altenau and, in good visibility, the Brocken can be seen from here. The bald summit of the Wolfswarte is easily visible from other peaks in the area, notably the Glockenberg in Altenau, the Schulenberg and also from the Torfhaus.

To the southwest the heights of the Bruchberg are continued by the Acker Ridge with its mountain hut, the Hanskühnenburg.

== Ascent ==
From Altenau the Wolfswarte Way (Wolfswarter Weg; its upper section is also known as the Upper Bruchberg Way or Oberer Bruchbergweg) runs past Okerstein in a fairly straight line up to the Wolfswarte. This track is linked by several lateral tracks to the Steile Wand road (Steile-Wand-Straße) from Altenau to Torfhaus. The easiest way to get to the Wolfswarte is to take the last lateral track at a height of about 760 m, shortly before the first carpark on the Steile Wand road and then to branch off after a few hundred metres onto the rather rough track, the Butterstieg, which is not suitable for cyclists. From Torfhaus there is a longer, but more direct route to the Wolfswarte which is about 4 km long. This is also not very suitable for bicycles.

== Walking ==
Since 2007 the Wolfswarte has been a checkpoint on the Harz Walking Route (Harzer Wandernadel). The checkpoint is not on the summit, but about 200 metres down the hill to the southwest on the Wolfswarte Weg.

== Gallery ==
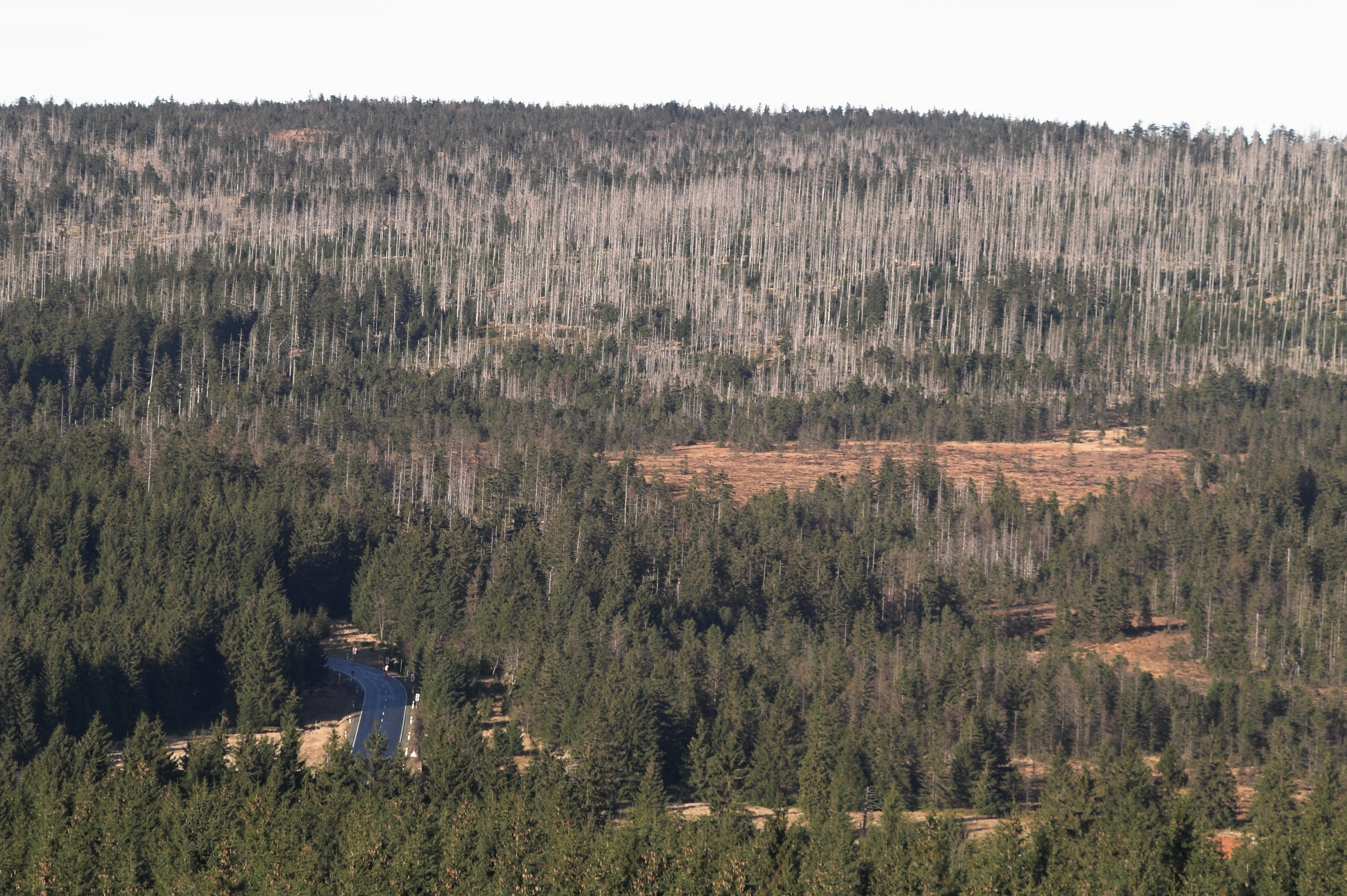
Southern side seen from the Großer Sonnenberg. In the foreground is the B 242 federal highway.

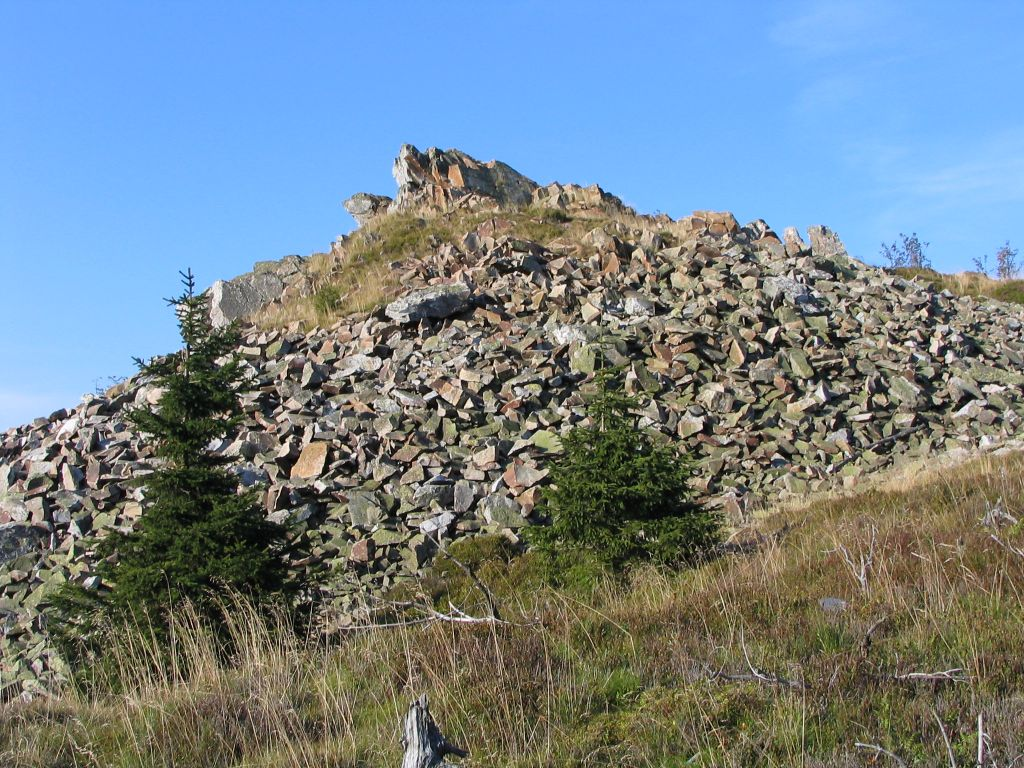
The Wolfswarte

== See also ==
- List of mountains and hills in Lower Saxony
- List of mountains in the Harz
