= Große Kulmke =

River in Germany

Location
- Country: Germany
- State: Lower Saxony
- District: Göttingen

Physical characteristics
- Source
  - location: near the Auf dem Acker ridge
  - coordinates: 51°44′49″N 10°27′11″E
  - elevation: 760 m
- Mouth
  - location: Sieber
  - coordinates: 51°42′04″N 10°26′33″E
  - elevation: 355 m
- Length: 6.0 km (3.7 mi)
- Basin size: 15 km^{2} (5.8 sq mi)

Basin features
- Progression: Sieber→ Oder→ Rhume→ Leine→ Aller→ Weser→ North Sea
- Tributaries
  - left: Bornkappe
  - right: Hirschkappe, Bienenkappe, Kleine Kulmke

Große Kulmke is a river of Lower Saxony, Germany.

The Große Kulmke is a tributary of the Sieber in central Germany. It rises near the natural monument of Mönchskappenklippe near the ridge of Auf dem Acker, north-northeast of Sieber in the district of Göttingen in Lower Saxony. It then flows mainly in a southerly direction, separated from the Sieber by the Königsberg. After 5 km (3.1 mi) it merges with the Kleine Kulmke at an elevation of 392 m (1,286 ft). The valley of the Große Kulmke is part of the Sieber Valley (Siebertal) nature reserve.

== See also ==
- List of rivers of Lower Saxony

== Sources ==
- Topographische Karte 1:25000, No. 4228 Riefensbeek
