= Kleine Lonau =

River in Germany

Location
- Country: Germany
- State: Lower Saxony
- Location: North-northeast of Lonau in Göttingen district

Physical characteristics
- Source
  - elevation: 650 m
- Mouth
  - location: Große Lonau
  - coordinates: 51°41′24″N 10°21′32″E
  - elevation: 339 m
- Length: ca. 4.2 km (2.6 mi)
- Basin size: 4.2 km^{2} (1.6 sq mi)

Basin features
- Progression: Große Lonau→ Sieber→ Oder→ Rhume→ Leine→ Aller→ Weser→ North Sea

Kleine Lonau is a tributary of the Große Lonau in Lower Saxony, Germany.

It rises at a height of 650 metres and flows through the Mariental valley to Lonau, where it merges with the Große Lonau. It is about 4.2 km (2.6 mi) long.

== See also ==
- List of rivers of Lower Saxony
