= Hanskühnenburg =

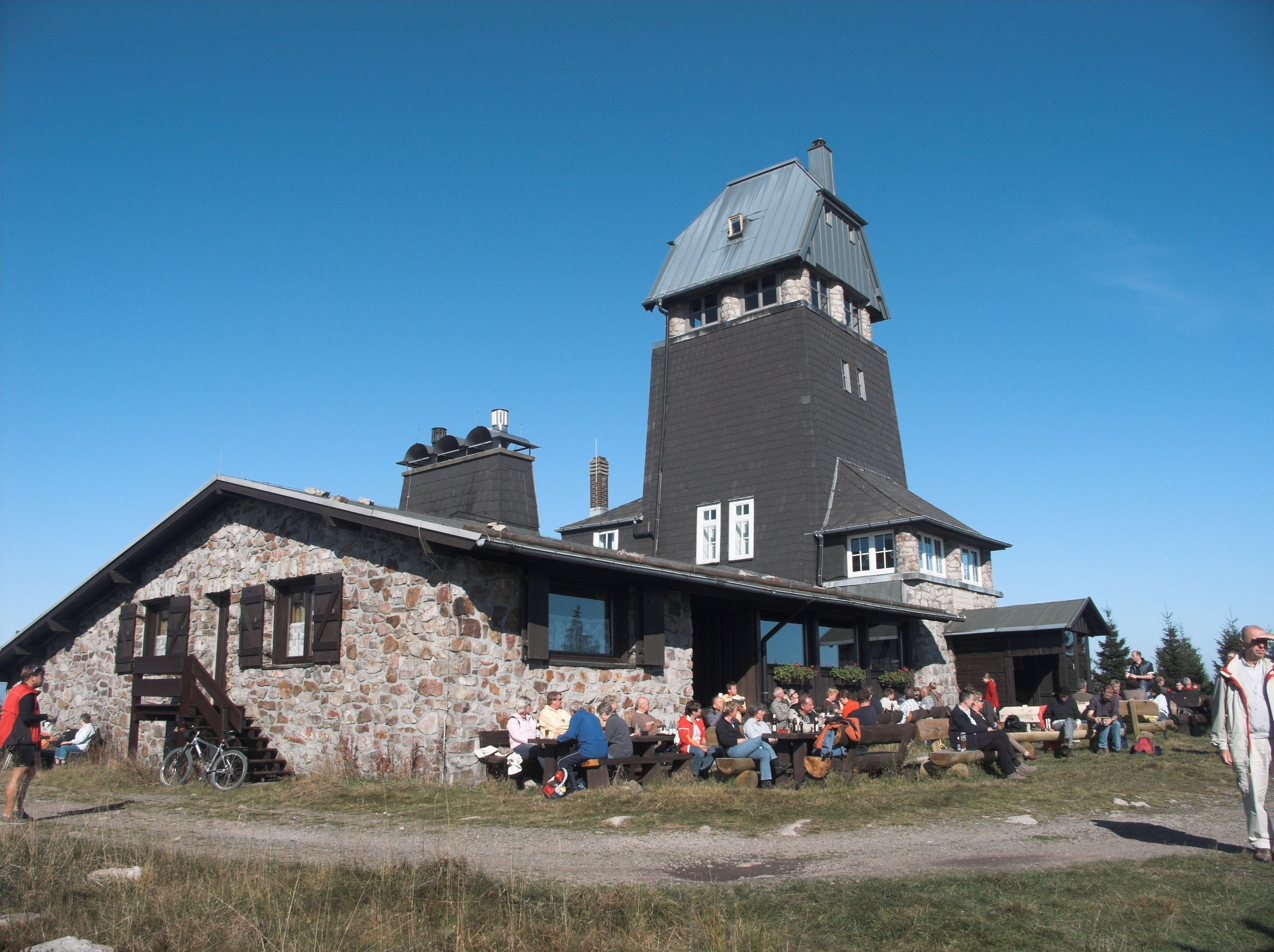
Mountain hut and tower

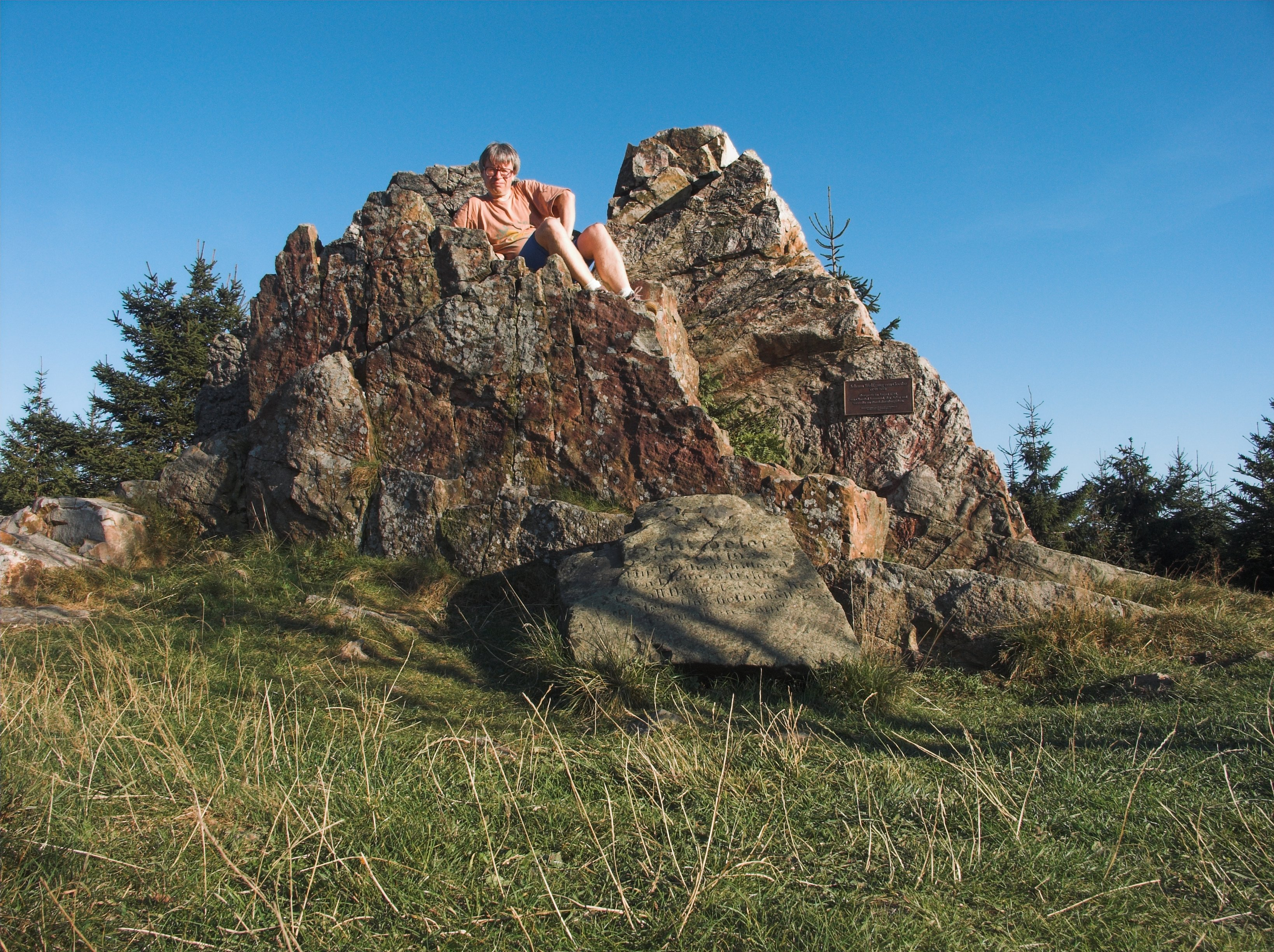
Hanskühnenburg Rocks

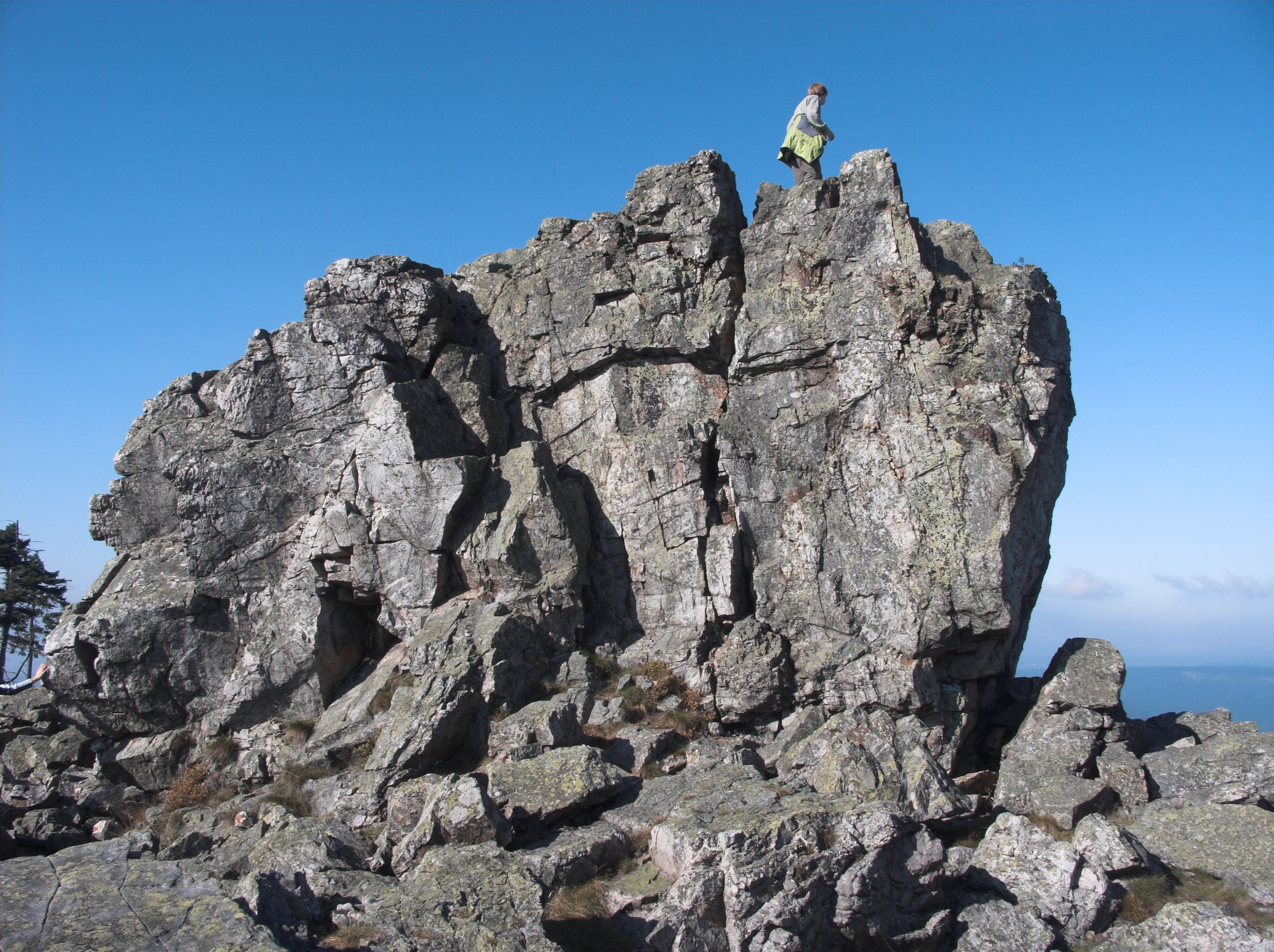
The crag from the south

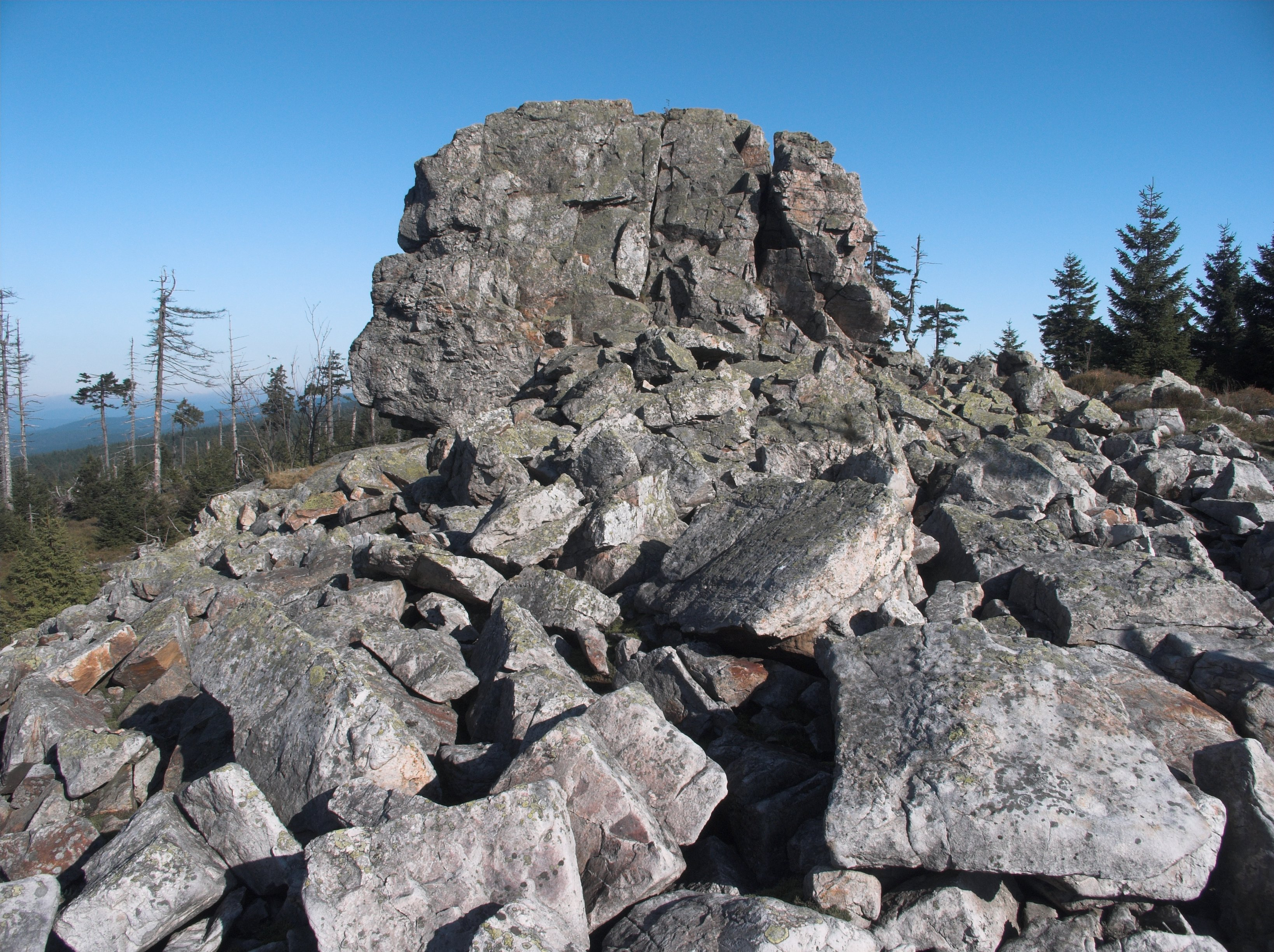
The crag from the west

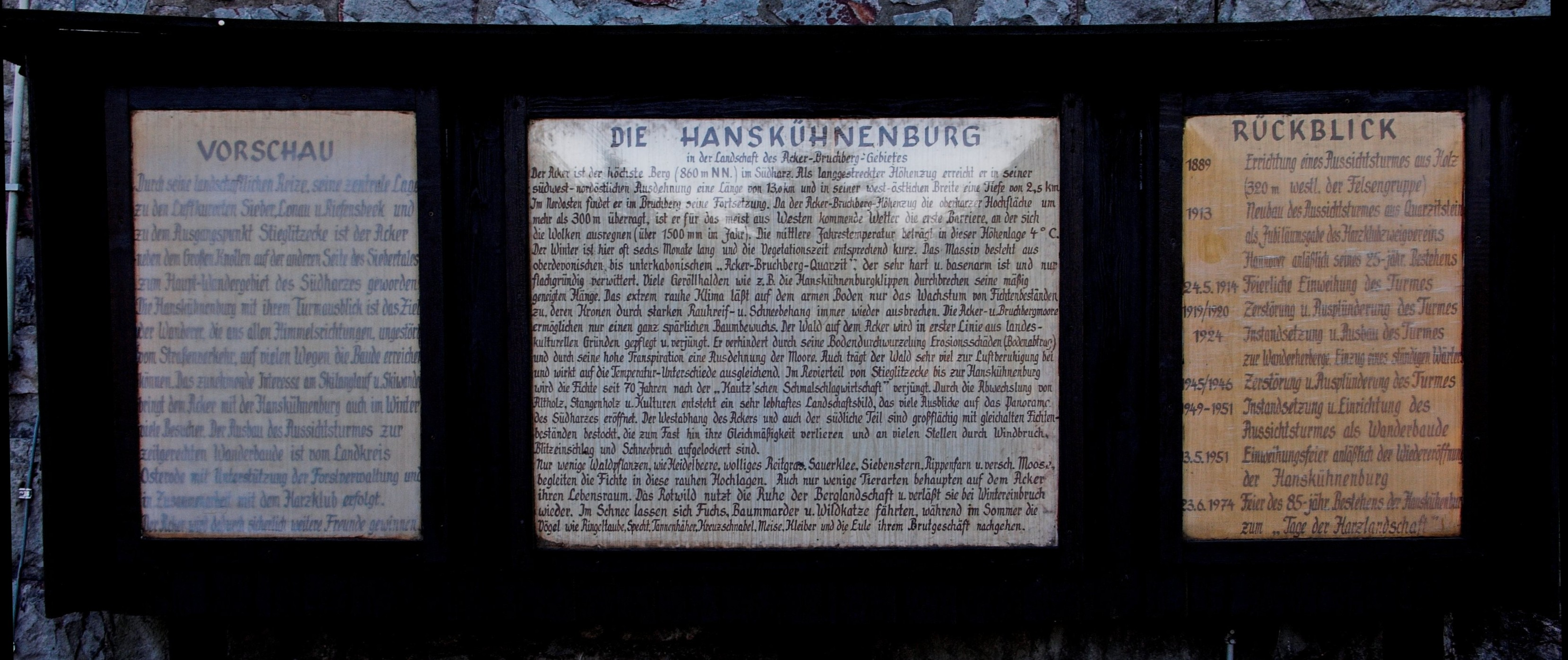
Information boards by the hut

The Hanskühnenburg is a mountain hut (German: Bergbaude) in the Harz mountains. It is located at a height of 811 m (2,661 ft) above sea level in fields known as Auf dem Acker, or simply Acker, in the middle of the Harz National Park and has its own observation tower. Its name comes from the legendary Hanskühnenburg Crag (Hanskühnenburg Klippe) 300 metres to the northwest, which was visited on 14 August 1784 by Johann Wolfgang von Goethe. Opposite the tower are the Hanskühnenburg Rocks (Hanskühnenburg Felsen) that are relatively small by comparison with the Klippe. A bronze plaque was mounted on these rocks in 1999 to commemorate Goethe's visit. In front of the Hanskühnenburg Rocks, a monument was erected in 1924 to Albert Leo Schlageter. It has since fallen over and is rather weathered.

== History ==
At the end of the 19th century, the Osterode branch of the Harz Club built the first wooden observation tower and a supervised refuge hut on the densely forested Acker crest, with the hut opening its doors in 1889. However, the tower proved insufficient to withstand the weather conditions, and by 1912, it had deteriorated to such an extent that it had to be dismantled One year later, the Hanover branch began the construction of a stone tower on the same spot, which was completed in 1914.

The outbreak of the First World War halted tourism, leading to the closure of the hut, which had been operated as an inn, especially since it was situated far from any other settlements. In 1922, the guest house reopened, only to close again with the onset of the Second World War.

In 1947, the hut, which had become quite dilapidated over time, reopened. However, it had to be closed again in 1957 when both the hut and tower were deemed off-limits by the police due to their deteriorating condition. By 1958, enough refurbishment had been completed to lift the ban, but the necessary fundamental overhaul was not undertaken. In 1971 the damage to the Hanskühnenburg was once again so serious, that the structure was closed again. After emergency repairs the tower and hut re-opened in 1972.

The Harz Club did not have the necessary means to restore the structure and transferred ownership in 1974 to the district of Osterode, which took on the conversion and upgrade of the Hanskühnenburg. In 1975 this was completed at a cost of 500,000 DM and the operation of the hut started up again.

In 1976, a 13.5 km (8.4 mi) long cross-country skiing trail, the Ackerloipe, was completed and, as a result, the Hanskühnenburg became a popular stop for langlauf skiers.

Since the 1960s, the forest on the Acker crest has steadily retreated. At one time, the hut was hidden in thick forest; today, it is visible from a long way off. The tower offers a good all-round view over the mountains of the Upper Harz. It is also the only spot from where the two former centres of the Upper Harz mining industry, Clausthal and Sankt Andreasberg, can be seen at the same time.

== Walking trails ==
The Hanskühnenburg may be reached from all directions on numerous walking trails. There are longer walks from Osterode via the town forest (Stadtwald) and crest path (Kammweg) or along the Söse Reservoir. From Herzberg a path climbs from Lonau through the valleys of the Großer Lonau (metalled road) and the Sieber. The height difference is markedly less on the route from Riefensbeek-Kamschlacken to the hut. The easiest way to get to the hut, however, is from Stieglitzecke on the Harz High Road. Here there is a large car park and a bus stop. From the Stieglitzecke there are two routes to the Hanskühnenburg. The path on the eastern side is a wide walking track with only one steep section shortly before the hut. Considerably better views, especially in the morning, are offered by the path on the west side of the Acker. This path is however very hard going and rather boggy because the rain gutters have not been replaced for some time.

The tower is only accessible when the restaurant is open.

The Hahnskühnenburg is checkpoint no. 144 in the Harzer Wandernadel system, a popular network of walking trails.
