= Sieber (river) =

River in Germany

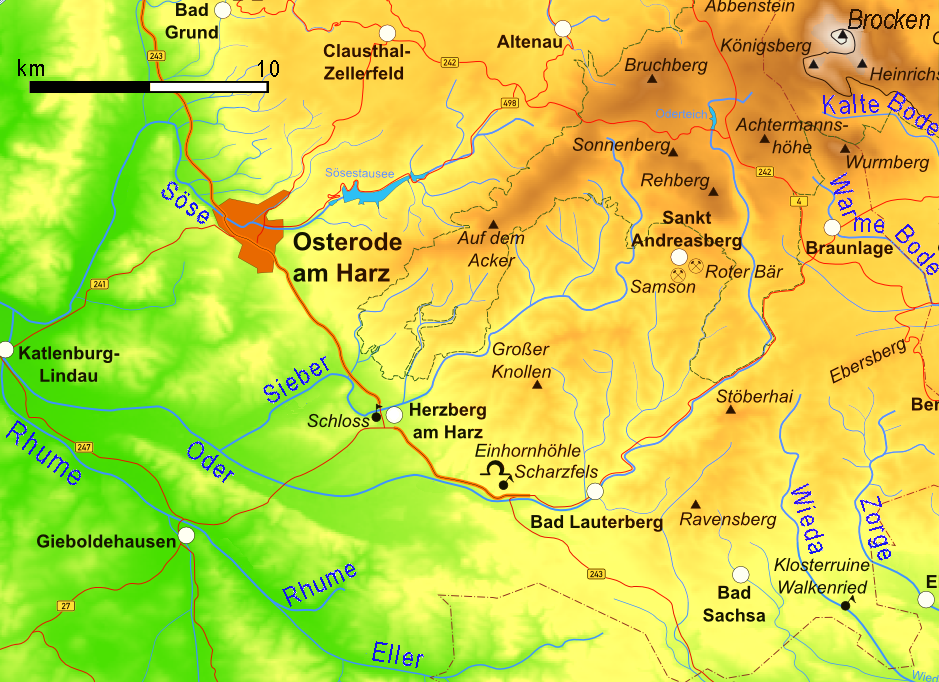
- The southwestern Harz with the Sieber river

Location
- Country: Germany
- State: Lower Saxony

Physical characteristics
- Source
  - location: on the Bruchberg in the Harz
  - elevation: ca. 800 m above sea level (NN)
- Mouth
  - location: In Hattorf into the Oder
  - coordinates: 51°38′43″N 10°13′49″E
  - elevation: 174 m above sea level (NN)
- Length: 35.3 km (21.9 mi)
- Basin size: 141 km^{2} (54 sq mi)

Basin features
- River system: Oder→ Rhume→ Leine→ Aller→ Weser→ North Sea
- Landmarks: Small towns: Herzberg
- Tributaries
  - right: Große Kulmke, Große Lonau, Große Steinau, Kleine Steinau

Sieber (German pronunciation: [ˈziːbɐ]) is a river of Lower Saxony, Germany, in the Harz mountains. It is 35 kilometres (22 mi) long and a right hand tributary of the Oder.

The Sieber rises at 760 metres on the Bruchberg massif and flows through Herzberg before discharging at Hattorf into the Oder which, in turn, flows into the Rhume. Its tributaries include the Große Kulmke, Große Lonau and Goldenke.

In February 1910, as part of his hydrological research into the Rhumequelle, Karl Thürnau dyed the Sieber tributary of the Eichelbach (Herzberg) with six kilogrammes of fluorescein. Three days later, weakly dyed water appeared in the main source of the Rhumequelle. This was confirmed in 1980 by dye tracing carried out by the Geological Survey of Lower Saxony (Niedersächsischen Landesamtes für Bodenforschung). This also indicated links between the Rhumequelle and the Sieber near Hörden and the Oder near Scharzfeld.

The construction of a dam was planned but never realised. As a result the Sieber valley is the only unregulated river valley in the western Harz. The upper Sieber valley has been out-of-bounds to motor traffic since the 1980s from the Forsthaus Königshof and lies partly within the Harz National Park – the road leads to the B 242 federal highway northwest of Sonnenberg.

The river gives its name to the village of Sieber in the middle of the Sieber valley.

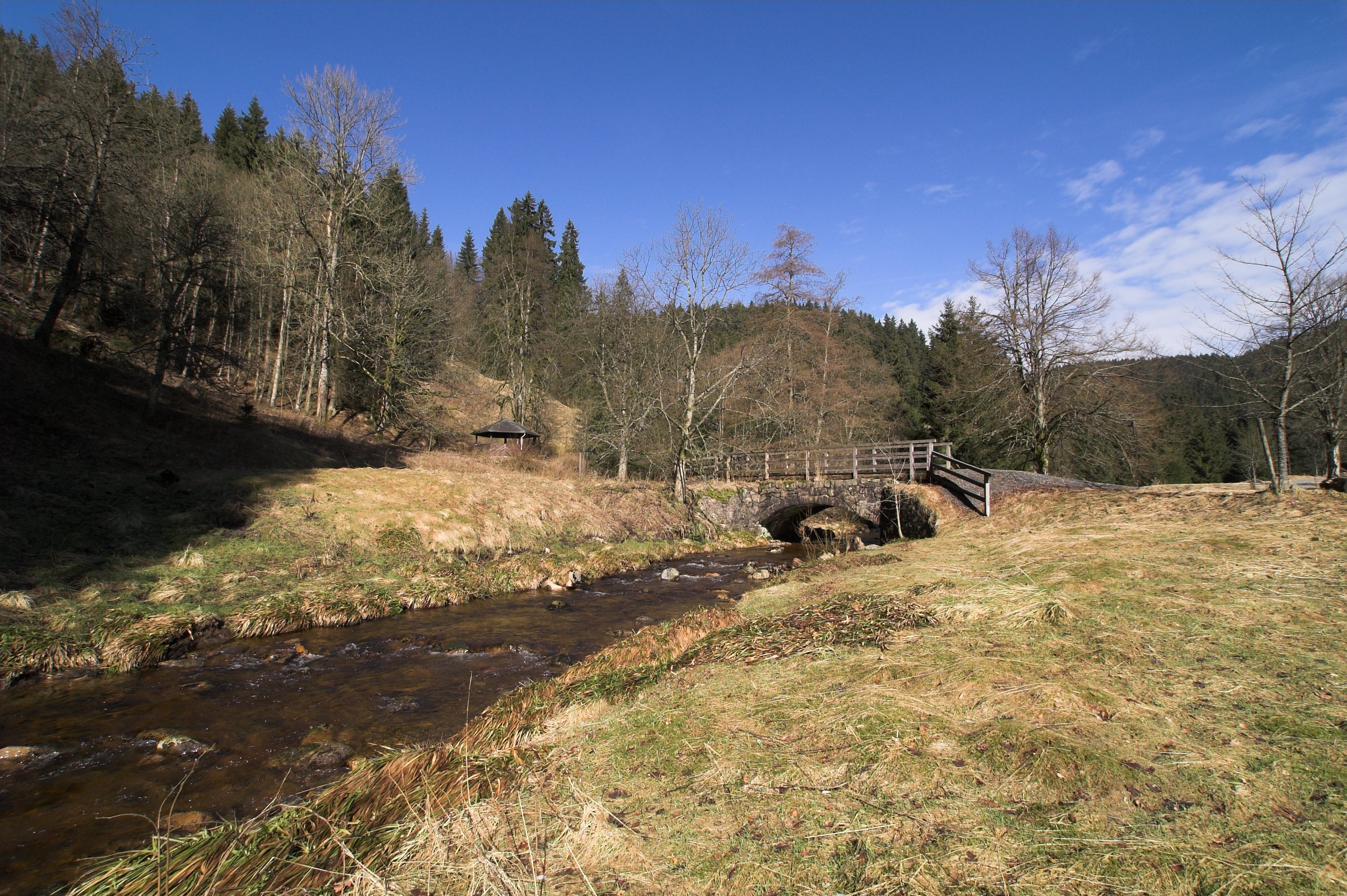
The Schluft is the 'transport hub' of the upper Sieber Valley. Goethe walked here.

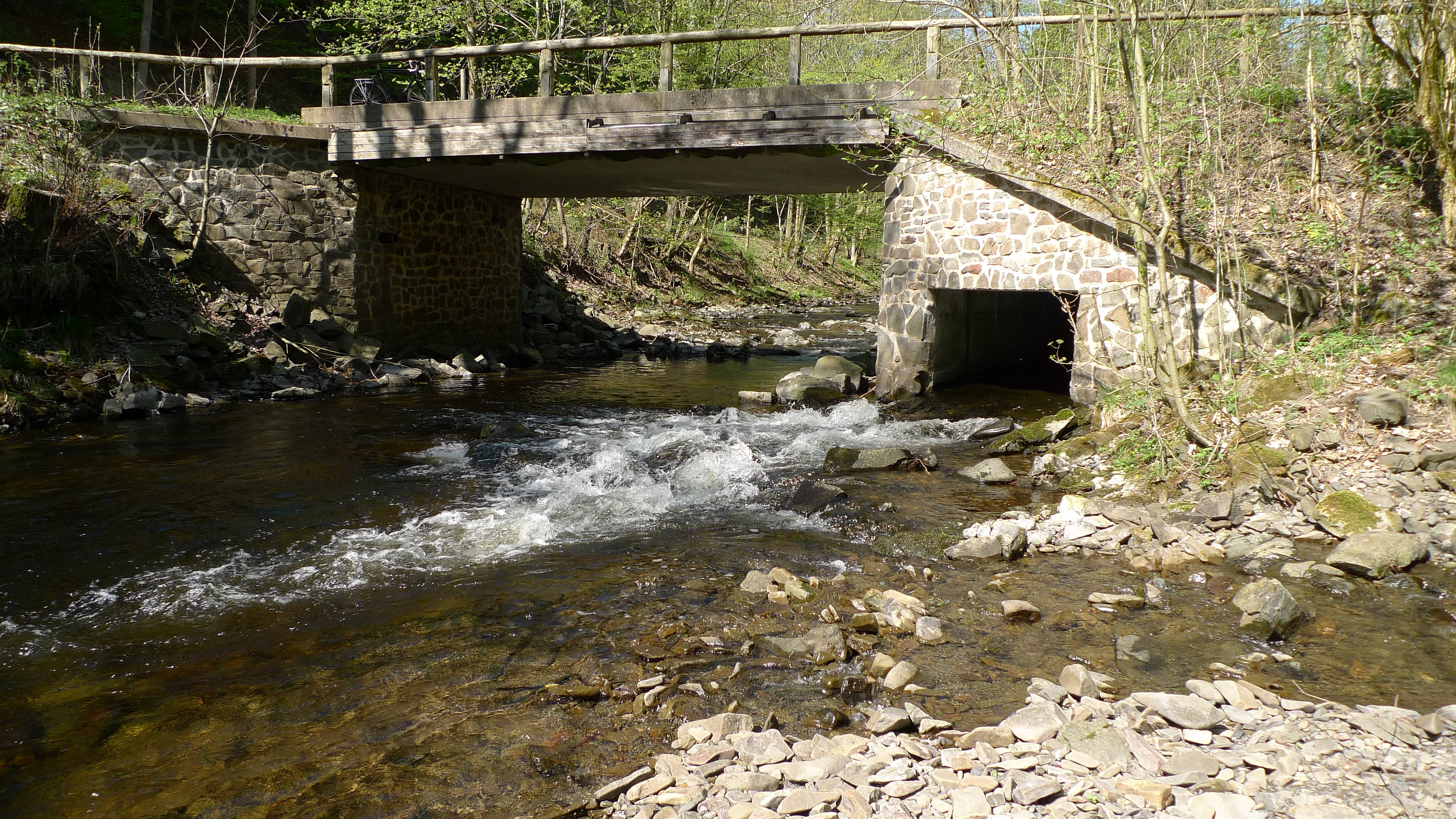
The Sieber in "Paradies" (paradise) between Herzberg and the village of Sieber

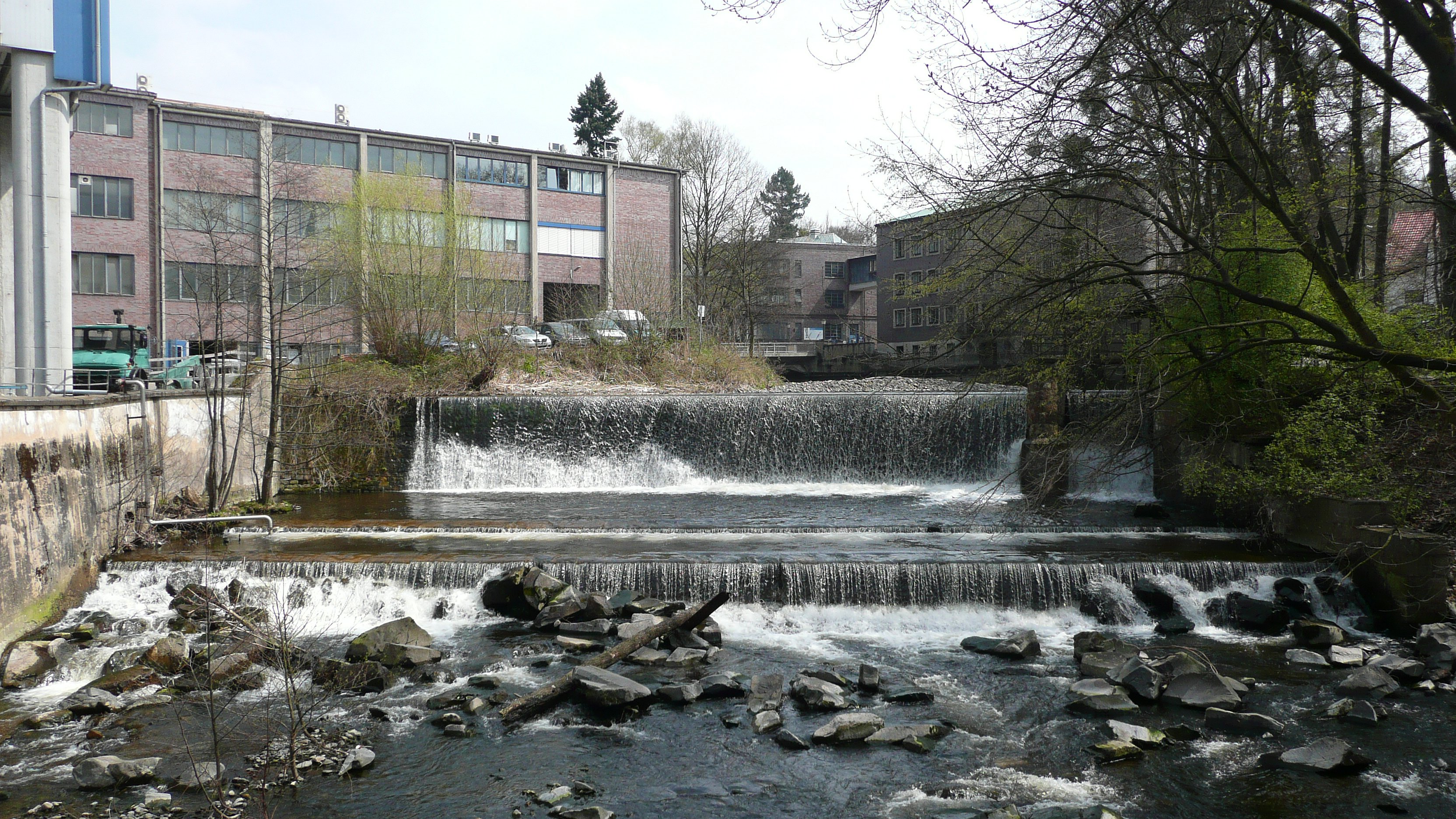
The Sieber Weir near the Herzberg paper factory

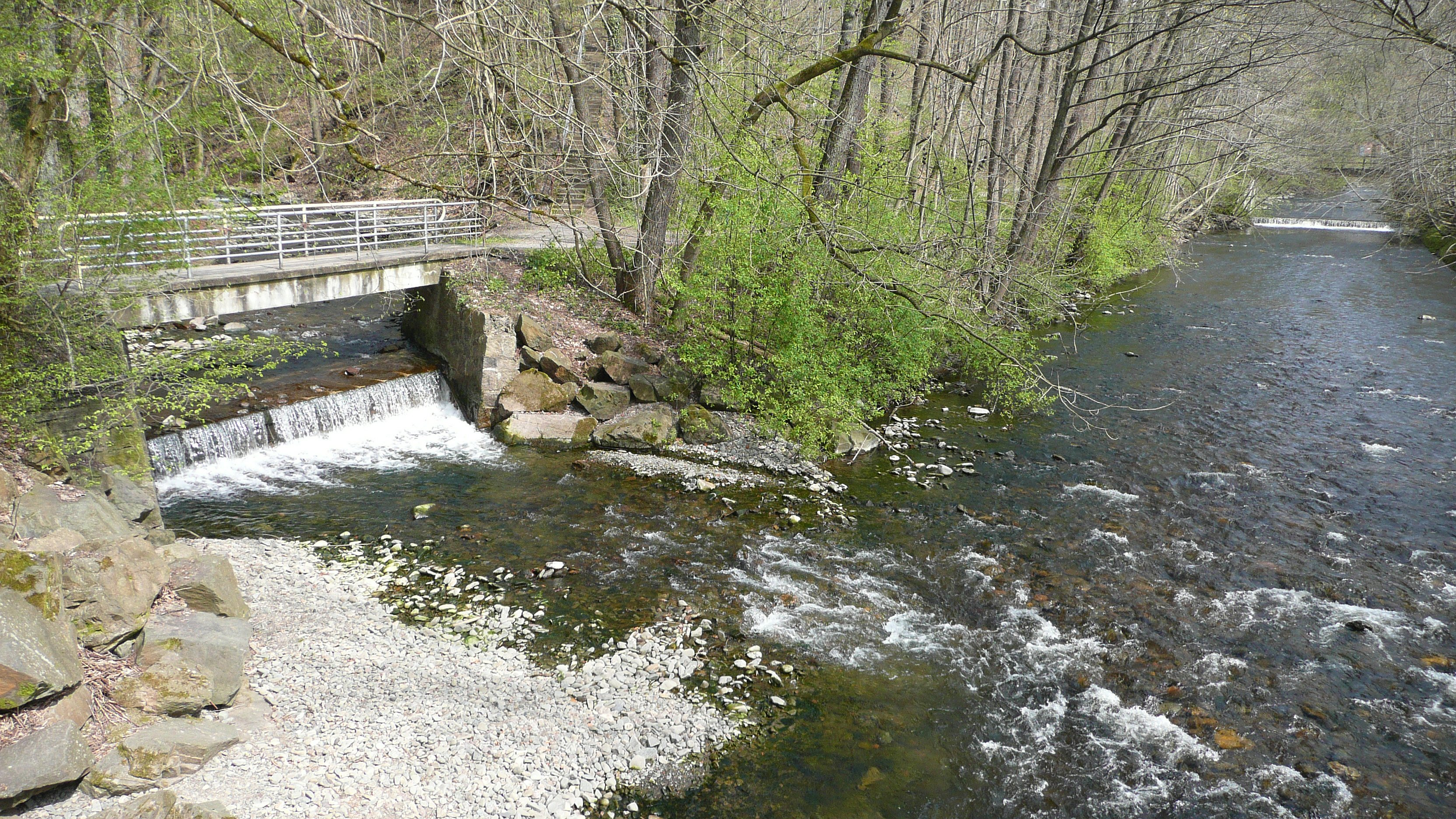
Confluence of the Große Lonau with the Sieber near Herzberg

== See also ==
- List of rivers of Lower Saxony
