= Auf dem Acker =

Mountain in Lower Saxony, Germany

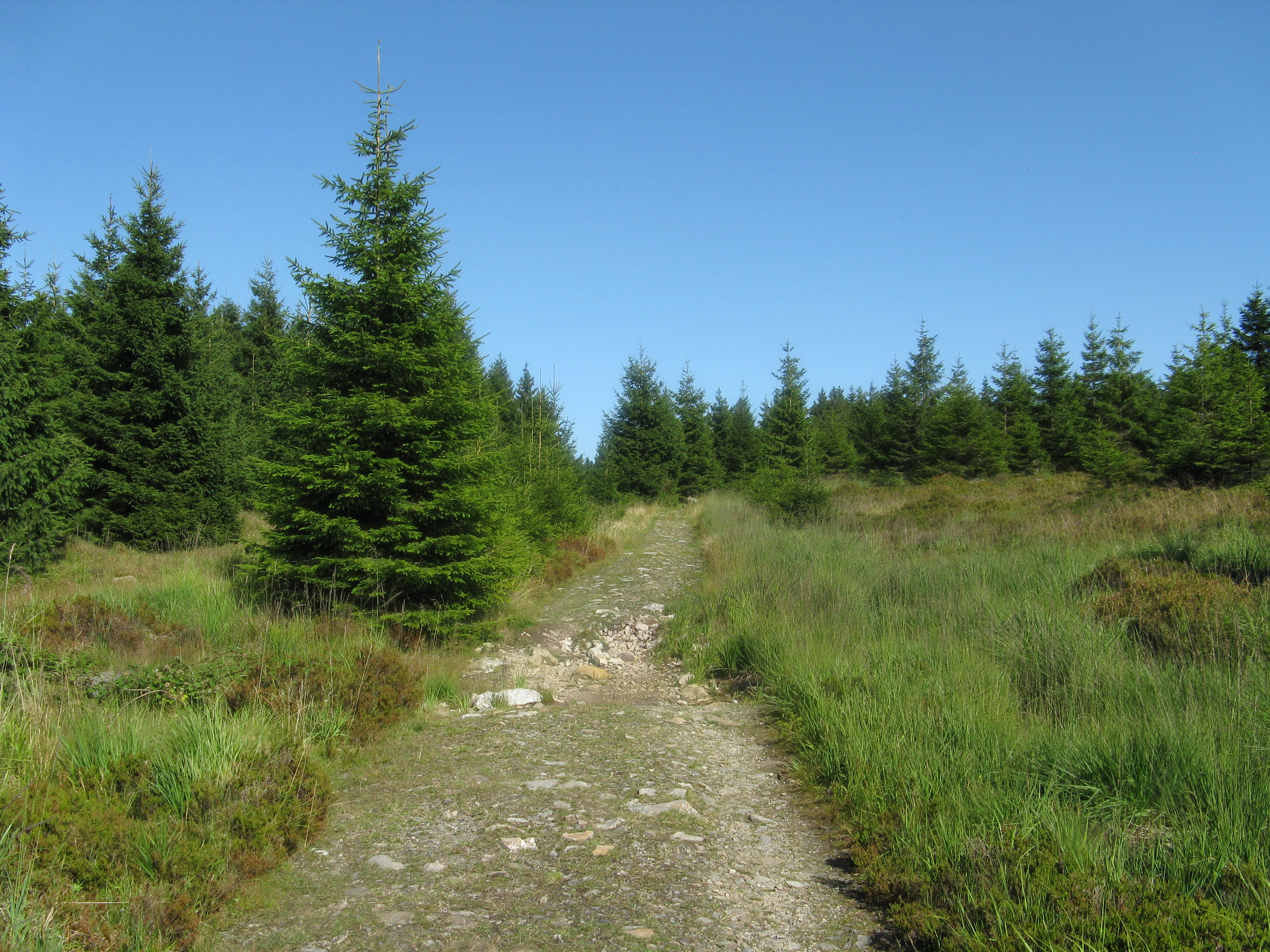
- The Reitstieg path on the Acker

Highest point
- Elevation: 865.1 m above sea level (NN) (2,838 ft)
- Prominence: 58.6 m ↓ Near Stieglitzecke → Bruchberg
- Isolation: 3.2 km → Bruchberg
- Coordinates: 51°44′56″N 10°26′43″E

Geography
- Location within Lower Saxony
- Location: Niedersachsen, Germany
- Parent range: Harz Mountains

Geology
- Mountain type: Acker Bruchberg Quartzite

Auf dem Acker (commonly called the Acker) is a mountain ridge up to 865.1 m (2,838 ft) high, which is located in the southwestern part of the Harz mountains in Lower Saxony (Germany).

== Geography ==
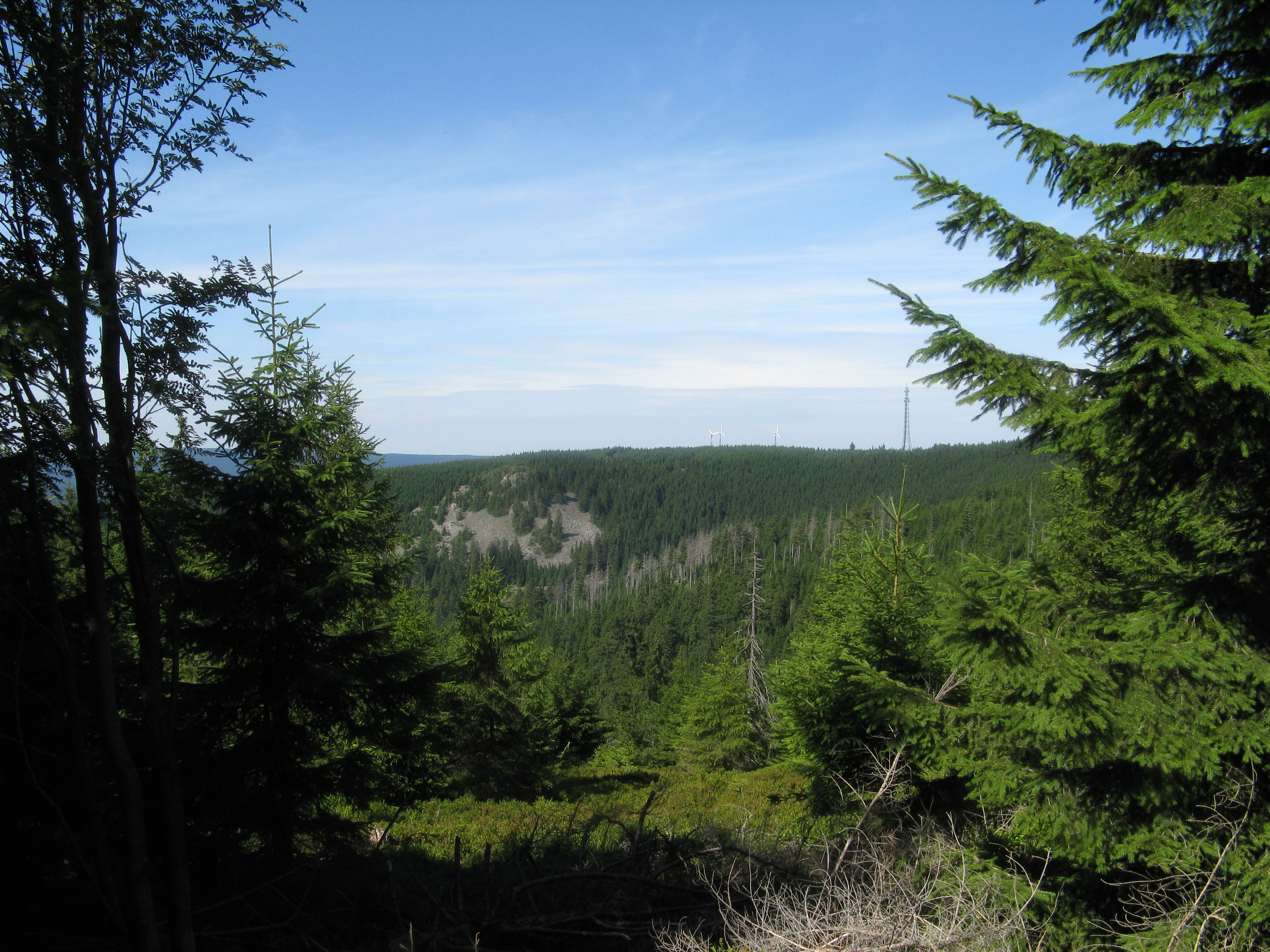
View from the Reitstieg to Stieglitzeck. Left: the Hammerstein Crags

The ridge begins south of the Bruchberg near Stieglitzecke (on the B 242) and runs from there for about 13 kilometres (8.1 mi) towards the southwest. For the first 6 kilometres (3.7 mi) its crest is continuously higher than 800 metres. Its southwestern foothills transition to the Harz Foreland at Osterode am Harz. Together with the Bruchberg, the Acker forms the Acker-Bruchberg Massif. Northwest of the ridge lies the valley of the River Söse and the Söse Reservoir, as well as the villages of Riefensbeek and Kamschlacken. South of the ridge lie the villages of Lonau and Sieber. The Hanskühnenburg lies roughly in the middle of the ridge at a height of 811 metres.

== National Park and environment ==
Large sections of the ridge lie within the Harz National Park and may therefore only be entered on designated trails. Between the Hanskühnenburg and Stieglitzecke parts of the area around the crest consist of raised bog. The ridgeway running through the moor was closed in the mid-1990s, shortly after the establishment of national park in order to protect the environment.

== Tors and crags ==
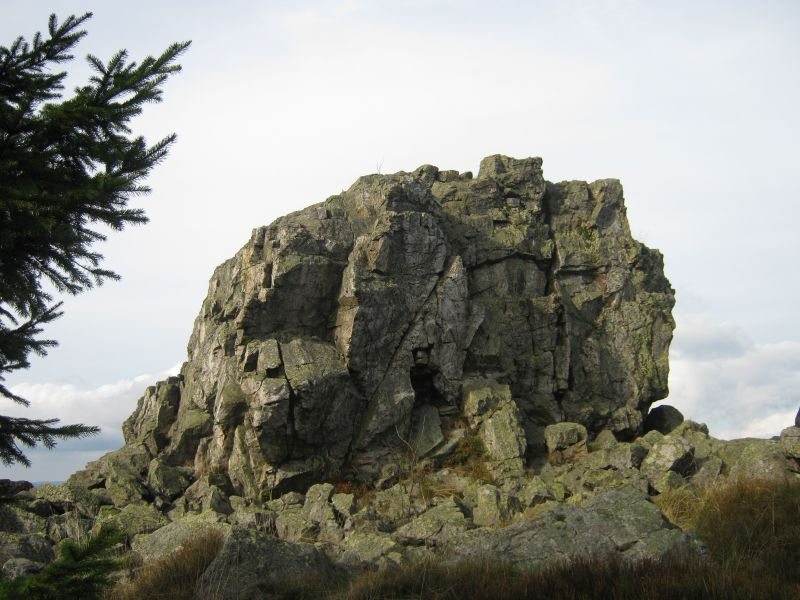
The Hanskühnenburgklippe

There are a large number of tors and crags on Auf dem Acker:

- Sösestein Coordinates: 51.7665°N 10.4523°E
- Hammersteinklippen Coordinates: 51.7667°N 10.4503°E
- Mönchskappenklippe Coordinates: 51.7470°N 10.4626°E
- Goldenkerklippe Coordinates: 51.7338°N 10.4224°E
- Stollenklippe Coordinates: 51.7274°N 10.4153°E
- Hanskühnenburgklippe (on the crest, roughly 818 m high, see Hanskühnenburg) Coordinates: 51.7300°N 10.4064°E
- Hanskühnenburgfelsen (on the crest directly in front of the Hanskühnenburg, roughly 815 m high, see Hanskühnenburg) Coordinates: 51.7279°N 10.4036°E
- Kanapeeklippe Coordinates: 51.7263°N 10.3961°E
- Seilerklippe (on the crest, roughly 760 m high) Coordinates: 51.7213°N 10.3838°E
- Sophienklippe Coordinates: 51.7156°N 10.3644°E
- Spießerklippe Coordinates: 51.7142°N 10.3585°E

== Walking ==
At the northeastern end of the ridge near Stieglitzecke is the Magdeburg Hut (Magdeburger Hütte), a refuge hut, and a large car park. From here two trails lead up the Acker; they are described in more detail in the article on the Hanskühnenburg. From the Hanskühnenburg the ridgeway, known as the Wet Way (Nasser Weg) runs in a southwesterly direction along the crest towards Osterode. Because the ridge here is only lightly vegetated with bilberry and low pines, there are many viewing points with good views over the Harz and into the Harz Foreland. On or by the Acker are several refuge huts that have checkpoints as part of the Harzer Wandernadel hiking network:

- Morgenbrodtshütte am Großen Wehr—no. 146.
- Waidmannsruhe hut no. 148.
- Hanskühnenburg—no. 144.
- Köte am Schindelkopf hut no. 143

A stage of the Harzer Baudensteig trail runs from Lerbach over the Acker to Sieber.

== Geology ==
The ridge is largely composed of Acker-Bruchberg Quartzite.

== Origin of the name ==
In various sources it is maintained that the name Acker is derived from the Middle High German word Agger which means "crest" or "embankment". However, there is no definite source for this theory. On the other hand, Agger is a Latin word and means "earth embankment", see Agger (ancient Rome).

== Sources ==
- Topographische Karte 1:25000, Nr. 4228 Riefensbeek (enthält den größten Teil des Bergrückens)
- Topographische Karte 1:25000, Nr. 4227 Osterode am Harz (enthält die südwestlichen Ausläufer)
