= Harz National Park =

National Park in Lower Saxony and Saxony-Anhalt, Germany

- IUCN category II (national park)

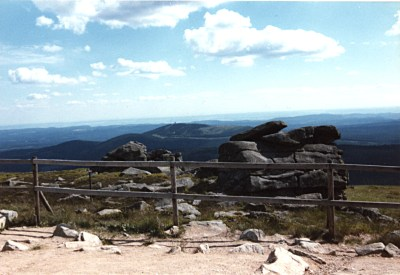
- View from Brocken summit
- Interactive map of Harz National Park
- Location: Lower Saxony and Saxony-Anhalt, Germany
- Coordinates: 51°47′N 10°34′E
- Area: 247 km^{2} (95 sq mi)
- Established: 1990, 1994, 2006
- Governing body: Nationalparkverwaltung Harz; Lindenallee 35; 38855 Wernigerode
- Website: www.nationalpark-harz.de/en/

Harz National Park is a protected area in the German federal states of Lower Saxony and Saxony-Anhalt. It comprises portions of the western Harz mountain range, extending from Herzberg and Bad Lauterberg at the southern edge to Bad Harzburg and Ilsenburg on the northern slopes. 95% of the area is covered with forests, mainly with spruce and beech woods, including several bogs, granite rocks and creeks. The park is part of the Natura 2000 network of the European Union.

In its current form, the park was created on January 1, 2006, by the merger of the Harz National Park in Lower Saxony, established in 1994, and the Upper Harz National Park in Saxony-Anhalt, established in 1990. As the former inner German border ran through the Harz, large parts of the range were prohibited areas, that apart from the fortifications had remained completely unaffected for decades. Today the park covers parts of the districts of Goslar, Göttingen and Harz.

Rare animals of the Harz National Park include the white-throated dipper, the black stork, peregrine falcon, the European wildcat and especially the Eurasian lynx. The last lynx in the Harz Mountains had been shot in 1818, but in 1999 a project for reintroducing was established. Since 2002 several wild lynxes gave birth. An attempt to return the western capercaillie (Auerhuhn) however did not succeed.

== Geography ==
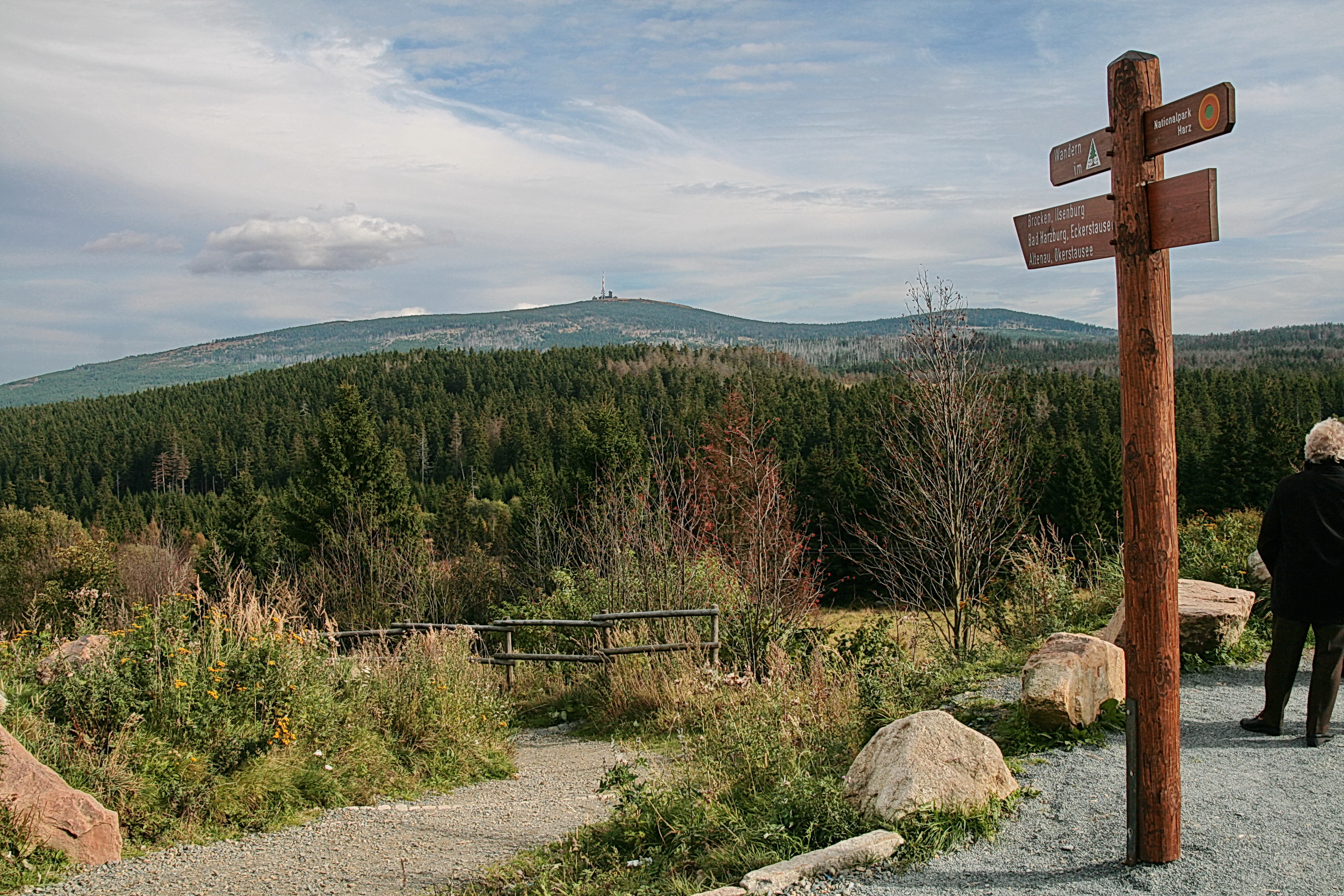
View from Torfhaus to the Brocken

The 24,700 hectares of the Harz National Park cover about 10 percent of the total area of the Harz. The park lies in the western part of the Harz (see Upper Harz) and stretches from Wernigerode and Ilsenburg in the north to Herzberg and Bad Lauterberg in the south. Near its perimeter the park terrain is about 230 m above sea level (NN) in the north and 270 m above NN in the south and climbs to 1,141.1 m above NN at the summit of Brocken.

Several rivers have their sources in the national park, including the Bode, the Oder and the Ilse, a tributary of the Oker. The waters of the Oder, flowing southwards, are collected in the historic Oderteich reservoir, finished in 1722 to supply the mines in Sankt Andreasberg, and feed the Oder Dam on the southeastern edge of the park. Other dams and lakes within or bordering on the national park include the Ecker Dam and the Silberteich. The highest elevations are the Brocken, the Bruchberg and the Achtermann.

== History ==
The present, pan-state Nationalpark Harz was formed on 1 January 2006 from the merger of the old park of the same name in Lower Saxony and the High Harz National Park (Nationalpark Hochharz) in Saxony-Anhalt. Since the merger the head of this major nature conservation area has been Andreas Pusch.

The Upper Harz National Park was established as part of GDR's national park programme on 1 October 1990, two days before the reunification of Germany, on the basis of a ministerial decision by the East German government. The park included large parts of the eastern Harz, roughly from the Ecker Dam and the national park municipality of Ilsenburg in the north and Schierke in the south as well as the Brocken. The region is characterised by a relatively undisturbed plant and animal environment, which is mainly due to its location immediately next to the old Inner German Border. In the German Democratic Republic era, Brocken was accessible until 1961 with an easily obtained pass. From 13 August 1961 it became an out-of-bounds area, which meant that tourists could no longer visit it. In the mid-1980s the first problems appeared in the Harz, such as bark beetle and fungal infestation. In the wake of the spirit of optimism during the time around reunification it was exactly this that gave impetus for the establishment of the national park. On 1 January 1991 a national park headquarters in Wernigerode was set up under the leadership of Hubertus Hlawatsch. Hlawatsch's successor was Peter Gaffert, who ran the eastern park from 1995 until its merger with the Harz National Park in the western Harz on 1 January 2006.

The Lower Saxon part of the park was opened on 1 January 1994 after four years of preparation. Its founding father was Dr. Wolf-Eberhard Barth. Although a combined national park project was discussed soon after reunification by both states it was another twelve years before the parks were merged.

The Harz National Park belongs to the European umbrella organisation EUROPARC Federation, a federation of national parks, biosphere reserves and nature parks. It concerns itself inter alia with the exchange of information, ustausch, advanced education and public relations. The German section, EUROPARC Deutschland, of this umbrella organisation has also organised the merger of many large conservation areas in Germany.

In 2005 the national park was included in the European Charter for Sustainable Tourism in Protected Areas.

Currently the national park employs 188 staff, of which 59 work in the national park head office in Wernigerode or its outpost in Sankt Andreasberg OT Oderhaus. The 40 employees of the national park warden service, who are also known as rangers, conduct guided tours and look after tasks in connexion with environmental training, include the maintenance of information posts and national park buildings. (as at: 31 December 2007)

== Ecology ==
=== Flora ===
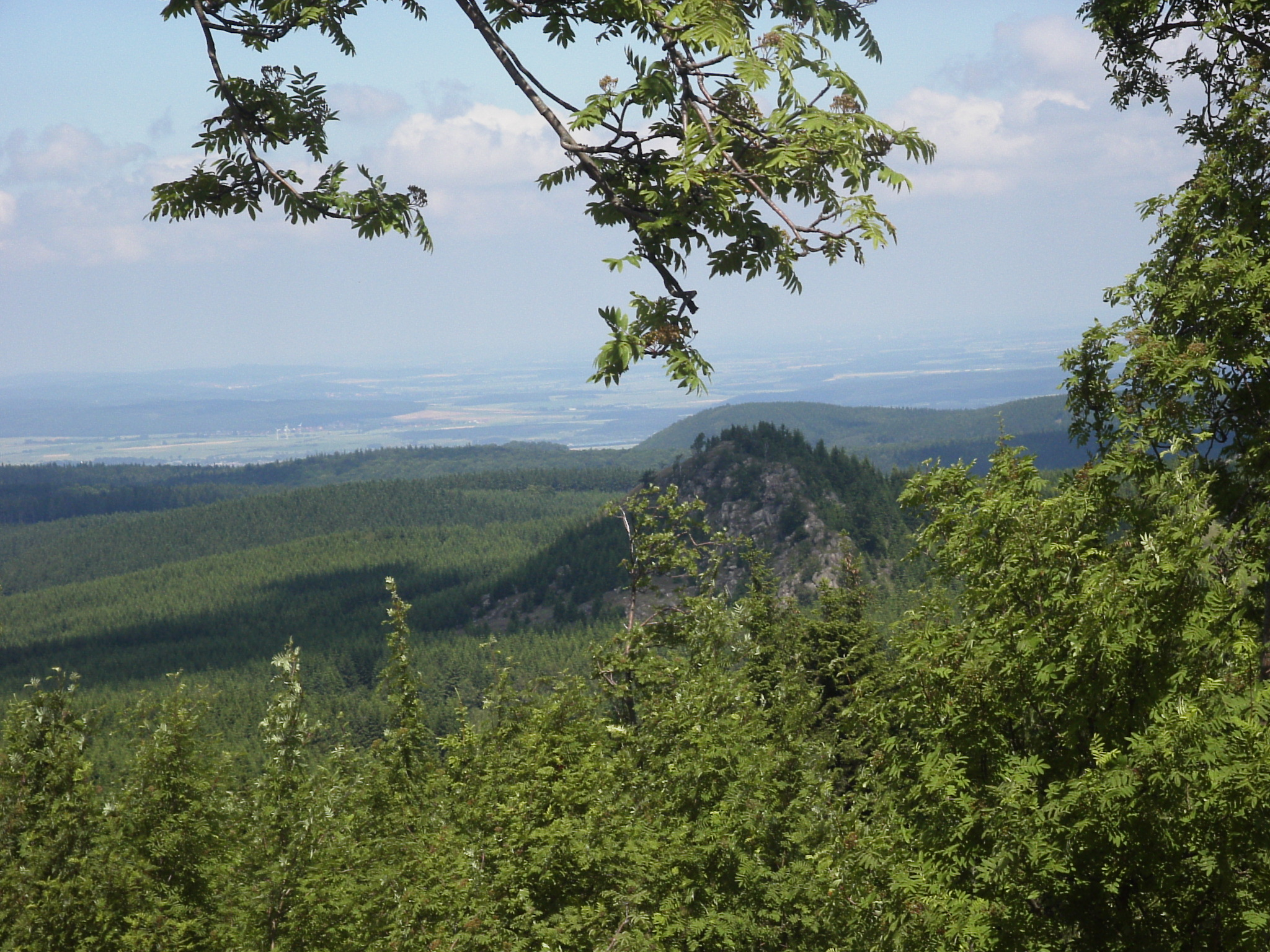
View of the Scharfenstein

The natural forests of the High Harz consist mainly of Norway spruce (Picea abies) and rowan (Sorbus aucuparia); deciduous trees only dominate below 600 m above sea level (NN). Since the Harz was partly deforested in the 19th century by ore mining, the count's head forester, Hans Dietrich von Zanthier, developed the concept of reforestation with fast-growing spruce trees. This led to the now widespread spruce monocultures. Unlike "Harz pine", the pines introduced from other regions cope less well with snow and ice conditions in the Harz and are thus more prone to bark beetle infestation.

Currently 82 percent of the forest consists of spruce stands. Only 12 percent of the trees are beeches. The remaining 6 percent are species such as oak, rowan or birch (as at December 2007).

There are various vegetation zones in the Harz National Park. In the sub-alpine area above 1050 metres is the "battle zone" of the spruce tree. Here it is not uncommon to find trees over 250 years old and bent into bizarre shapes by the wind. But predominant here are the dwarf shrub heaths and raised bogs (Hochmoore). The altimontane vegetation zone is found between 750 m above sea level (NN) and 1,050 m above NN, dominated by spruce. These areas can be found in the vicinity of Schierke and Torfhaus. Not until the montane zone between 450 m above NN and 750 m above NN and the submontane zone is the vegetation dominated by beech forests. Today's beech stands grow primarily on acidic soil. The most commonly encountered forest type is the Hainsimsen beech forest. At heights above 700 m it is usually adjacent to spruce-beech mixed woodland. But in the national park this area has shrunk to just a few residual stands and has been largely replaced by spruce. In the region of Ilsenburg spruce monoculture occurs even down to 230 m above NN. In these zones the spruce is not native and, as a result of climate change, it has suffered increasingly from bark beetle infestation. Currently the National Park Service is having these areas reforested to encourage the original beech and maple, that used to dominate them, to resettle.

The Harz is home to the Brocken anemone (Pulsatilla alpina subsp. alba), which grows in Germany only on the plateau of Brocken. Its survival has however been especially endangered since German reunification by the onset of tourism. The Brocken Garden, a botanical garden on the summit of Brocken, deals mainly with the protection of plant species and restoration of the summit area.

Especially valuable for nature conservation, are the raised bogs formed by the restoration of former marshland. The conditions are favorable for this, as the bogs in the park are less impacted by human use than the bogs of the Lower Saxony plain. When wood became scarce in the Harz, the locals tried to take advantage of the peat bogs. This proved unprofitable due to the low calorific value of peat and the weather conditions in the High Harz. The bogs in the Harz are of international significance by virtue of their distinctiveness and flora.

=== Fauna ===
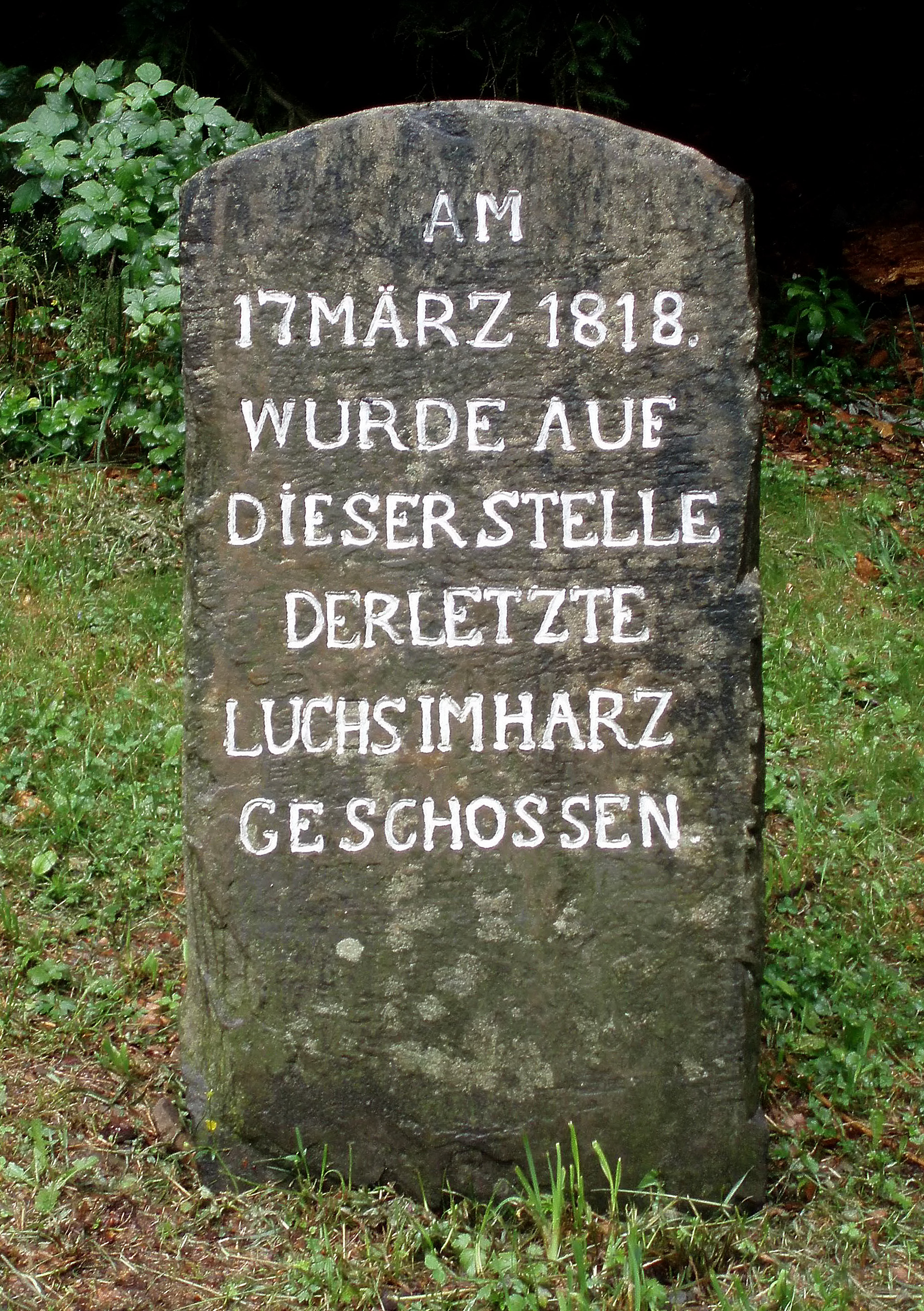
Lynx Stone of 1818

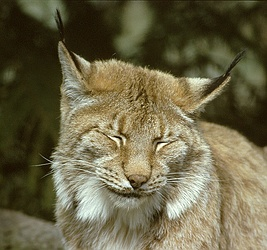
The lynx – once more in the wild in the Harz

The lynx now lives wild again in the Harz, having been eradicated from the mountains since the early 19th century. The last report of a successful lynx hunt in the Harz dates to 1818. In an eleven-day hunt, in which almost 200 people took part, a male lynx was brought down at Lautenthal. The so-called Lynx Stone recalls the success of that particular hunt. In 1999 it was decided to reintroduce the lynx. Between 2000 and 2004 alone, 19 were released from zoo breeding programmes. Before their release the animals are prepared in a large enclosure in order to acclimatized them to freedom. In addition there is a viewing enclosure near the National Park forest restaurant on the Rabenklippe where the shy cats can also be observed by visitors to the park. Since 2002, there have been several instances of kittens born in the wild. In March, a male lynx was fitted with a GPS transmitter, so precise details can now be obtained about the range of an animal. The project team receives information via SMS from the transmitter.

Another reintroduction project was the capercaillie, which died out in the Harz in 1920–1930. Its reintroduction began in 1978. Over the years about 1,000 birds have been reared and set free. In spite of the number of birds the population was not assessed as stable. Due to the lack of success, the project was closed in 2003.

The Harz is now one of Germany's most important habitats for the wild cat. It is classified in the Federal Republic of Germany as seriously endangered. It is assumed that the wild cat in the Harz has a stable population. It is widespread throughout the region, preferring those areas which are warmer, richer, more varied and better supplied with nutrients (lower lying deciduous forest with greater food availability).

In addition to lynx and wild cat, red deer and roe deer are also important species in the Harz National Park.

The most common invasive species is the raccoon, but occasionally the raccoon dog also occurs. The mouflon, which was in the 1930s located in different districts of the Harz for hunting reasons, is also found in the park.

=== Ecological problems ===
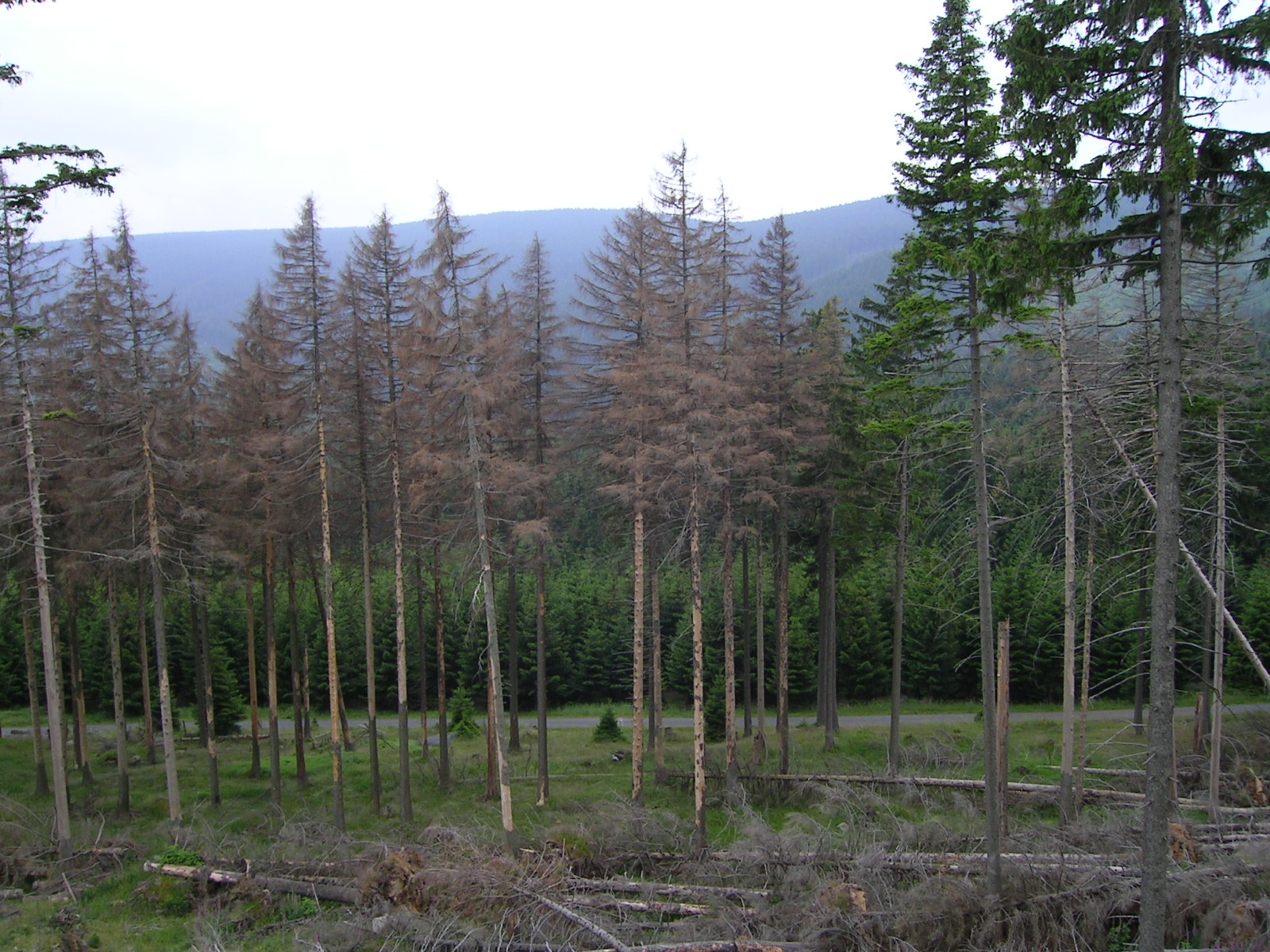
Trees damaged by bark beetle

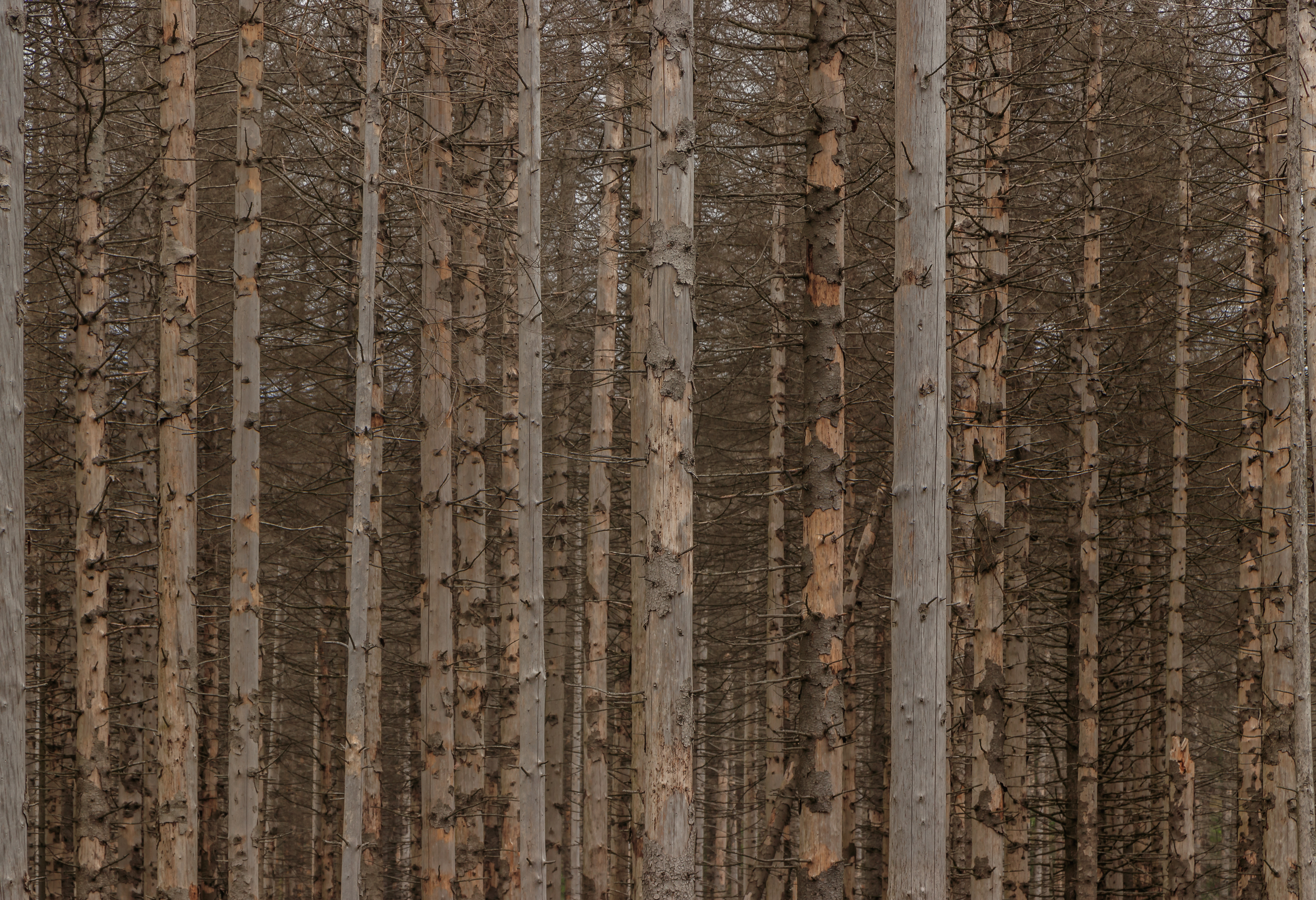
Dead spruce forest (Picea abies) in Harz National Park

Recently, the Harz National Park has suffered from bark beetle outbreaks as well as acid rain and other environmental problems. The bark beetle is on the rise here due to climate change and global warming. Since 2006, there has been increased bark beetle gradation. Hurricane Kyrill also caused severe damage in the region. Stands of trees, especially spruce, were torn down over wide areas. The National Park management came under fire from the local communities as a result of the bark beetle measures that were subsequently needed. In particular, the National Park community at Ilsenburg criticized the use of technology (e.g. harvesters). Because of the inaccessibility of the terrain there was really no other way to haul the wind blown tree trunks from the affected areas.

In the so-called natural development zone of the Harz National Park, which surrounds the core area, bark beetle measures are taken where necessary, and plantations are established where in order to encourage the natural development of the forest. To protect these beech and oak groves, national park wildlife management is required. Accusations that private or state hunts had taken place in the park turned out to be unfounded.

== Zoning ==
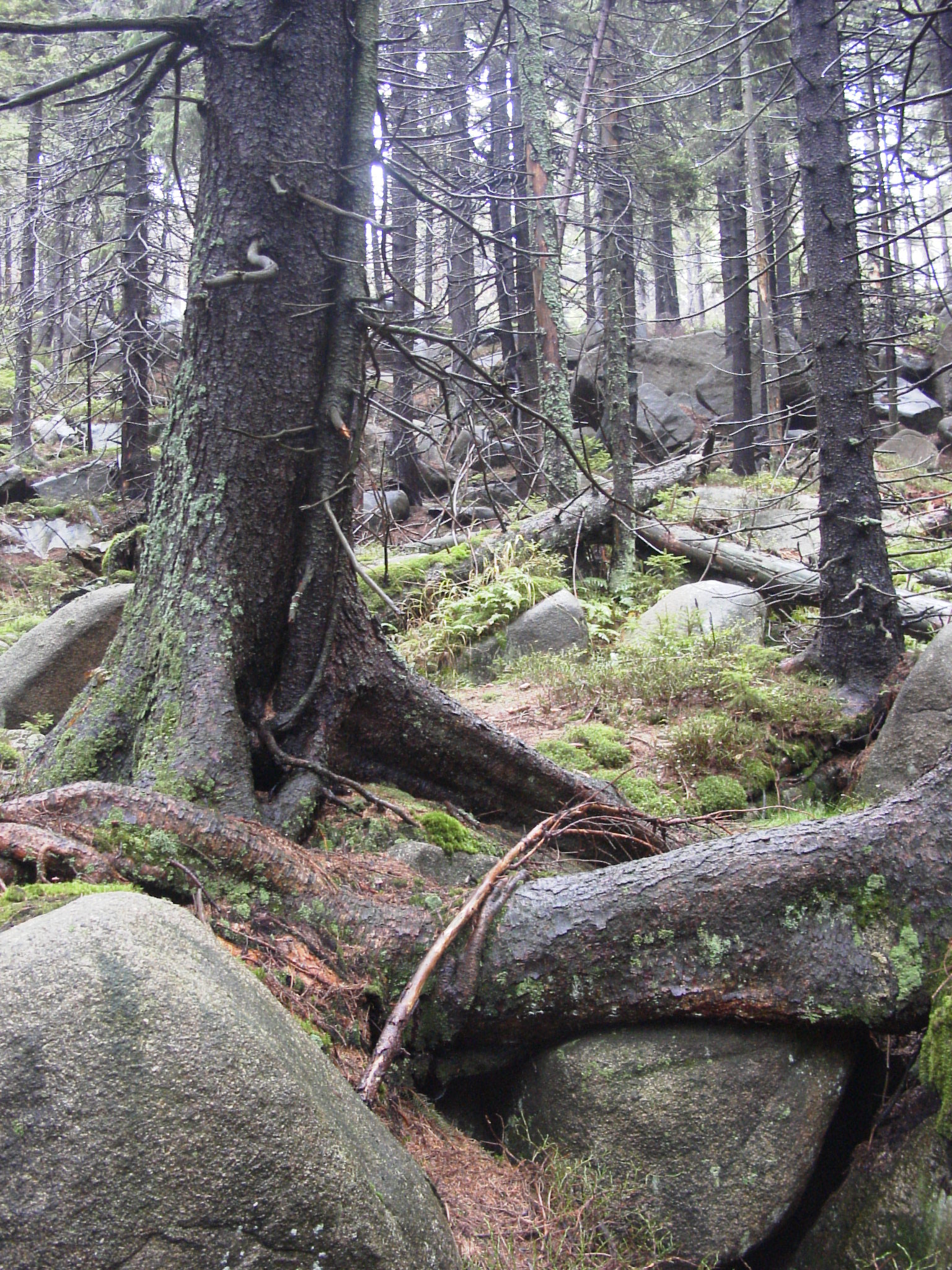
Ancient forest in the national park

The Harz National Park is recognised by the IUCN (World Conservation Union) as a national park (a Category II protected area in the IUCN system). To achieve that, according to the rules, at least 75 per cent of the area must be set aside as a natural biodiversity zone (core zone). In this zone nature must be left completely to itself. If this proportion is not achieved the region can be classified as a so-called developing national park, if it is assessed as fulfilling these conditions within 30 years.

The Harz National Park counts as a developing national park. Currently 60,3 per cent of the area of the park is designated as a natural biodiversity or core zone. The aim is to cross the 75 per cent threshold by 2020.

38,5 per cent of the park area is currently still a nature development zone. Here measures in lines with the forest development concept are carried out. The aim is to transfer the largest possible area of this natural development zone into the natural biodiversity zone.

A proportion of the park counts as a utilisation zone. This covers areas that are important for tourism or are historico-culturally significant, such as Brocken summit or mountain meadows. Here conservation measures will also be applied in future.

Furthermore, within a 500 metre wide strip on the edge of the national park, measures are being put into effect that will protect the adjacent areas.

== Visitor centre ==
There are several visitor centres, one of them in the Brocken House on the Brocken summit.

== See also ==
- Hiking trails in Germany
