= Kaiser tower =

Monuments built in honor of German emperors in Austria-Hungary

Emperor towers or Kaiser towers (German: Kaisertürme or Kaiserwarten) are monuments that were built up to 1918 in honour of the German emperors William I, Frederick III and Wilhelm II in the German Empire or Emperor Franz Josef in Austria-Hungary.

The construction of these towers was also intended to counter the so-called Bismarck cult which had resulted, for example, in the erection of hundreds of Bismarck towers and columns.

== Kaiser towers in Germany ==
- Kaiser Tower (Lautertal) on the Neunkircher Höhe in the Odenwald
- Kaiser Tower (Wernigerode) on the Armeleuteberg near Wernigerode
- Kaiser tower on the Steinberg near Goslar
- Kaiser Tower (Hausberg) Kaiser tower in Hirschberg (Riesengebirge), now in Poland
- Kaiser tower near Leutenberg in Thuringia
- Kaiser tower near Blankenburg (Harz), renamed the Wilhelm Raabe Tower

The Kaiser tower in Quedlinburg is medieval.

== Kaiser towers in Austria-Hungary ==
- Kaiser tower (Nakléřov) Kaiser Tower on the site of the Battle of Kulm in northern Bohemia, now in the Czech Republic; after 1918 renamed the Karl Weis Tower (Karl-Weis-Warte), later demolished

== See also ==
- Kaiser Wilhelm Tower
- Emperor William monuments
