= Elversstein =

Coordinates: 51°48′16.9″N 10°44′5″E

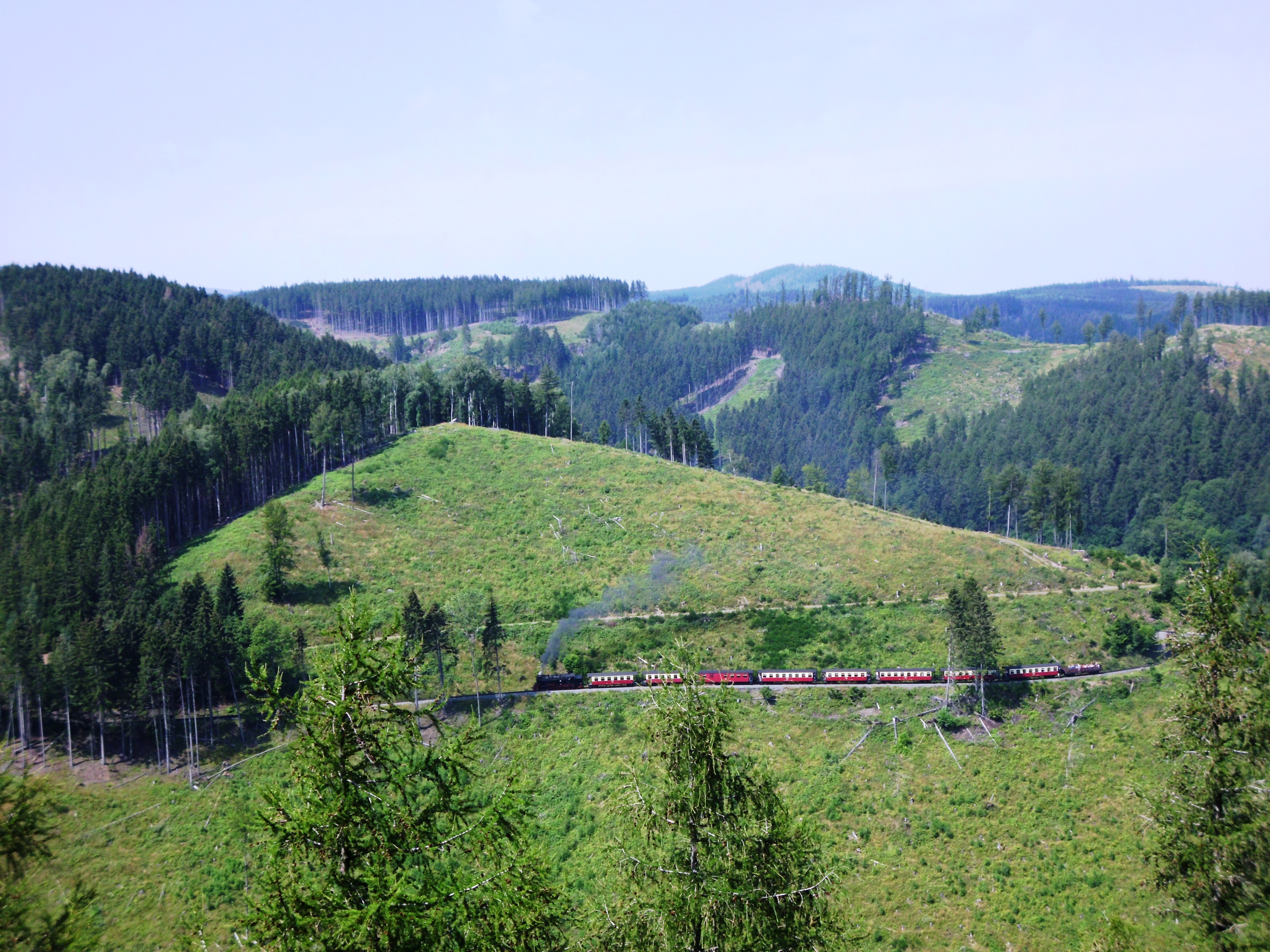
Steam train on the Harz Narrow Gauge Railways seen from the Elversstein

The Elversstein in the Harz Mountains of Germany is a granite rock formation with a maximum elevation of 499 m above sea level (NN) on the Steinberg (ca. 525 m above NN) near Hasserode in the county of Harz in Saxony-Anhalt.

== Name ==
The Elversstein is named after Rudolph Elvers (1825–1891), a German lawyer and civil servant who, amongst other things, acted as the Landrat of the county of Wernigerode in the Prussian Province of Saxony.

== Location ==
The Elversstein lies within the Harz/Saxony-Anhalt Nature Park about 2 km south-southwest of the village of Hasserode in the borough of Wernigerode, the latter town adjoining Hasselrode to the northeast. It is located on the northwest flank of the Steinberg east and above the Drängetal, through which the Drängetalwasser, a tributary of the Braunes Wasser, flows. The Landesstraße 100 (Hasserode–Drei Annen Hohne) also runs through this valley.

== Views ==
The view from the Elversstein over the Harz countryside includes the Brocken (1,141.1 m above NN), the highest mountain in the Harz. In addition, the Trans-Harz Railway can be seen on the far side of the Drängetal and, sometimes, a train on this narrow gauge railway may be seen entering or leaving the 58 metre long Thumkuhlenkopf Tunnel.

== Hiking ==
The Elversstein is a popular hiking destination that can be reached from Hasserode on the Elverssteinpfad. On the forest track above it walkers can make their way back past the Steinbergskopf (478.5 m above NN). The Kaiser Tower on the Armeleuteberg can be reached by heading northeast from the Elversstein.

The Elversstein is no. 29 in the system of checkpoints in the Harzer Wandernadel hiking network.

== See also ==
- List of rock formations in the Harz
