= Kaiser Wilhelm Tower =

Kaiser Wilhelm Tower or Emperor William Tower is the name of various observation towers, mostly in Germany, which are given that name, although some of them also have alternative names:

Extant Kaiser Wilhelm towers in Germany:

- Kaiser Wilhelm Tower (Bad Schmiedeberg), on the Schöne Aussicht in the Düben Heath, Bad Schmiedeberg, Wittenberg, Saxony-Anhalt
- Kaiser Wilhelm Tower (Eutin), on the Wilhelmshöhe by the Kellersee lake, Fissau (Eutin), Ostholstein, Schleswig-Holstein
- Kaiser Wilhelm Tower (Herne), water tower and observation tower on the Beimberg, Herne, North Rhine-Westphalia
- Kaiser Wilhelm Tower (Hohe Acht), on the Hohe Acht in the Eifel, near Adenau, Ahrweiler, Rhineland-Palatinate
- Kaiser Wilhelm Tower, in the Black Forest on the Hohloh, near Gernsbach, Rastatt, Baden-Württemberg – see Hohloh Tower
- Kaiser Wilhelm Tower (Holzminden), in Holzminden, Holzminden, Lower Saxony
- Kaiser Wilhelm Tower, on the Lahnberge in Marburg, Marburg-Biedenkopf, Hesse – see Spiegelslustturm (in German)
- Kaiser Wilhelm Tower (Neugattersleben), in the Schloss Park at Neugattersleben (Nienburg (Saale)), Salzlandkreis, Saxony-Anhalt
- Kaiser Wilhelm II Tower, on the Sackpfeife, near Hatzfeld, Waldeck-Frankenberg, Hesse
- Kaiser Wilhelm Tower (Schläferskopf), in the Taunus on the Schläferskopf, Wiesbaden-Klarenthal, Hesse
- Kaiser Wilhelm Tower, in the Harz on the Armeleuteberg, near Wernigerode, Harz, Saxony-Anhalt – see Kaiser Tower (Wernigerode)

Non-preserved Kaiser Wilhelm towers:

- Kaiser Wilhelm I Tower, on the Carlsberg in Danzig-Oliva, Poland
- Kaiser Wilhelm Tower (Essen), in Stoppenberg, Essen, North Rhine-Westphalia
- Kaiser Wilhelm I Tower, in Silesian Meffersdorf, today Pobiedna, Poland

Kaiser Wilhelm towers that have since been renamed or rededicated:

- Fuchsturm (Gera), on the Fuchsberg in Debschwitz, Gera, Thuringia
- Grunewald Tower, on the Karlsberg in Berlin-Grunewald
- Österberg Tower, on the Österberg in Tübingen, Baden-Württemberg
- Wilhelm Raabe Tower, in the Harz on the Eichenberg, near Blankenburg, Harz, Saxony-Anhalt
- Wolfert Tower, in the Wolfertanlage in Ehingen, Alb-Donau-Kreis, Baden-Württemberg

== See also ==
- Kaiser tower
- Emperor William monument
