= Emperor William monuments =

Monuments build for German Emperor Wilhelm I

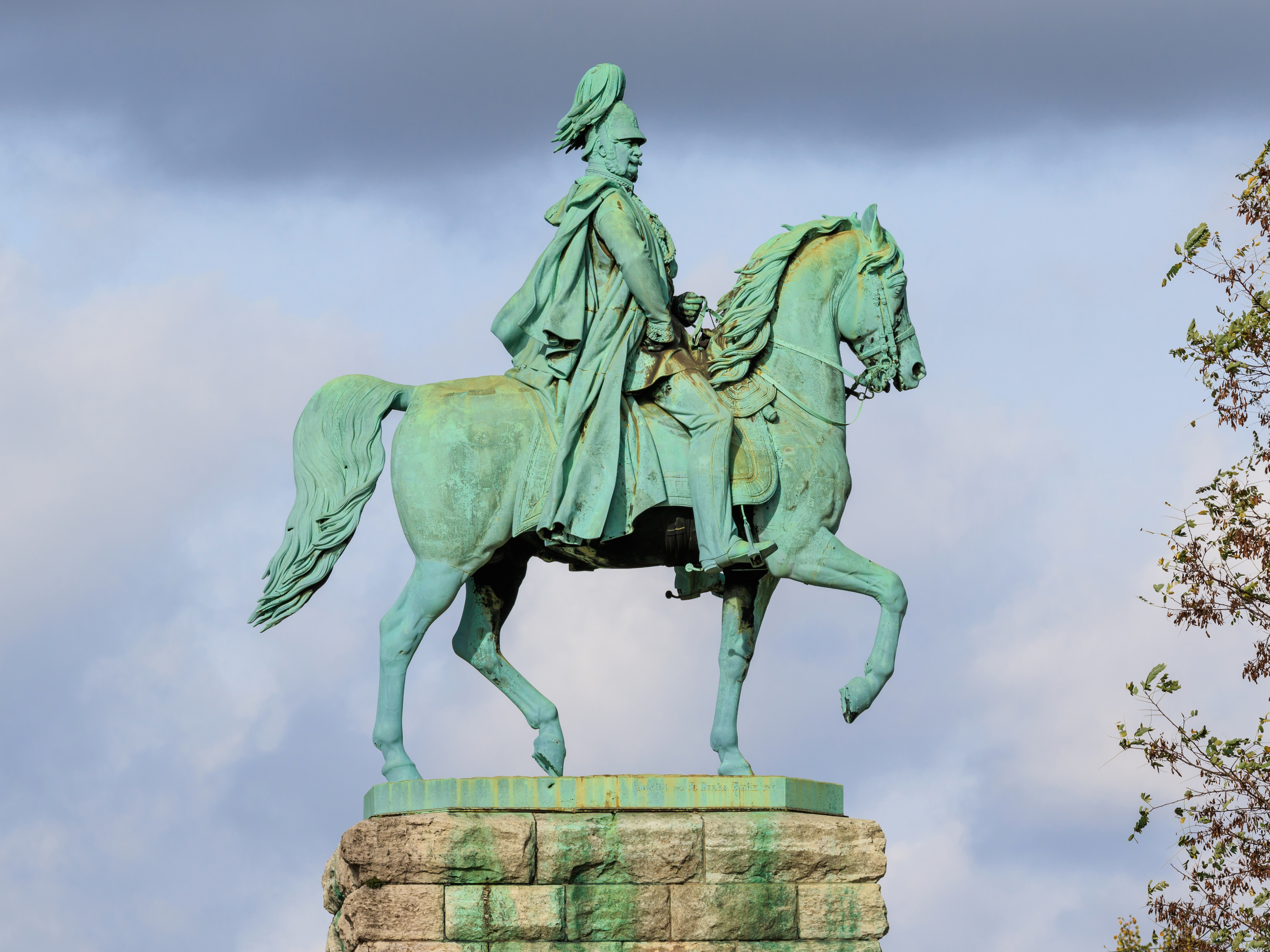
Monument on the Hohenzollern Bridge in Cologne

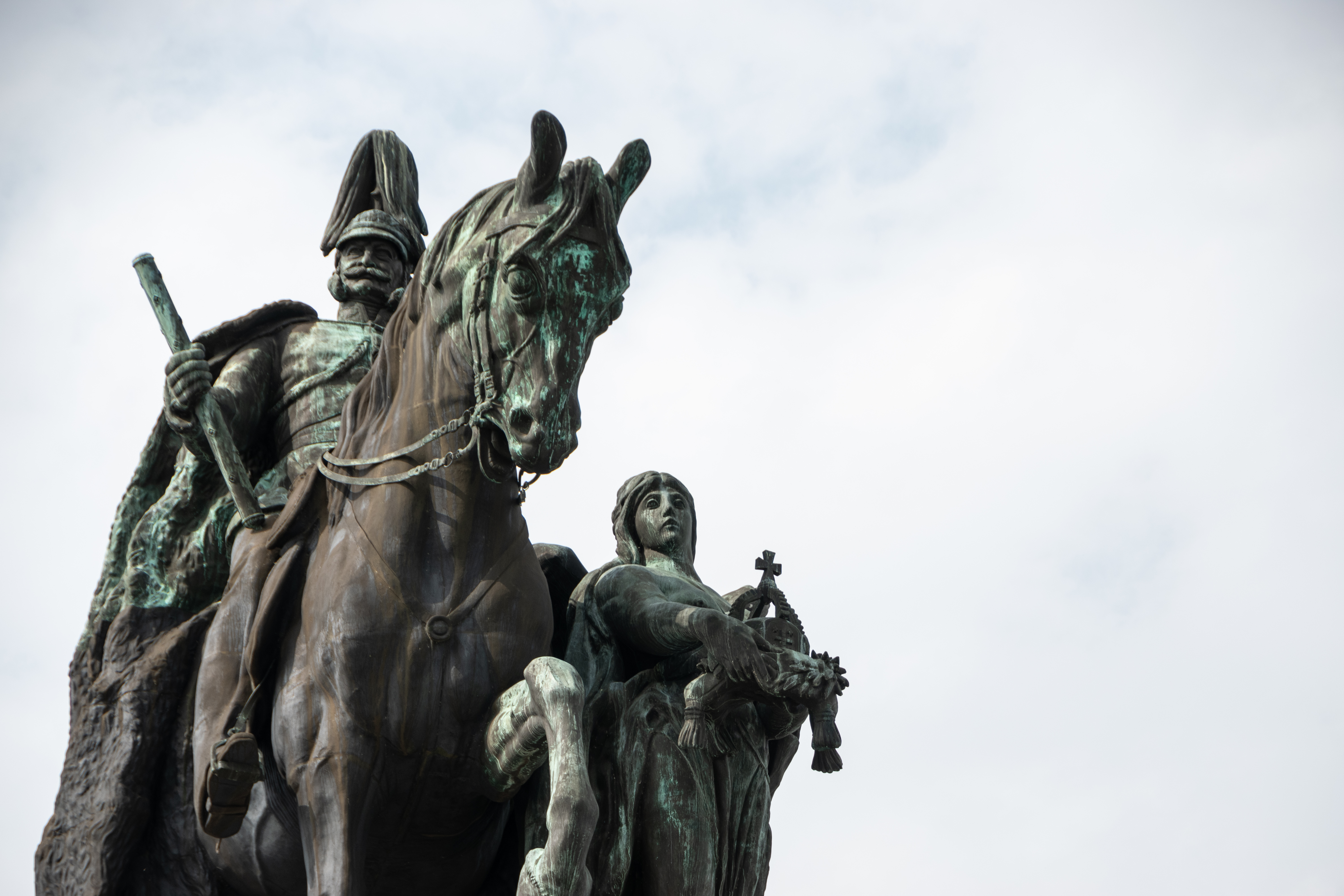
Monument at the Deutsches Eck, Koblenz

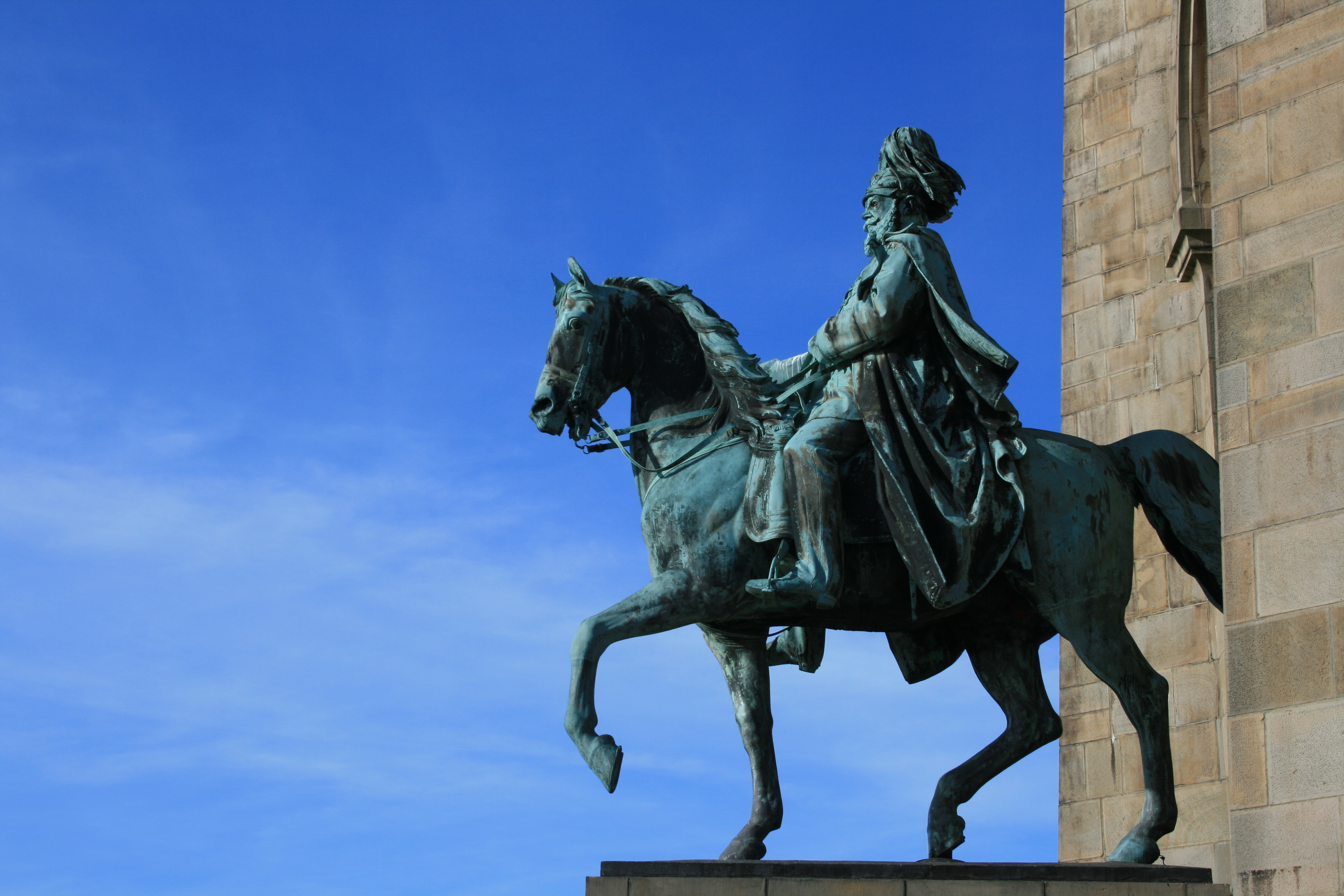
Emperor William monument in Dortmund-Hohensyburg

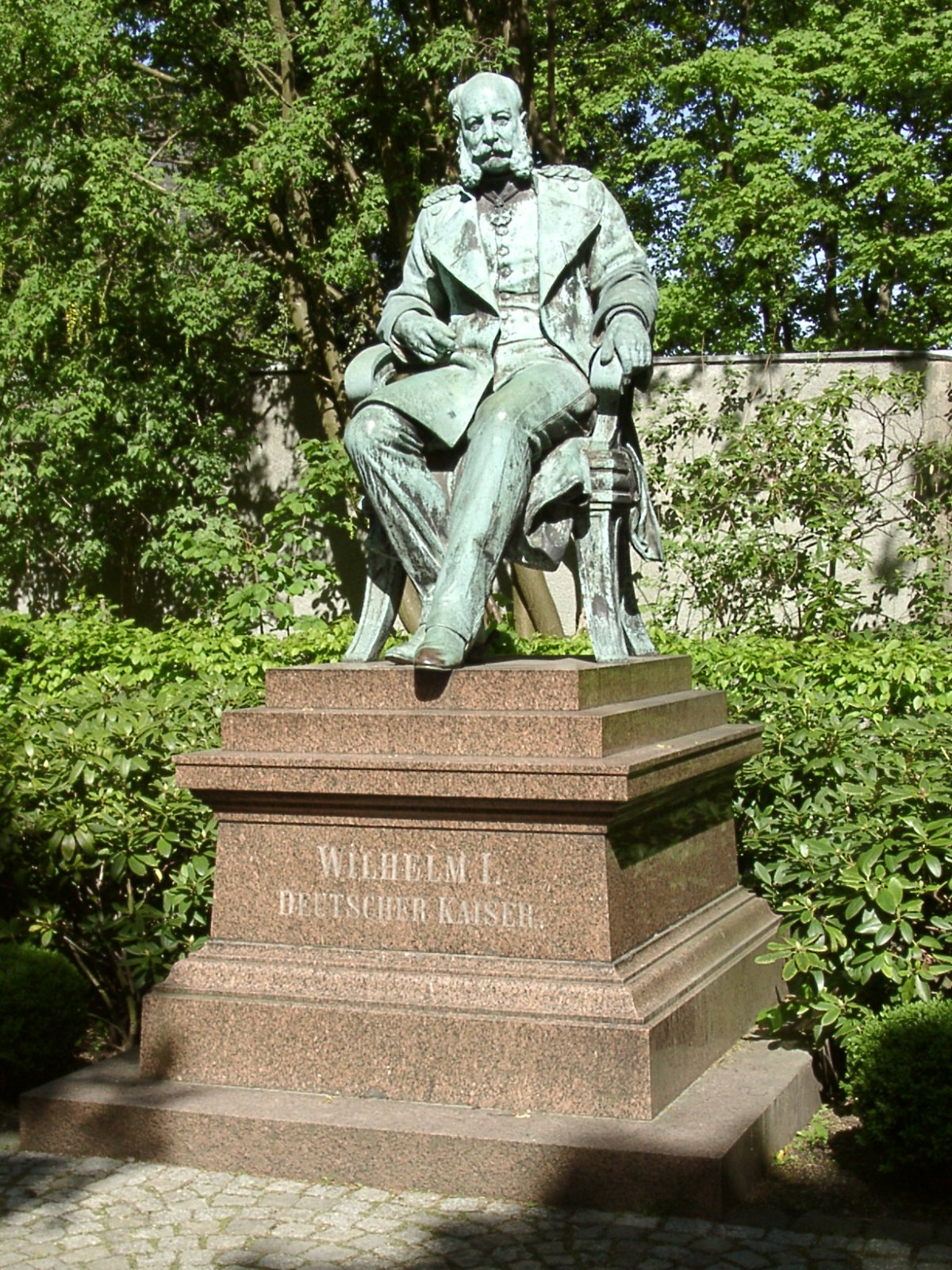
Statue of Emperor William, seated, in Dortmund's Westfalenpark

A large number of Emperor William monuments or Kaiser Wilhelm monuments were erected in Germany in honour of Emperor William I (Kaiser Wilhelm in German). As early as 1867 the Berlin sculptor Friedrich Drake had created the first equestrian statue portraying William I as the King of Prussia. To date the Prussian Monument Institute (Preußisches Denkmal-Institut) has recorded:

- 63 equestrian statues
- 231 standing statues
- 5 seated statues and
- 126 busts

that were created and erected between 1888 and 1918 in the German-speaking region. Additionally there are numerous William I monuments in which the emperor is portrayed in a relief medallion or which commemorate the emperor in a dedicatory inscription. During the period of the German Empire, 28 Emperor William I towers were also built.

There are also some monuments honouring his grandson, William II (27 January 1859 – 4 June 1941), who was German Emperor from June 1888 until his forced and unwanted abdication at the end of the First World War in November 1918. These include two equestrian statues: a free-standing monument on the Hohenzollern Bridge in Cologne and a 3/4-scale relief in the Elberfeld district of Wuppertal.

== History ==
William I (22 March 1797 – 9 March 1888) was King of Prussia from 2 January 1861 until his death and in addition was proclaimed German Emperor on 18 January 1871 during the Franco-Prussian War on the initiative of Bismarck. It was customary in Prussia not to erect monuments to living monarchs. Moreover, before official monuments could be erected to members of the royal house, a so-called "sovereign approval" had to be sought. As a result, almost all Emperor William monuments appeared only after the Emperor's death in March 1888 (and there are few monuments to the last German Emperor, William II).

Emperor William monuments were mainly erected in Prussia and, outside Prussia, in larger cities, usually on the initiative of private individuals. The organisation of finance, tendering, planning and unveiling was carried out by memorial committees that were dissolved after completion of the monument.

The best known surviving Emperor William monuments today are the 81-metre-high Kyffhäuser Monument (1890–1896), the Emperor William Monument at Porta Westfalica, unveiled in 1896, and the monument at the Deutsches Eck in Koblenz, erected in 1897. All three were designed by Berlin architect Bruno Schmitz.

The Emperor William National Monument in front of the Berlin Palace was unveiled in 1897. It was removed in 1950 along with the palace.

The oldest surviving monument to William I, an equestrian statue portraying him as King of Prussia, was created in 1867 by the Berlin sculptor Friedrich Drake. It stands at the bridgehead of Cologne's Hohenzollern Bridge (right bank, i.e. on the Deutz side).

The only monument showing Emperor William I in civilian clothes stands in the spa park at Bad Ems. It was unveiled on 7 May 1893 and portrays the monarch as people saw him when he was visiting the spa in the town.

One of the 231 statues of Emperor William I was unveiled in 1894 in Wiesbaden and stands in the Warmer Damm. The monument, with a height of 6.8 metres, was created by the Dresden sculptor Johannes Schilling and bears the inscription "The grateful city of Wiesbaden" on its base.

The last official monument to William I was an equestrian statue intended to be placed in Lübeck: the authorization and contract award were issued in 1914, but although the die was ready for casting, no bronze was available because of the First World War. So the statue was only completed in 1919.

== Gallery ==
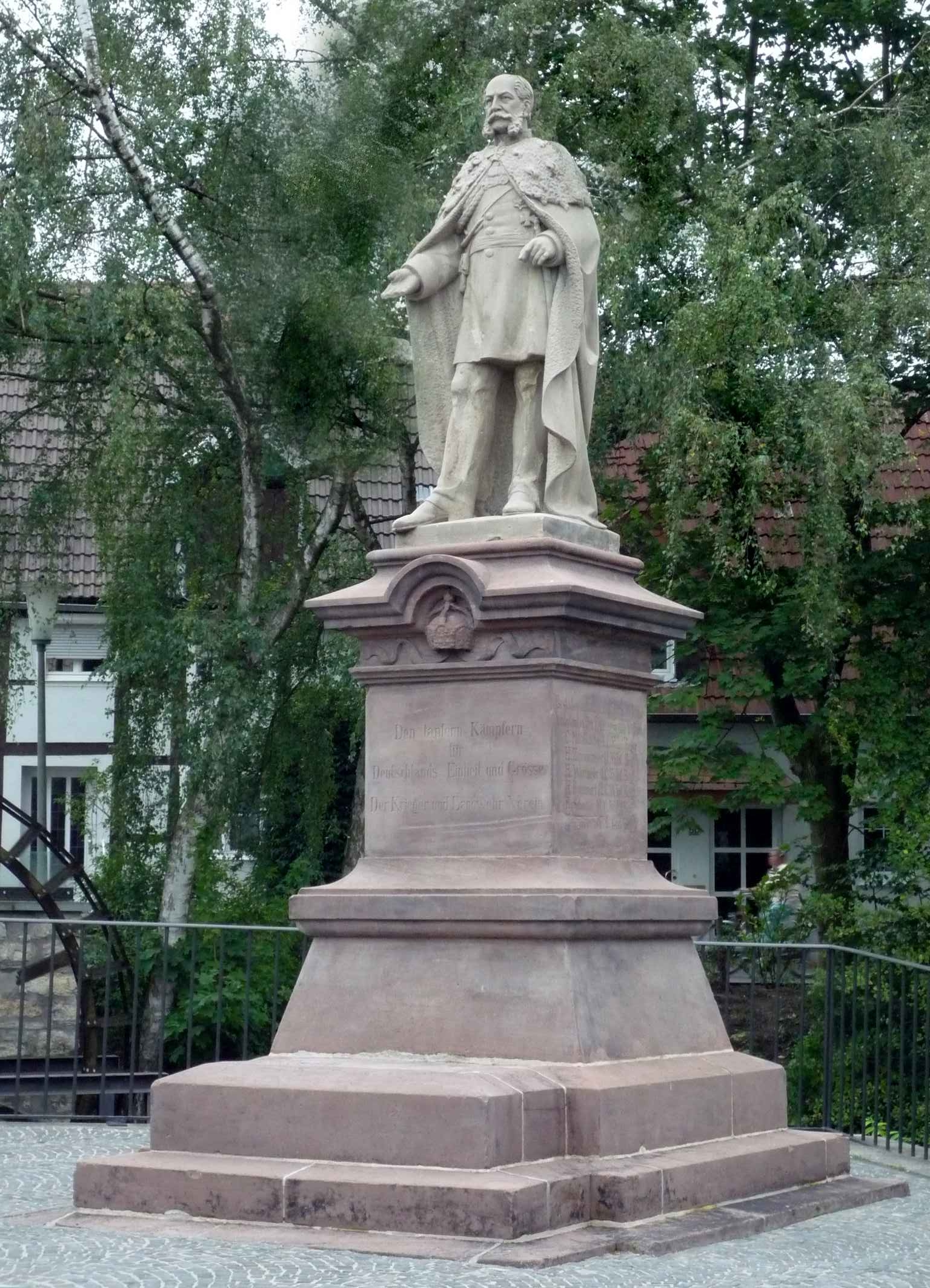
William I statue in Rheda-Wiedenbrück, commemorating the wars of 1864, 1866 and 1870–71

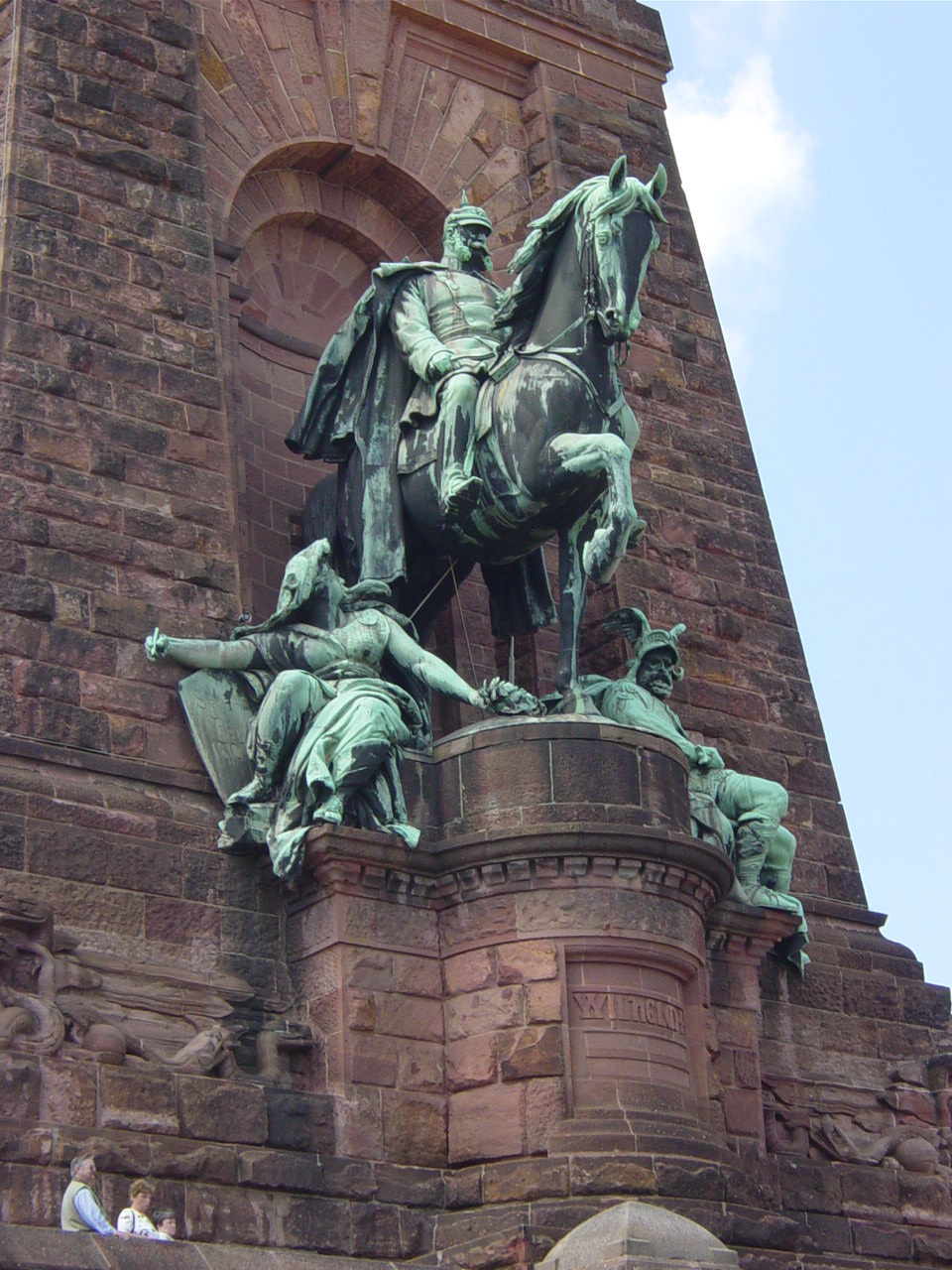
Statue of William I as part of the Kyffhäuser Monument

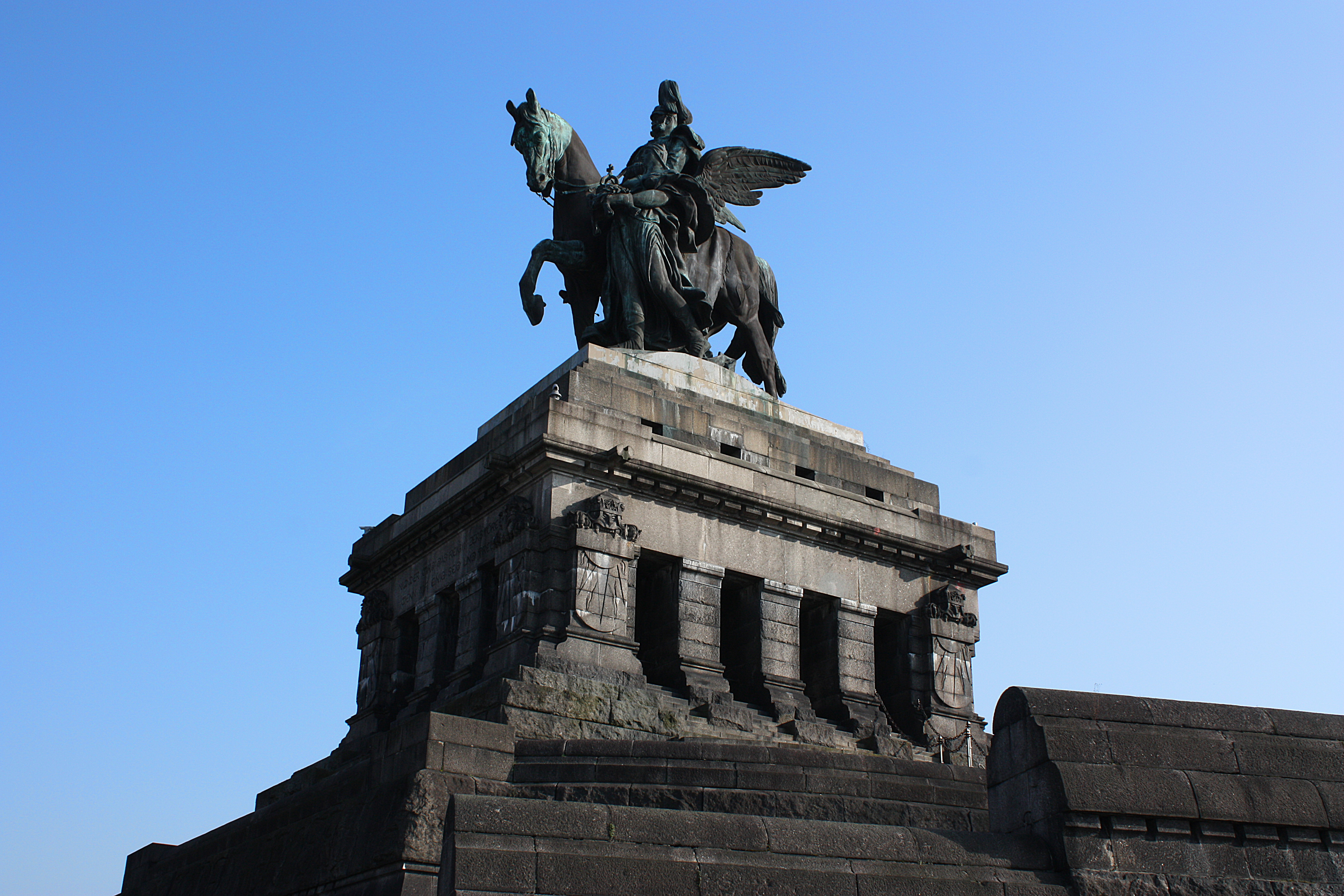
Monument at the Deutsches Eck in Koblenz

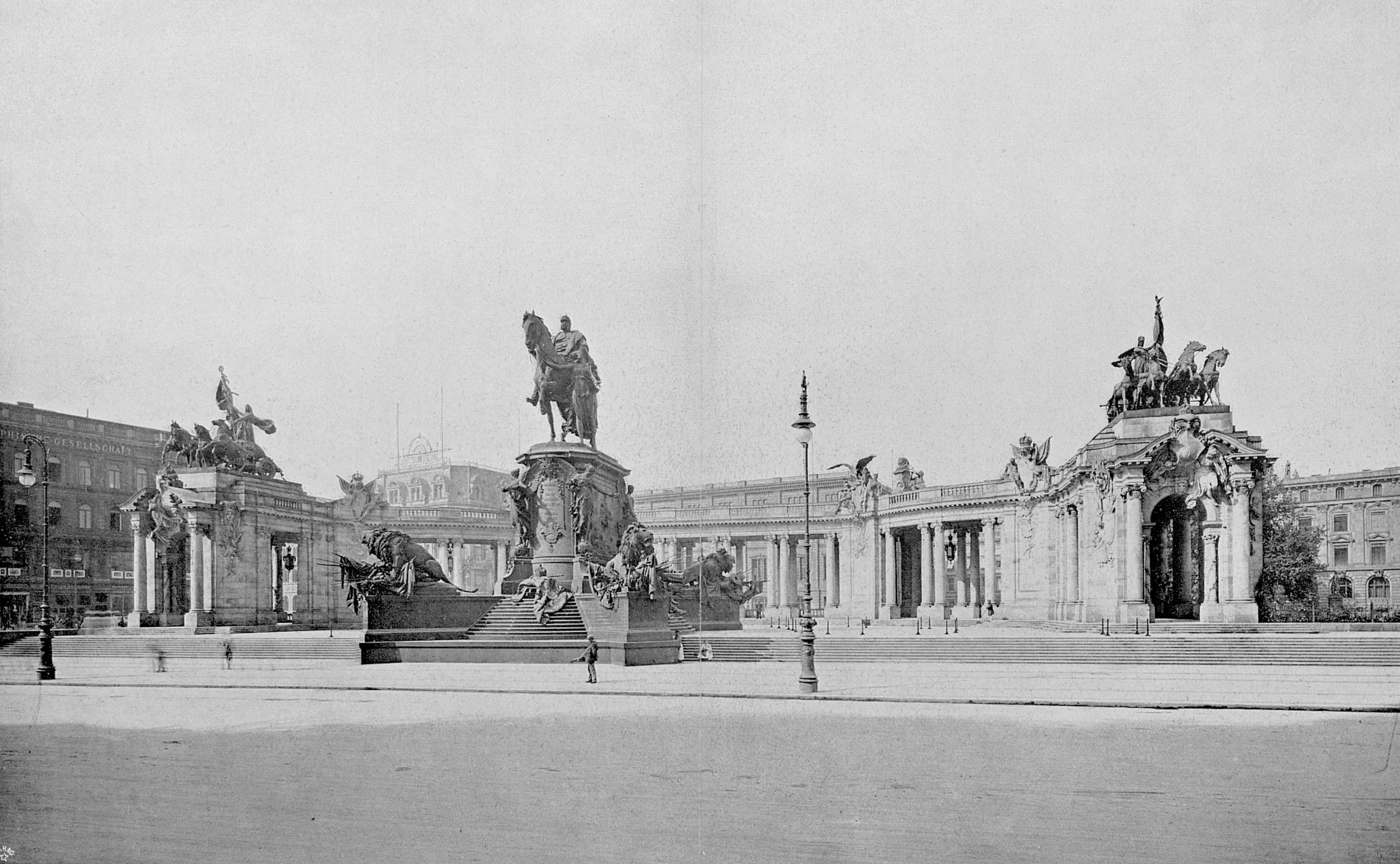
Emperor William National Monument in Berlin, 1901. It was removed in 1950.

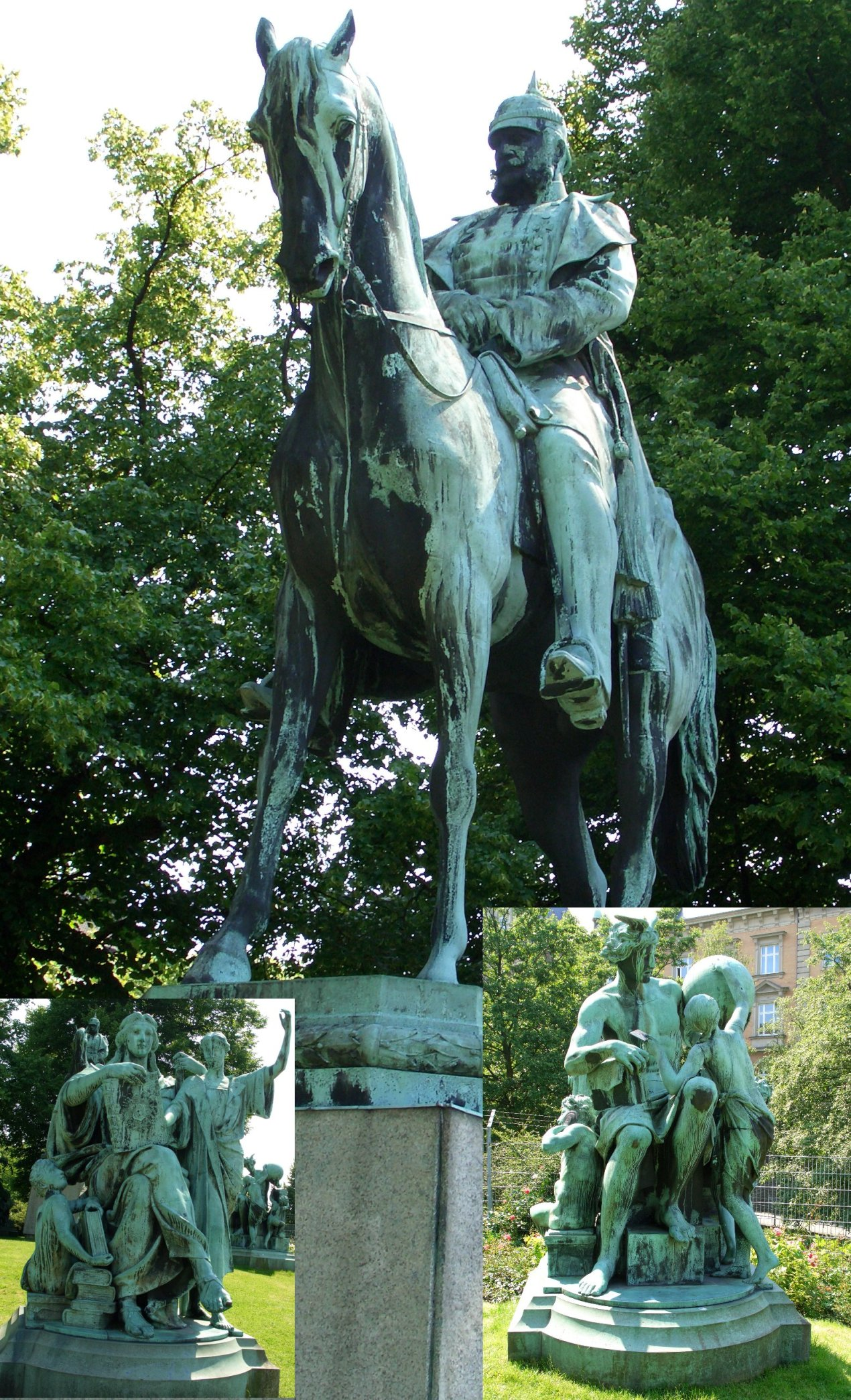
Monument by Johannes Schilling now at Planten un Blomen, Hamburg

== See also ==
- Bismarck monuments
- Kaiser towers
- Kaiser Wilhelm Tower
