= Wilhelm Raabe Tower =

Coordinates: 51°47′33″N 10°55′46″E

The Wilhelm Raabe Tower (German: Wilhelm-Raabe-Warte) is one of the few surviving Kaiser towers (Kaiserwarten). It is located on the Eichenberg hill near Blankenburg on the edge of the Harz Mountains of central Germany. It is owned by the Harz Club branch in Blankenburg. It was built in 1896 in honour of Wilhelm II, the German emperor and King of Prussia and is one of the few surviving Emperor Towers.

== History of the tower ==
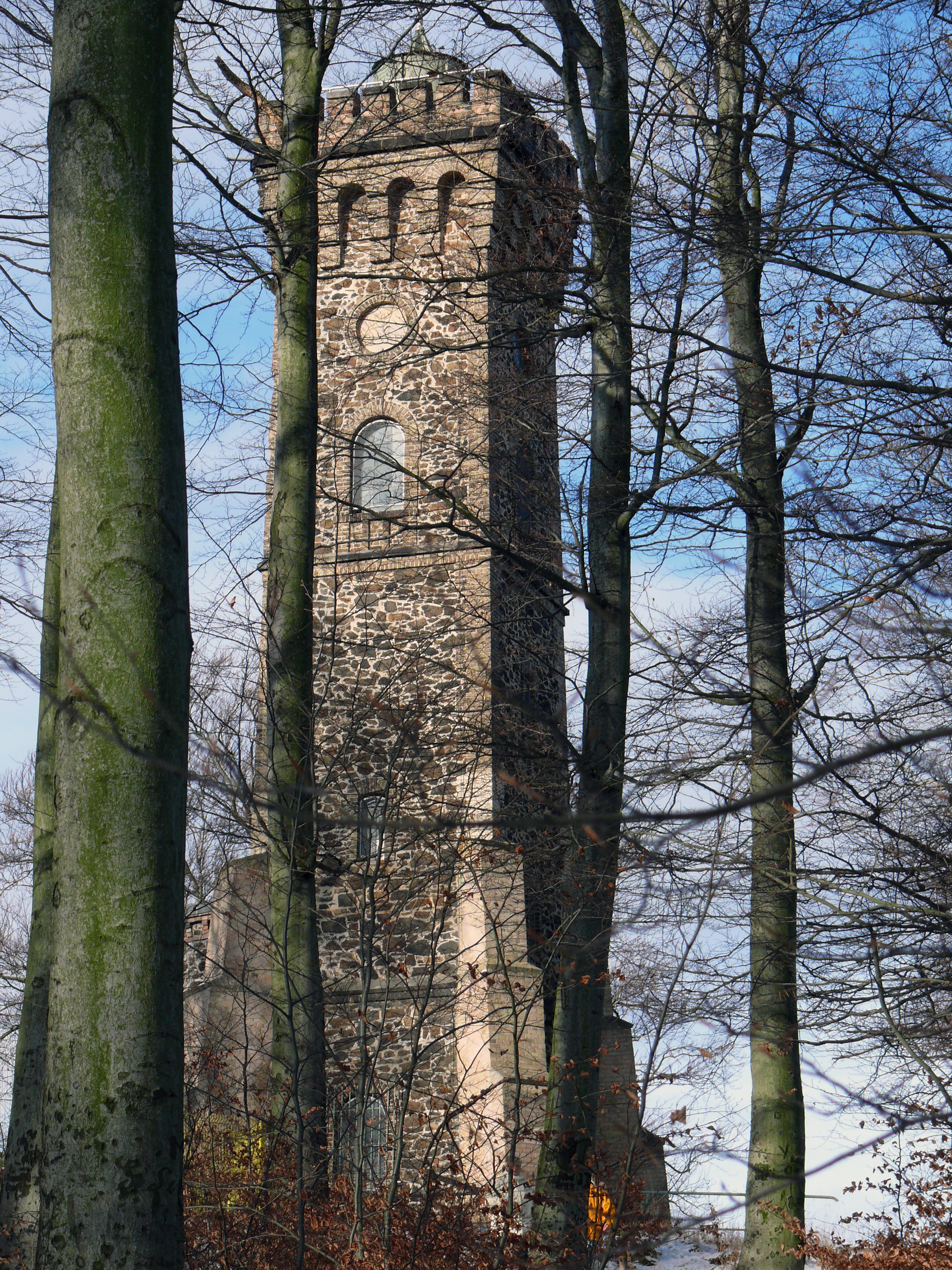
Wilhelm Raabe Tower

The first idea for building this observation tower emerged in November 1894. At the end of 1895 the decision was made to go ahead and the foundation stone was laid on 22 March of the following year. The ceremonial opening of the imperial tower took place on 9 September 1896.

In 1921 extensive repairs were carried out on the tower. In addition a wooden hut was built for providing food and refreshments. However between 1922 and 1950 there was only a minimal service which was interrupted from time to time.

After the Second World War further repairs to the tower were undertaken on the initiative of the Blankenburg's Harz Club members, and financially supported by the daughter of Emperor Wilhelms II, Duchess Victoria Luisa. In 1950 it was renamed the "Wilhelm Raabe Tower" in honour of the writer Wilhelm Raabe. As the wooden shack had been destroyed, the firm of Karl Hildebrandt (architects in Blankenburg) took on the construction of a solid wooden hut to act as a restaurant. This was opened on 10 July 1954. In the course of the construction of the Wilhelm-Raabe-Warte' restaurant a further renovation of the observation tower ensued in 1976. The restaurant was operated from 1978 to 1992.

On 19 February 1996 the Blankenburg branch of the Harz Club decided to buy the site and the Wilhelm Raabe Tower itself. Almost 7 months later, on 15 September 1996, the tower was opened to the public.

Next to the tower is the derelict building of the old inn. It is planned to open a hiker's inn here with overnight accommodation.

== Technical data ==
- Height of tower from the parapet: 21.60 m

Platform area: 20.50 m

- Steps: 106 (41 metal, 44 wood, 21 stone)
- Constructed: 22 March ‒ 2 September 1896
- Height of the Eichenberg hill: 416 m above NN

In excellent visibility the range of view is up to 70–75 km.

== See also ==
- Kaiser William Tower
