= Deutsches Eck =

Historical site in Koblenz, Rhineland-Palatinate, Germany

Coordinates: 50.3645°N 7.606°E

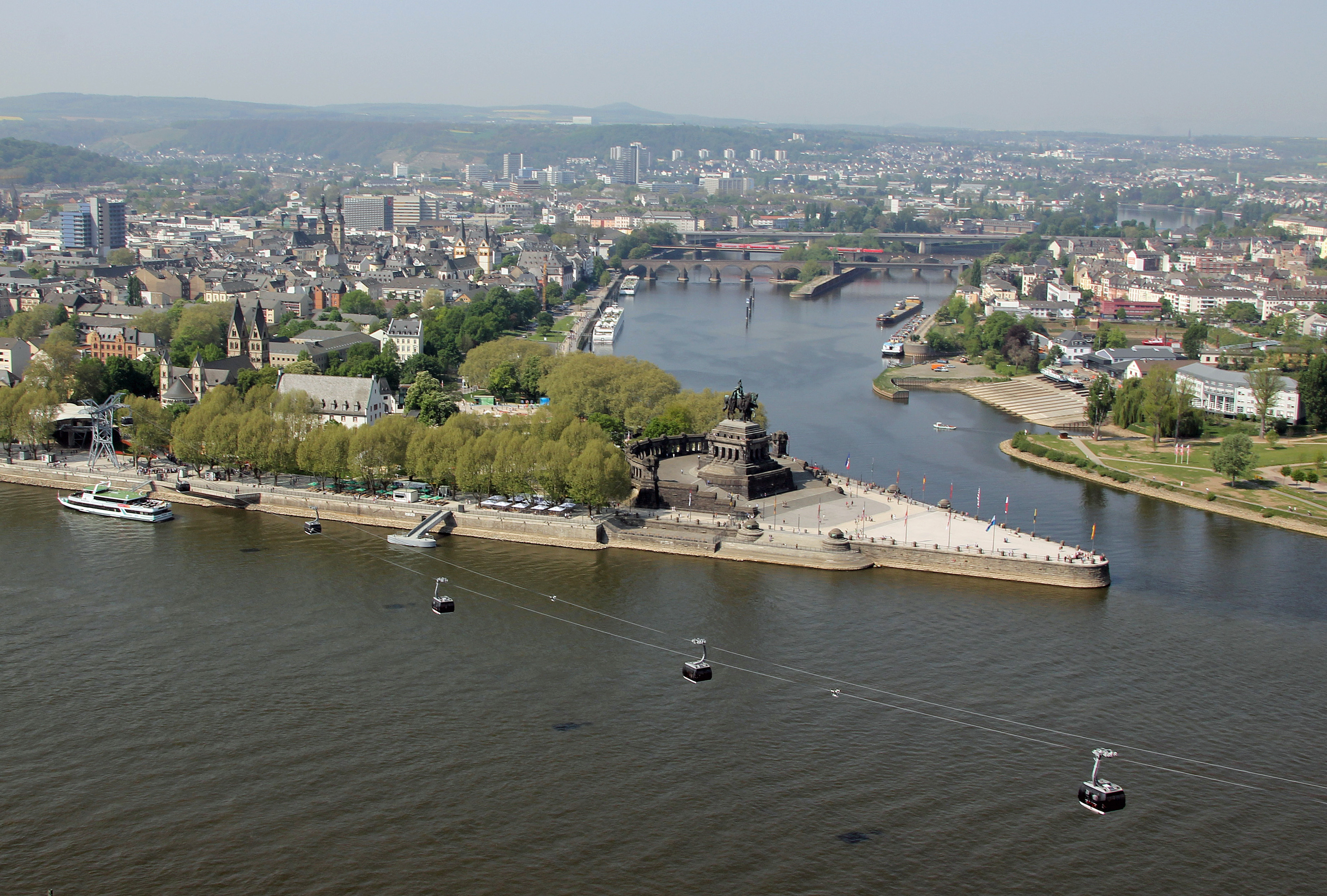
View of the Deutsches Eck from Ehrenbreitstein, showing the Koblenz Cableway

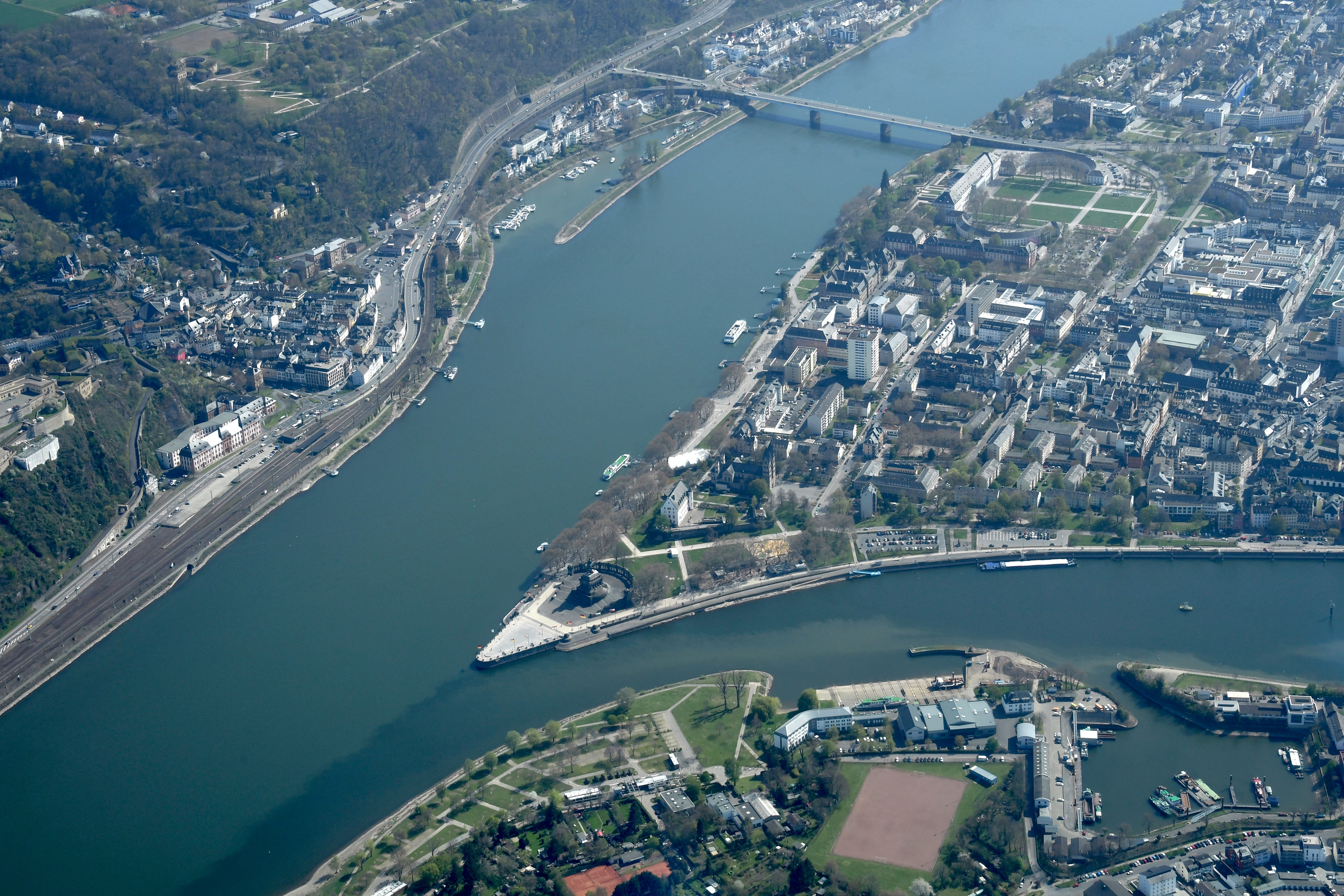
Aerial view of the confluence

The Deutsches Eck (German: [ˈdɔʏtʃəs ˈʔɛk], "German Point") is the name of a promontory in Koblenz, Germany, where the Mosel river joins the Rhine. Named after a local commandry of the Teutonic Order, it became known for a monumental equestrian statue of William I, first German Emperor, dedicated in 1897 in appreciation of his role in the unification of Germany. One of many Emperor William monuments raised in the Prussian Rhine Province, it was dismantled on the orders of the French military government immediately after the Second World War, and only the plinth was preserved as a memorial. Following German reunification, a replica of the statue was erected on the pedestal after controversial discussions in 1993. It is today a Koblenz landmark and a popular tourist attraction.

== History ==
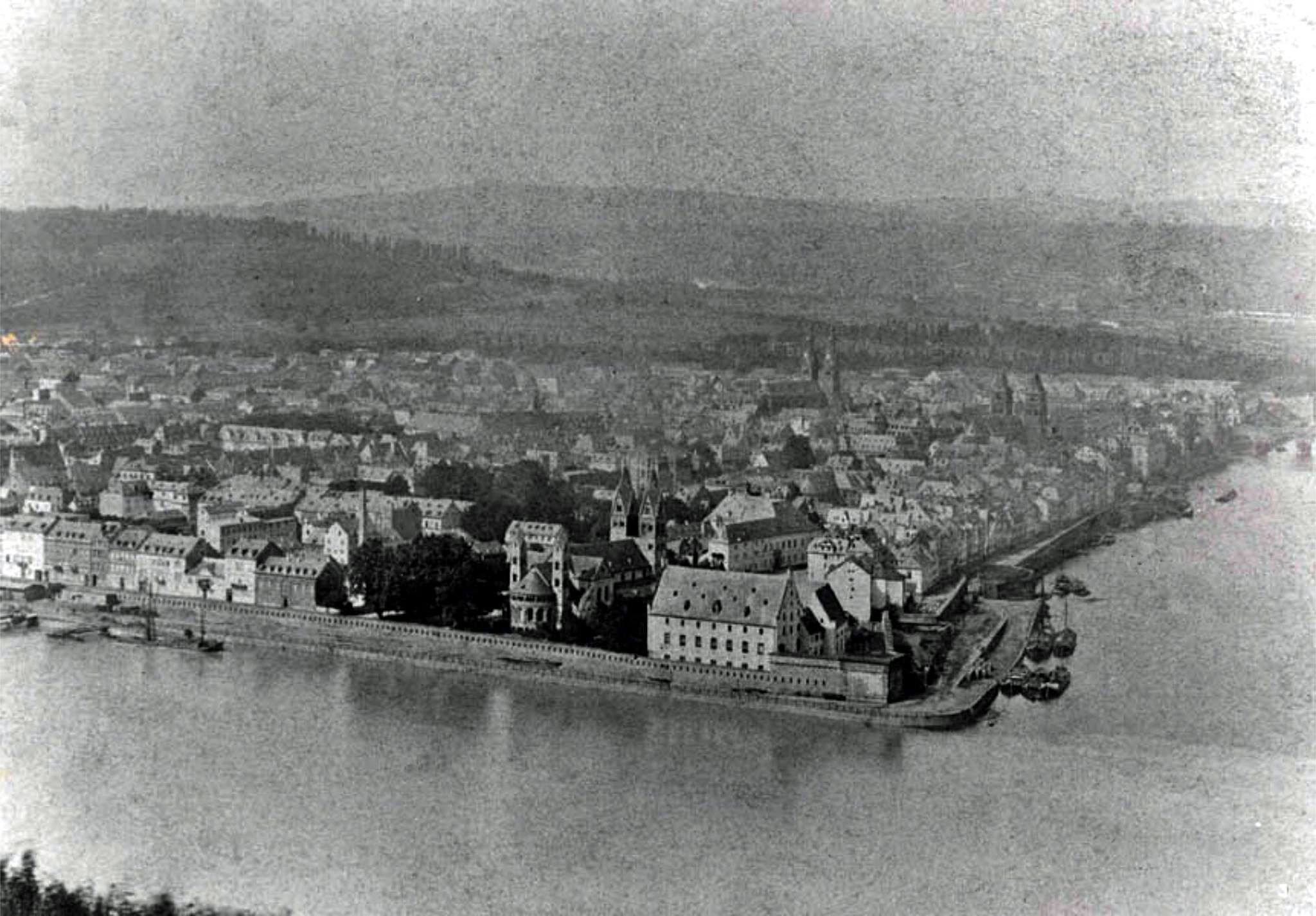
View of the Deutsches Eck, c. 1875, showing St. Castor's Basilica and the Deutschherrenhaus

The Teutonic Knights were called to Koblenz by the Archbishop of Trier in 1216 and vested with estates around the Basilica of St. Castor at the confluence of the Mosel and the Rhine. Serving mainly in nursing care, the knights soon after established a commandry here, which became the administrative seat of the Koblenz bailiwick directly subordinate to the Grand Master. The premises centred on the Deutschherrenhaus building were erected from 1279 onwards and became known as the Deutsches Eck.

In about 1600, the Koblenz commander moved his seat further down the Rhine to Cologne. In 1794 the Left Bank of the Rhine was conquered by French revolutionary troops and the ecclesiastical estates secularised from 1802 onwards. The Order's premises were refurbished as part of the Prussian Koblenz Fortress. Later in the 19th century, the area was linked by a pier with a downstream sandbank creating the present-day promontory.

=== Imperial iconography ===
After the death of Emperor William I in 1888, his grandson William II wished to spark a nationalist cult around the "founder of the German Reich". In the following years the privately funded Kyffhäuser Monument was erected and an Emperor William Monument was inaugurated in Porta Westfalica, both designed by the Leipzig architect Bruno Schmitz. Several other cities had also applied as installation sites and in 1891 William II decided upon the confluence of the Rhine and Mosel rivers at Koblenz.

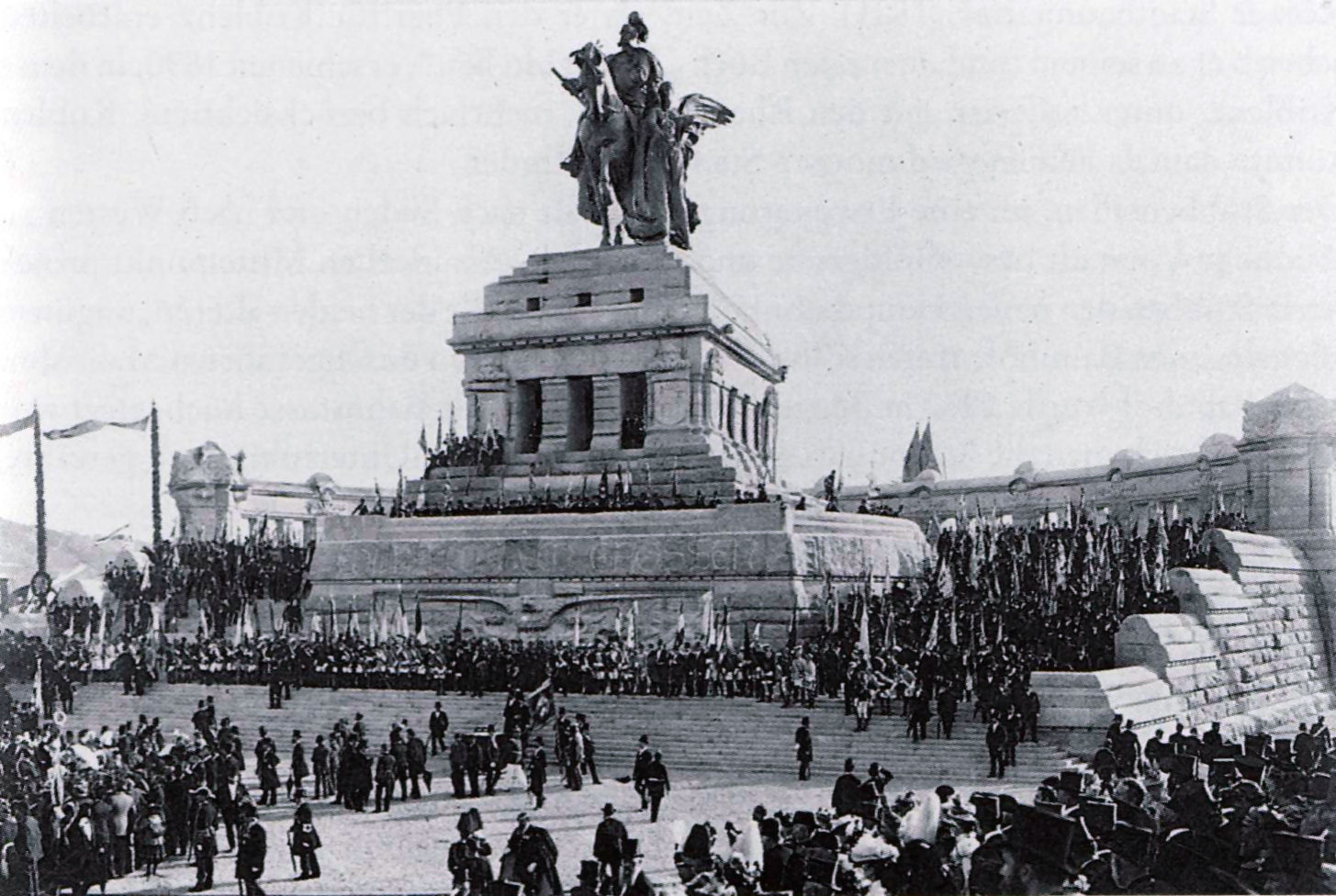
Inauguration ceremony, 31 August 1897

After further landfills at the site and a large-scale collection campaign, the official "Emperor William Monument of the Rhine Province" was erected and solemnly inaugurated in the presence of the emperor on 31 August 1897. Bruno Schmitz again had drawn up the plans for a giant, over 37 metres (121 ft) high monument installed at the tip of the Deutsches Eck, bearing an inscription quoting a verse by the Koblenz poet Max von Schenkendorf: Nimmer wird das Reich zerstöret, wenn ihr einig seid und treu ("Never will the Empire be destroyed, so long as you are united and loyal"). Another inscription could be found at the statue dedicating it to Wilhelm der Große ("William the Great"). The equestrian statue itself, 14 m (46 ft) in height, presented William I in a general's uniform, reminiscent of the Prussian victories in the "German Wars of Unification". His horse is roped by a winged female genius bearing a laurel wreath and the Imperial Crown.

After World War I under the terms of the Treaty of Versailles, the Rhine Province was occupied by Allied forces. When in November 1929 the area was finally cleared according to the Young Plan, tens of thousands gathered at the Deutsches Eck to celebrate the "liberation of the Rhineland". On 22 July 1930 Reich President Paul von Hindenburg celebrated the completion of his triumphal journey through the Rhenish lands here with a festive banquet and a firework display. Later in the same evening, 38 people were killed when a pontoon bridge across the Mosel collapsed under the weight of the crowds.

=== Demolition ===
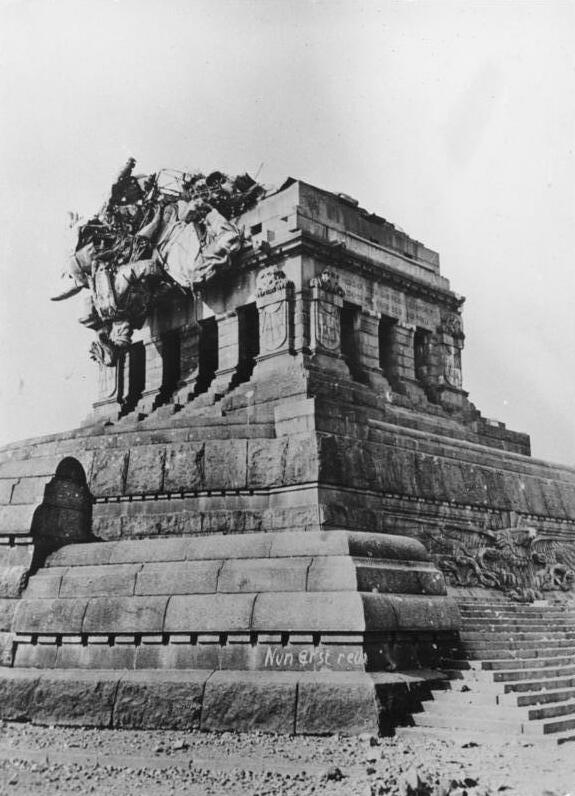
The statue in ruins, 1945

While the inner city of Koblenz was hit hard by Allied strategic bombing during World War II, the Deutsches Eck remained largely unscathed. However, the statue was later badly damaged by American artillery. Soon afterwards it was completely taken down. The French military government planned to replace the old memorial with a monument for peace and understanding among nations, but that concept was never realized.

After the formation of the Federal Republic of Germany and the German Democratic Republic in 1949, the country was divided into a capitalist west and a communist east. In order to express the deep wish for a united Germany, President Theodor Heuss turned the German Point into a monument to German unity. As a result, the coats of arms of all German Länder (states), including those of former German territories such as Silesia, East Prussia and Pomerania, were installed. Replacing the destroyed equestrian statue, a German flag flew over the plaza.

After the Berlin Wall came down in November 1989, three concrete parts of the actual wall were installed next to the monument. On 3 October 1990, the emblems of the new federal states were added.

=== Reinstallation ===
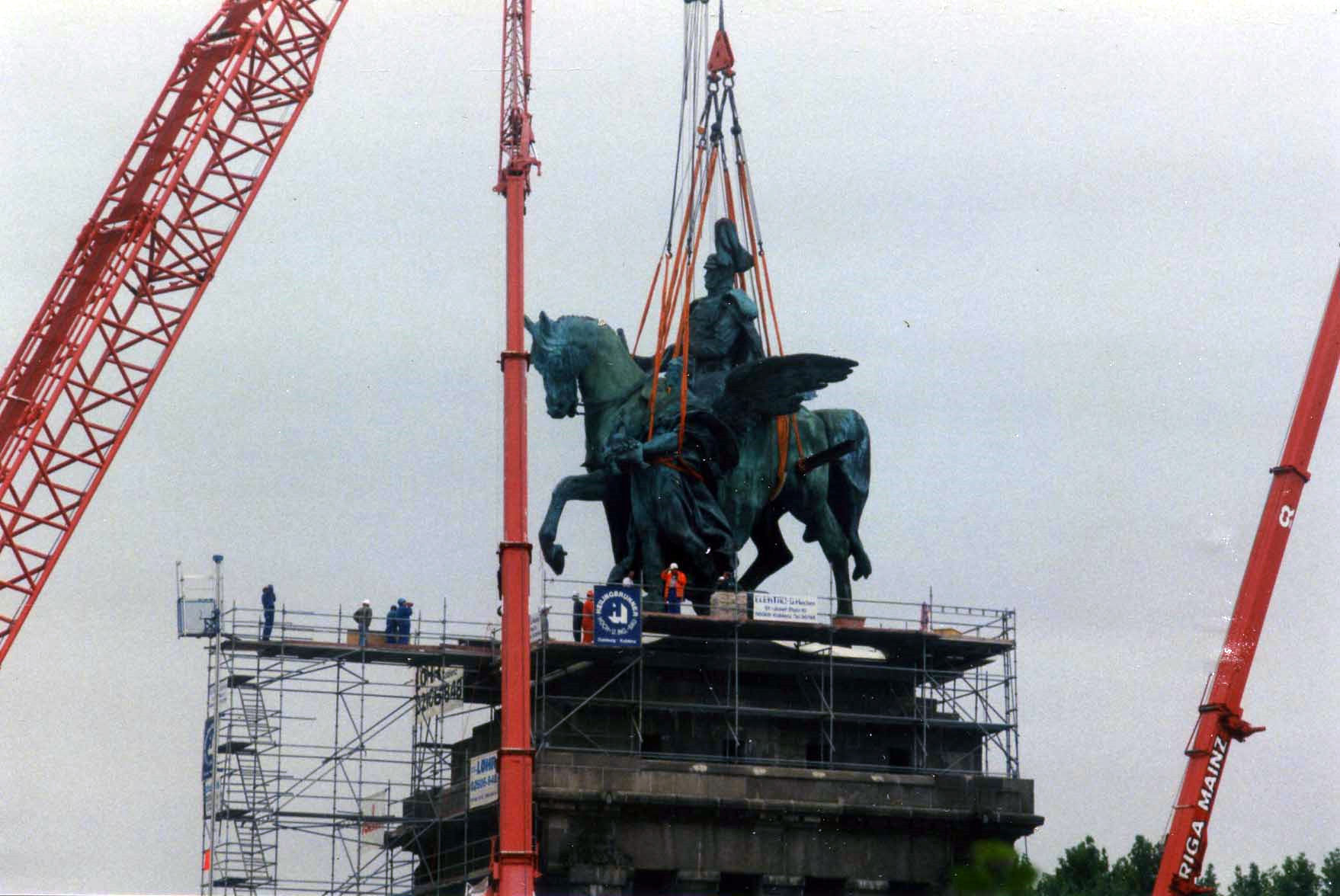
The replacement statue being hoisted onto the base

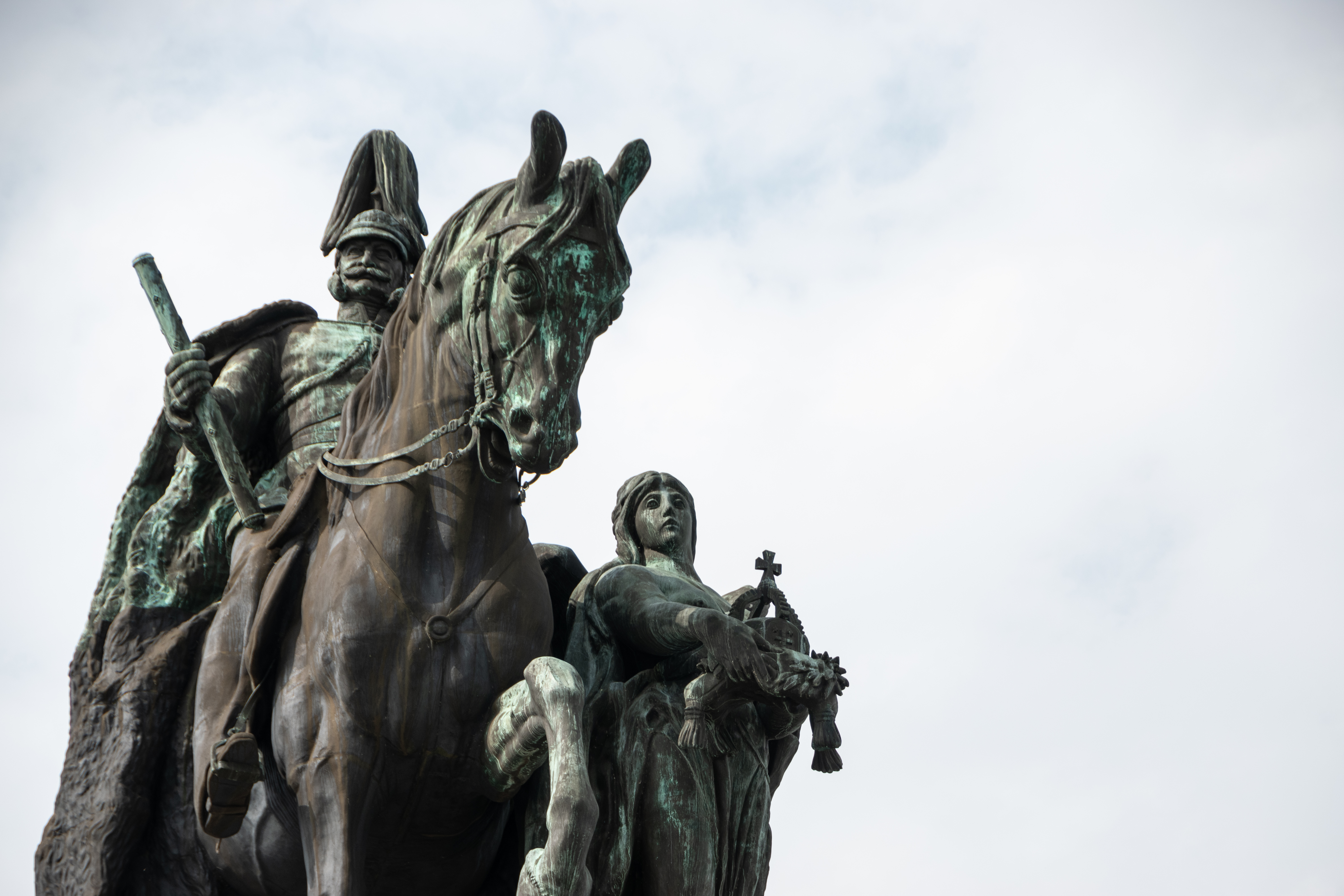
Replacement statue in 2025

A passenger ship deftly steers round the Deutsches Eck.

With German Reunification in 1990, the Deutsches Eck no longer served as a symbol of the aspiration for a united Germany. Thus, a discussion arose regarding a remodelling of the plaza. Critics considered the reinstallation of the equestrian statue of Wilhelm I as anachronistic and improper, whereas promoters saw the opportunity for tourist benefits. As the owner of the site, any decision to reinstall a statue of Wilhelm I rested with the government of the Rhineland-Palatinate. However, the state government transferred its rights to the city of Koblenz. When Werner Theisen, a former newspaper publisher from Koblenz, and his wife Anneliese, announced that they would bear all costs for a reconstruction of the statue, the decision was made to proceed with it.

The Düsseldorf sculptor Raymond Kittl was commissioned to produce a replica of the original sculpture and the remodelled statue was created from durable bronze cast, unlike the original which had been made from copper plates. In May 1992, the parts of the statue were brought to Koblenz on board the MS Futura. The assembly work was completed at the port and on 2 September 1993 a mobile lattice boom crawler crane lifted the statue onto the base. The installation took place on Sedan Day, which although no longer officially recognized, was the day on which the German victory in the Battle of Sedan was commemorated. On 25 September 1993, the new statue was inaugurated.

Today, a big national flag and the flags of the 16 Länder fly at the Deutsches Eck as a reminder of German unity. In addition, the flag of the European Union and the flag of the United States of America, which is displayed as a sign of support for the victims of the September 11 attacks. The three parts of the Berlin Wall are now dedicated to the "victims of the division".

== Image gallery ==
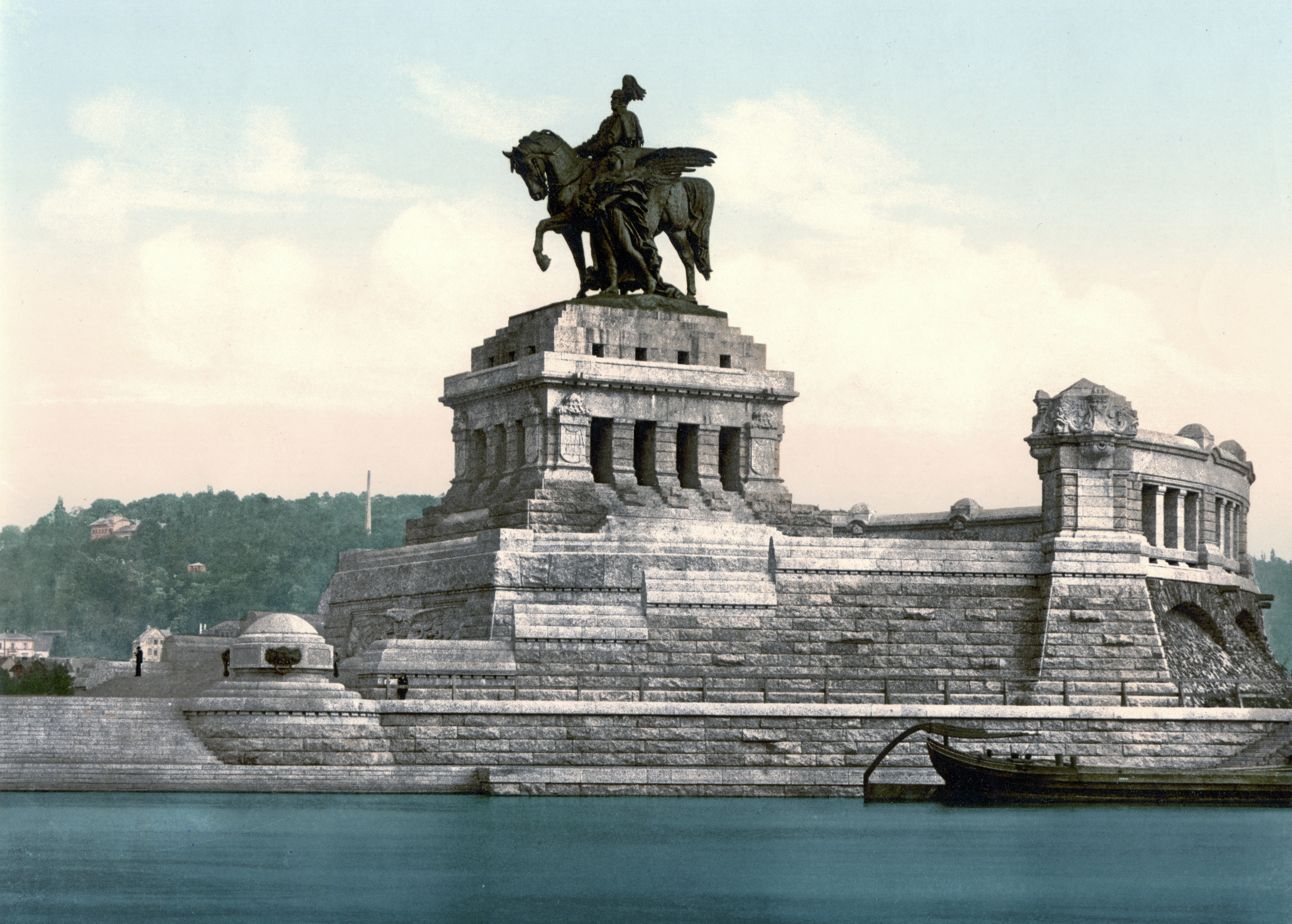
The Deutsches Eck, c. 1900

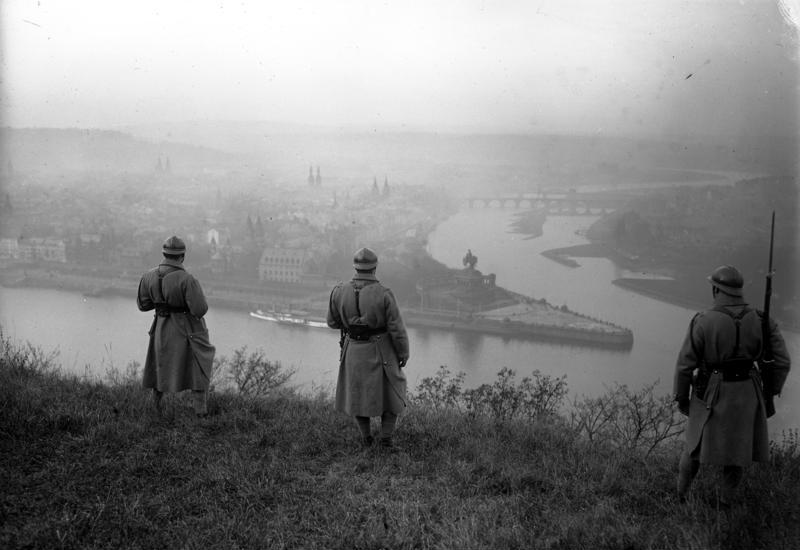
French soldiers at the Deutsches Eck during the Occupation of the Rhineland

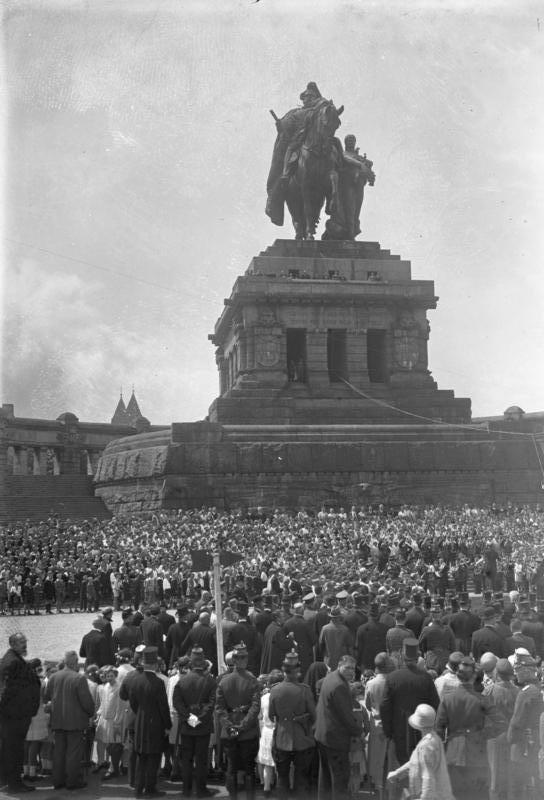
President Hindenburg visits the Deutsches Eck.

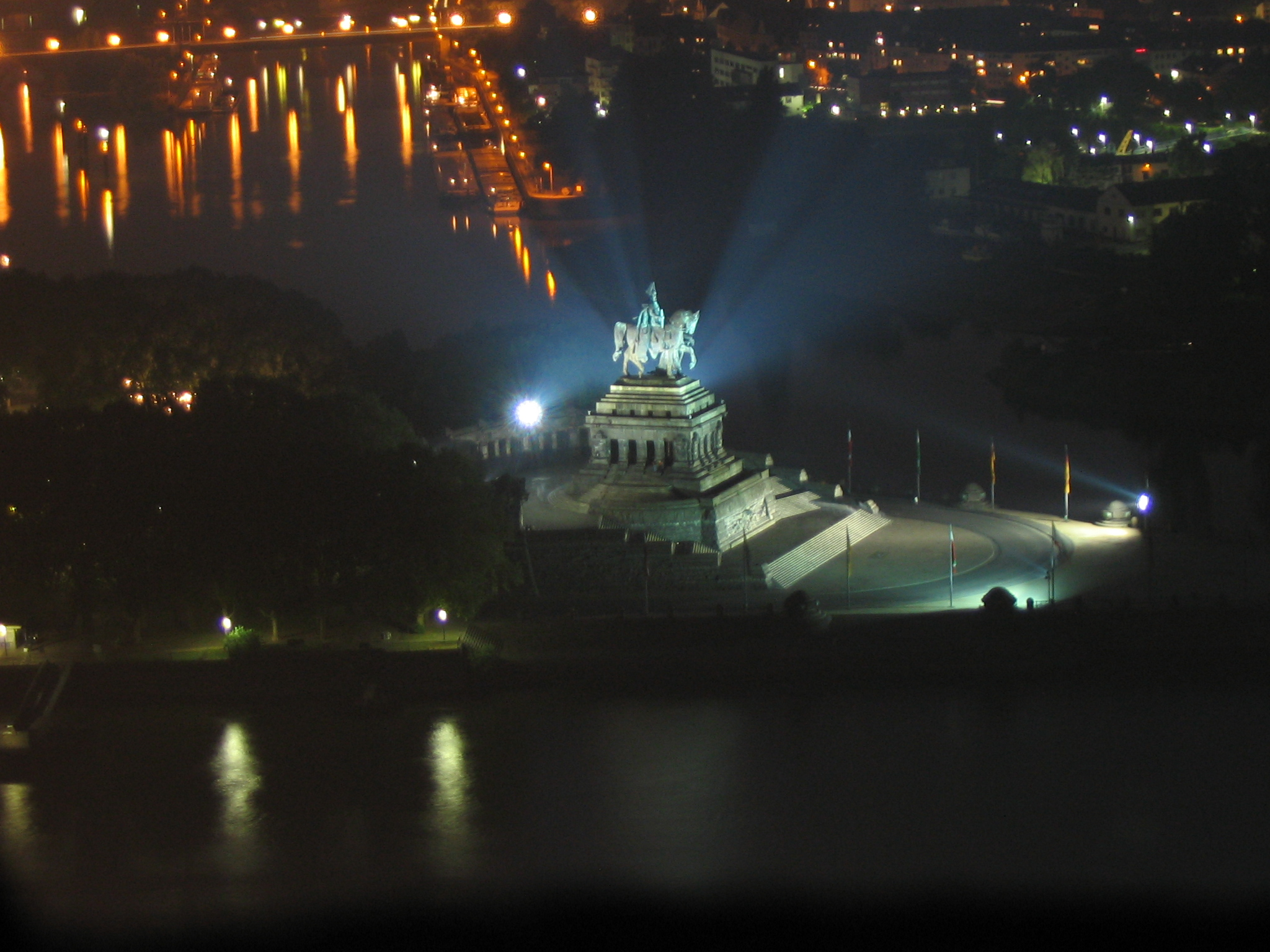
The Deutsches Eck at night, 2004

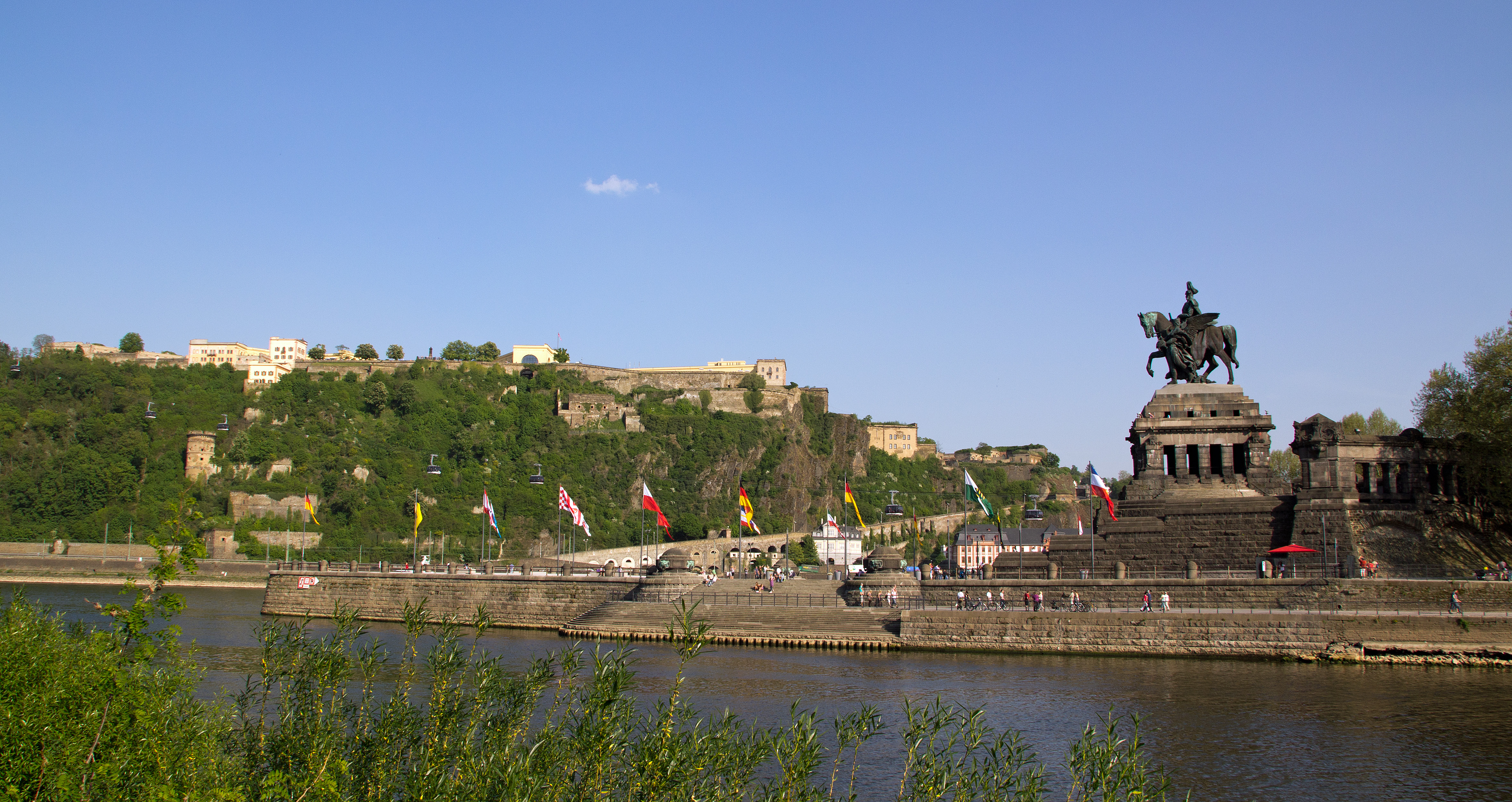
The Deutsches Eck in 2011

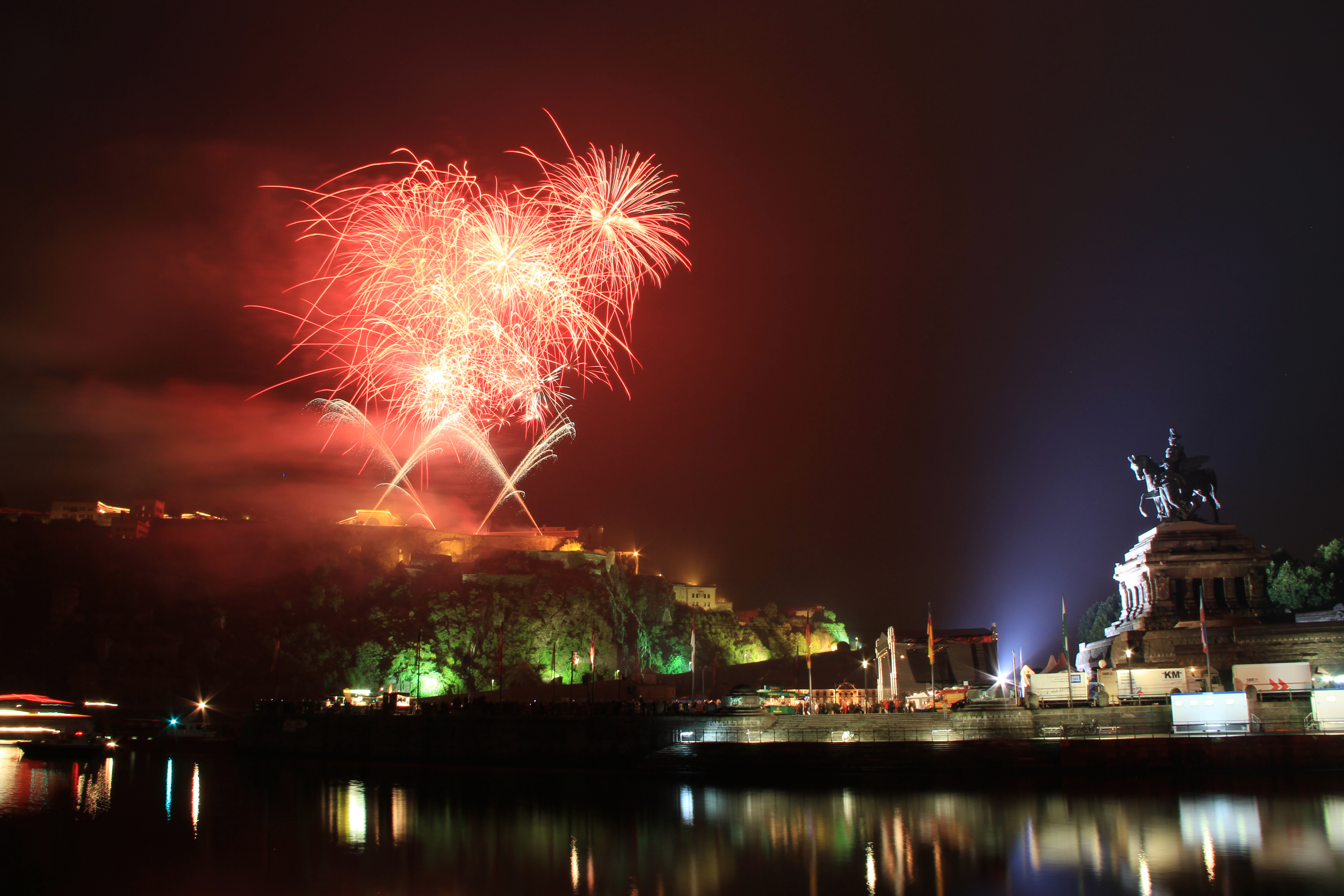
Rhein in Flammen fireworks, 2011

The Deutsches Eck is also a place on Germany's inland waterway system where great skill is needed when making a turn, as the animation on the right makes clear.
