= Braunes Wasser =

River in Germany

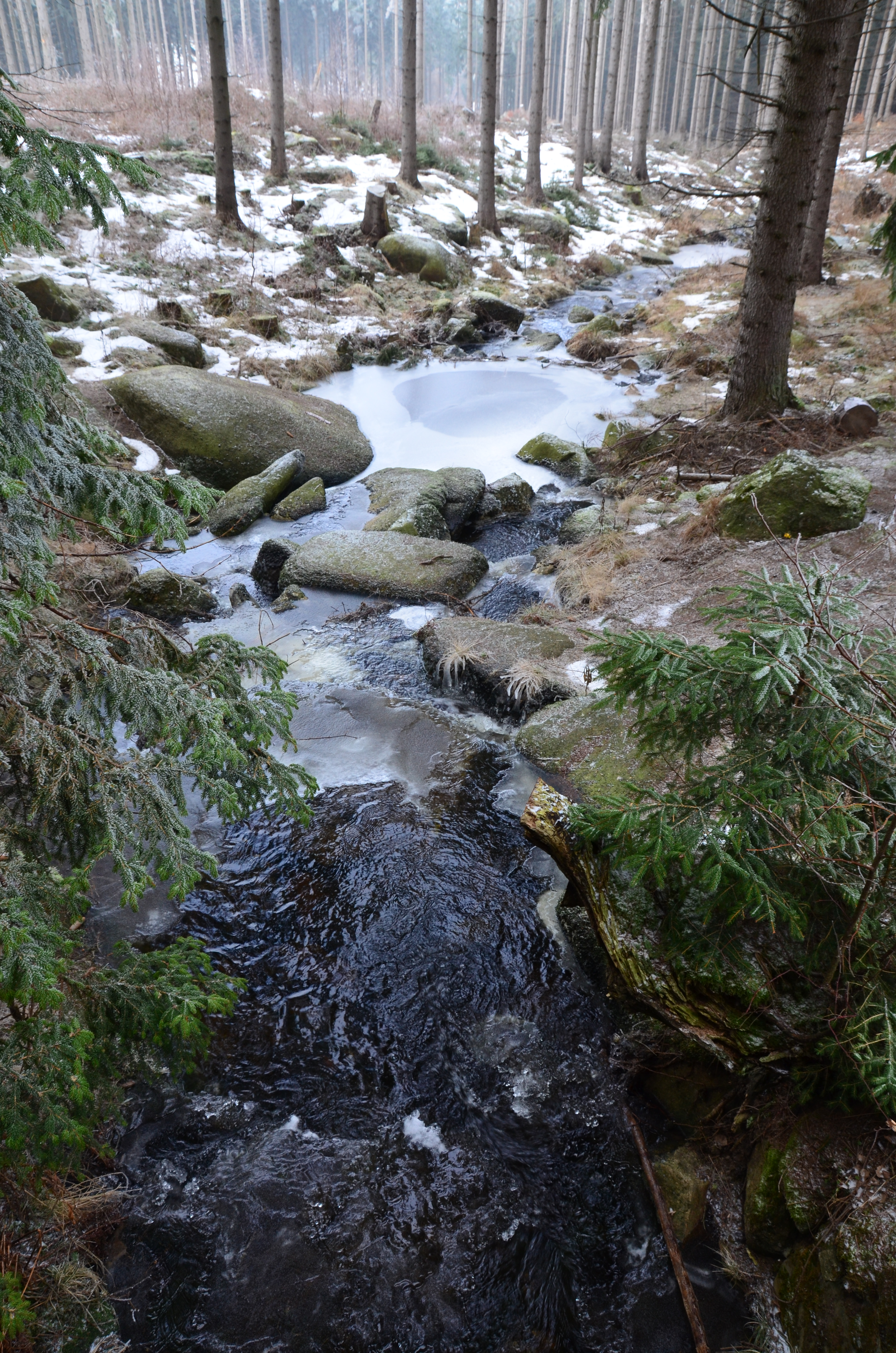

Location
- Country: Germany
- State: Saxony-Anhalt

Physical characteristics
- Source
  - coordinates: 51°46′56″N 10°42′33″E
- Mouth
  - location: Holtemme
  - coordinates: 51.8207°N 10.7421°E

Basin features
- Progression: Holtemme→ Bode→ Saale→ Elbe→ North Sea

Braunes Wasser (German for "brown water") is a river of Saxony-Anhalt, Germany. It flows into the Holtemme near Hasserode.

== See also ==
- List of rivers of Saxony-Anhalt
