= Hasserode =

Coordinates: 51.8258°N 10.7578°E

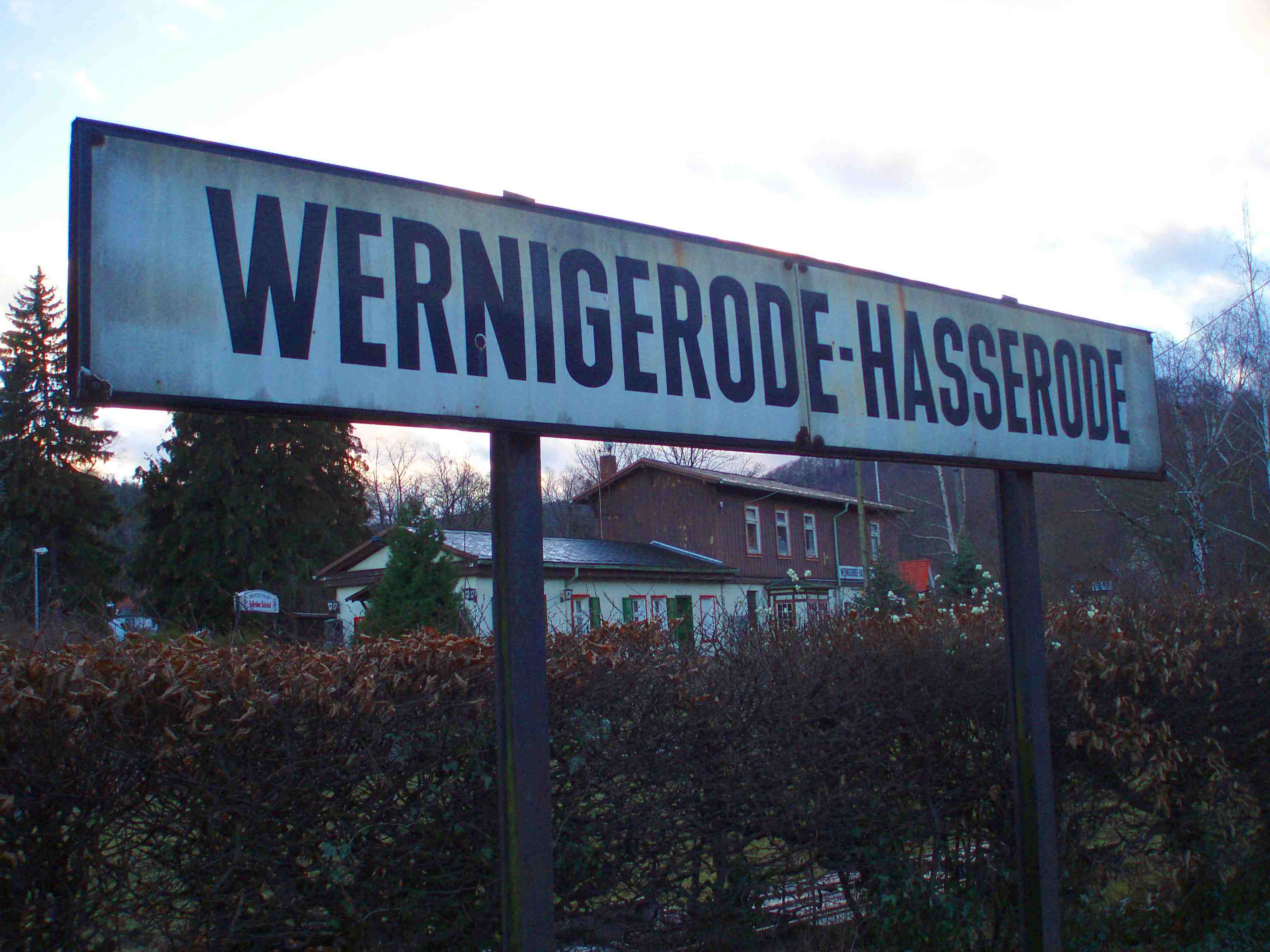
Wernigerode-Hasserode station

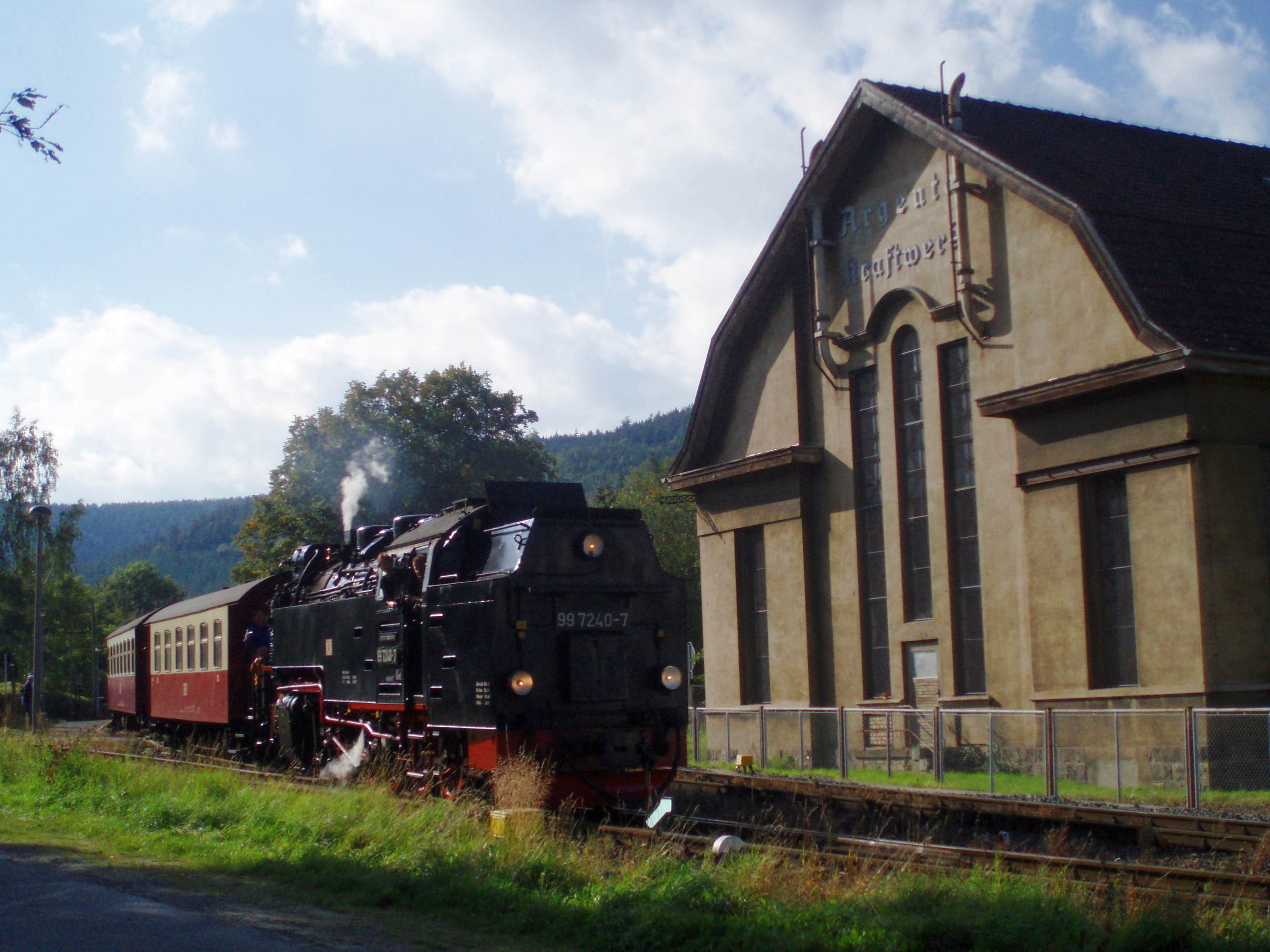
HSB train at the old Argenta power station

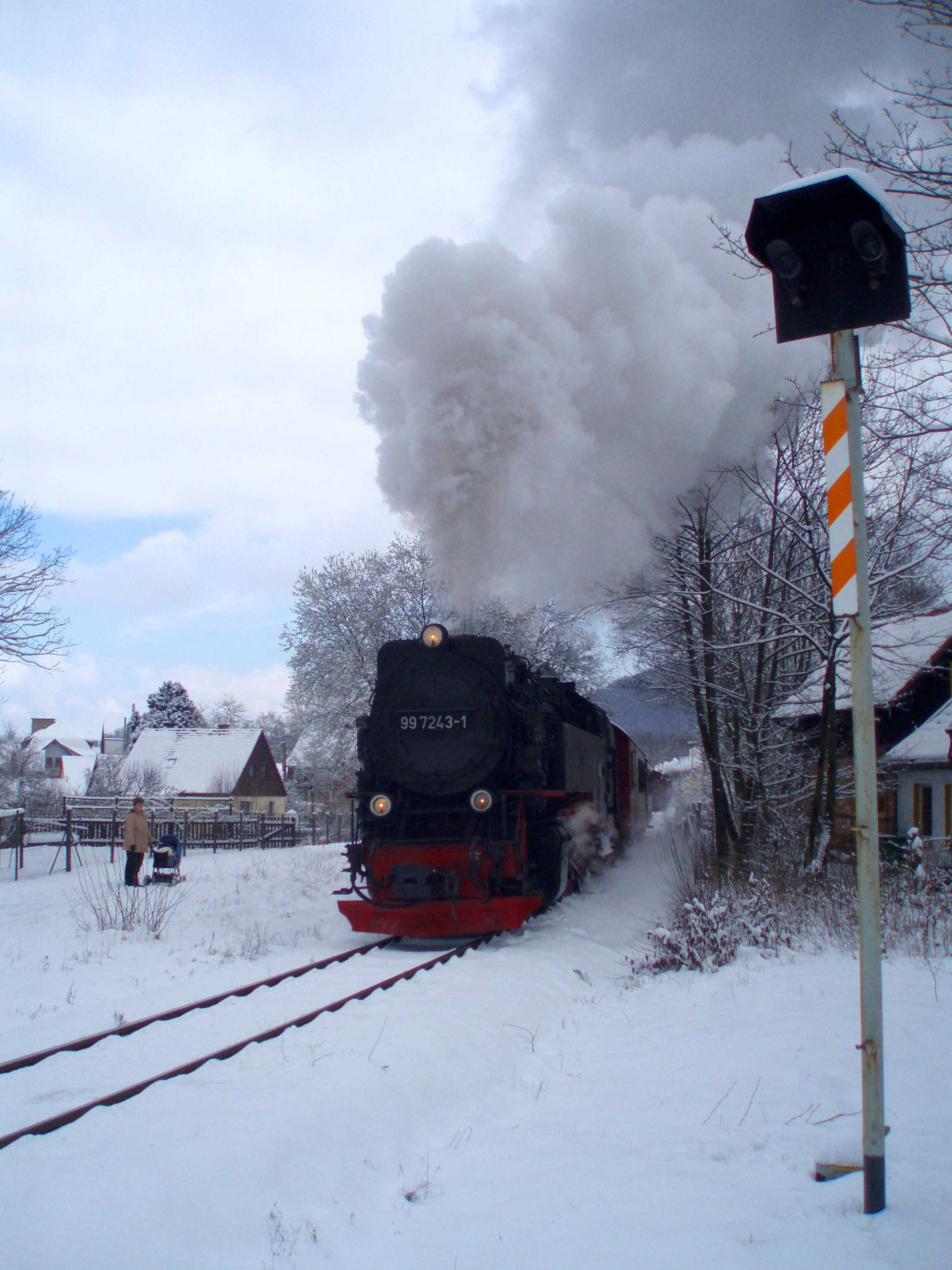
Easter 2008 at Hasserode station

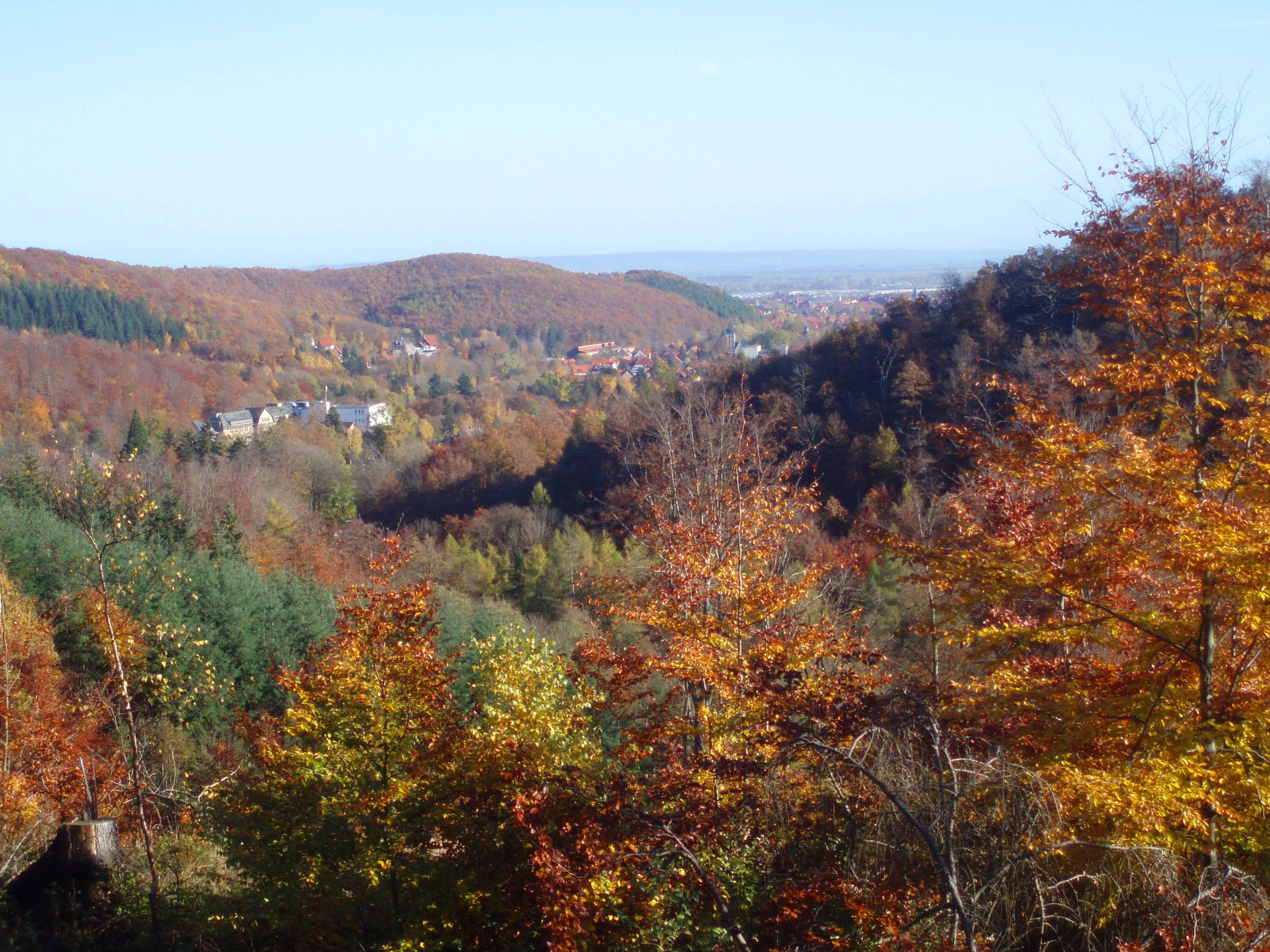
View of Upper Hasserode

Hasserode has been a quarter in the town of Wernigerode in the German state of Saxony-Anhalt since 1907.

== Location ==
Hasserode lies at the foot of the Harz Mountains in the valley of the River Holtemme, whose upper reaches include the water cascade of the Steinerne Renne. A state road (Landstraße) runs through the quarter to Drei Annen Hohne and Schierke in the direction of the Harz's highest mountain, the Brocken. The Harz Railway and Brocken Railway, part of the Harz Narrow Gauge Railways also run through the district which has three stations: Hochschule Harz (formerly Kirchstraße), Wernigerode-Hasserode and Steinerne Renne.

== History ==
The village grew up around Hasserode Castle in the 12th century, but was abandoned by the 16th century and was only reoccupied again in 1768 by order of King Frederick II of Prussia, hence the name Friedrichsthal for the lower part of the parish and the village name of Hasserode-Friedrichsthal which has been used from time to time.

== Places of interest ==
- Christ Church with the painting Kreuzigung im Gedräng by Adam Offinger
- Boeters Mill, old paper mill in Amtsgasse 1

== Tourism ==
The Hasserode Holiday (Hasseröder Ferienpark) was established at the start of the 21st century on Langen Stieg and in the Nessel valley, on the terrain of the old open-air swimming pool. It is a holiday camp with an indoor pool.

Amongst the walking destinations in the area is the Elversstein.

== People born in Hasserode ==
- Johann Christian Meier (1732–1815), pedagogue
- Otto Herfurth (1893–1944), military officer, general in the Wehrmacht of Nazi Germany, and conspirator in the 20 July 1944 plot to assassinate Adolf Hitler

== Personalities ==
- Julius Count of Bose (1809–1894), Prussian infantry general, died in Hasserode
