= Neunkircher Höhe =

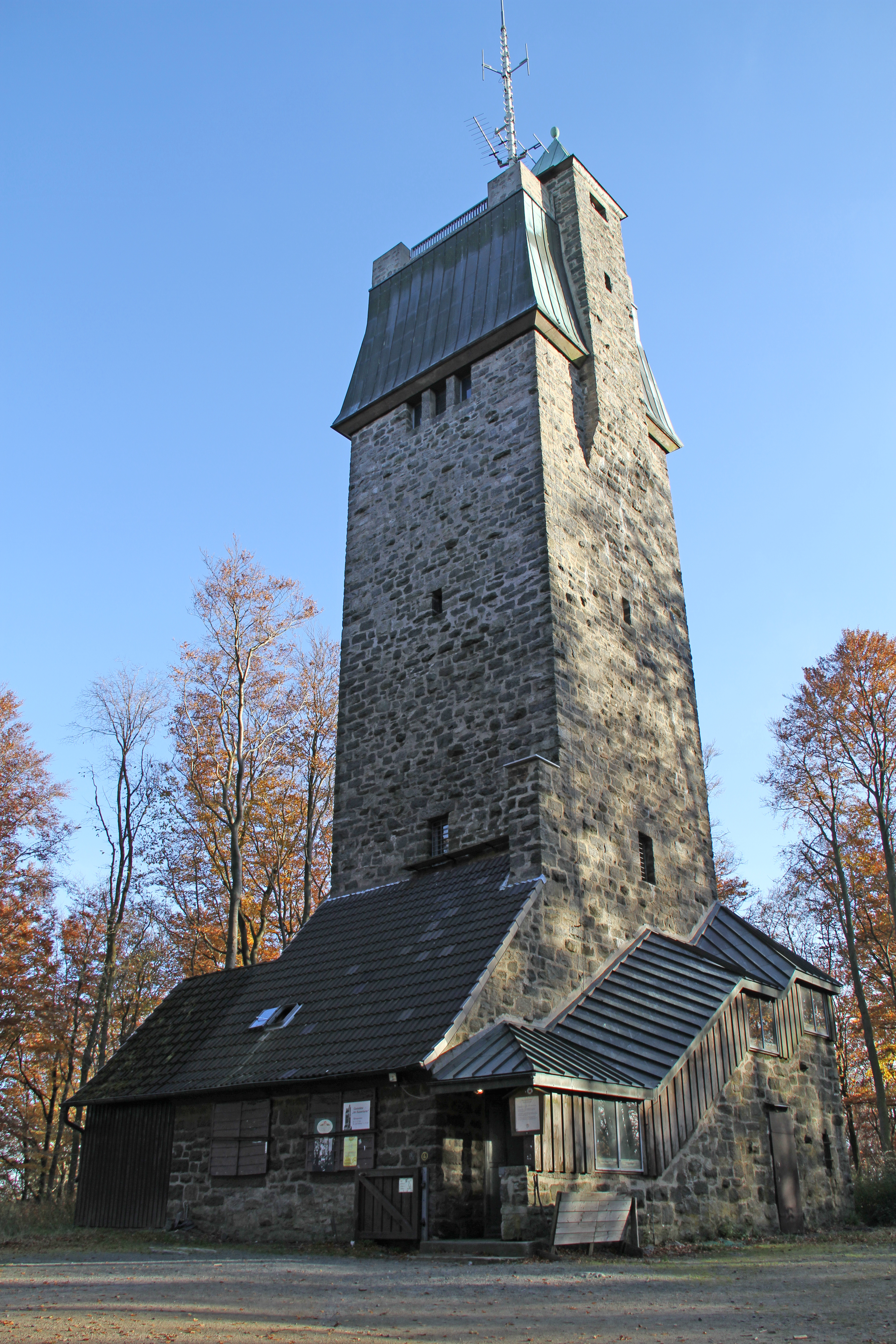
- Viewing tower on the top of the Neunkircher Höhe

Highest point
- Elevation: 605 m (1,985 ft)
- Coordinates: 49°43′8″N 8°46′13″E

Naming
- English translation: Nine churches height
- Language of name: German

Geography
- Location within Hesse
- Location: Hesse, Germany
- Parent range: Odenwald

The Neunkircher Höhe (605 metres) is the highest elevation of the Hessian part of the Odenwald. The hill is located near the village Neunkirchen and is the origin of the rivers Modau, Gersprenz and Lauter.

A viewing tower, 34 metres high, was built on the summit in 1906 and replaced an older predecessor, which had been built in 1888 and destroyed by a storm in 1904.
