= Armeleuteberg =

Hill in Harz, Saxony-Anhalt, Germany

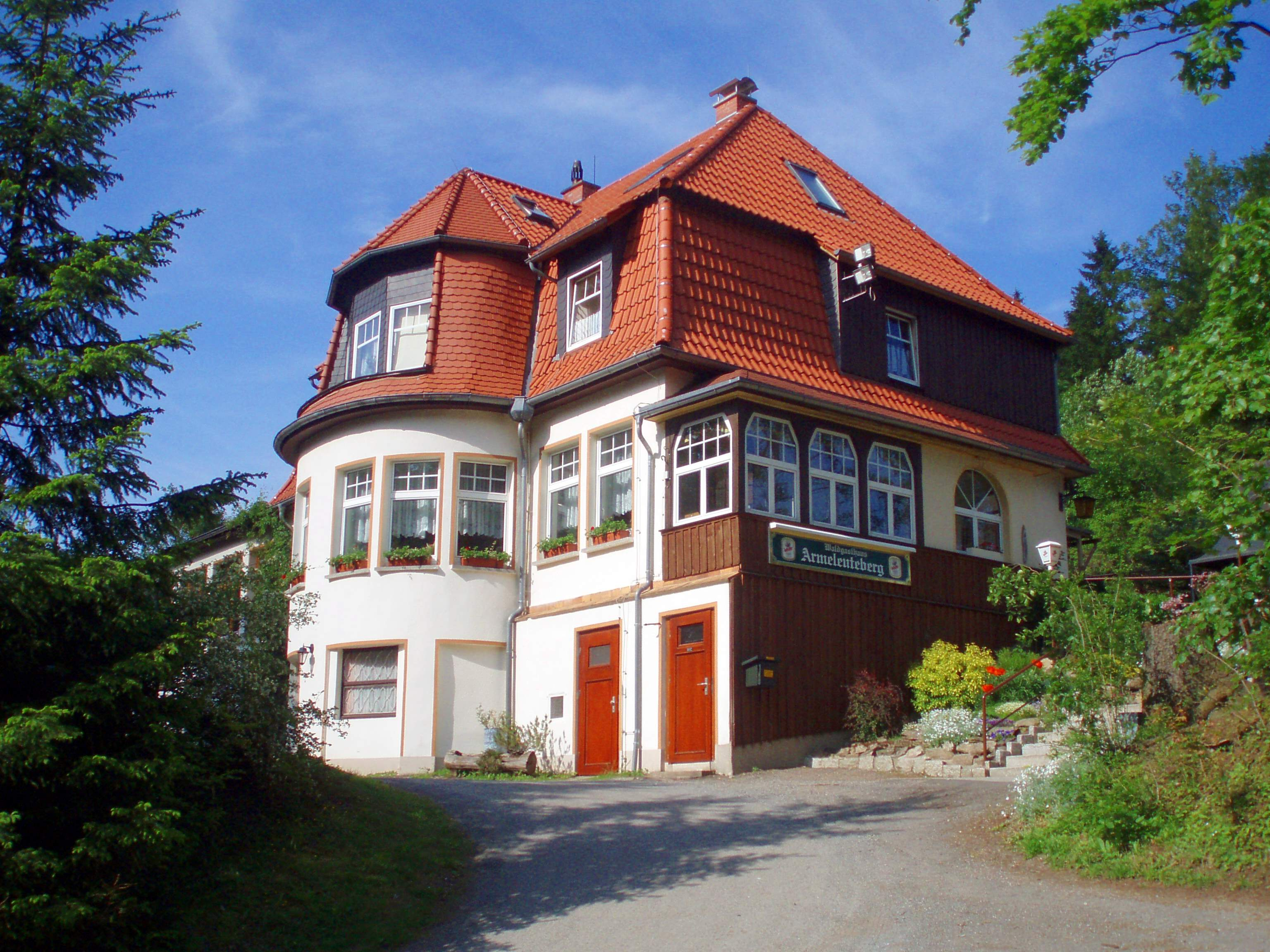
- Armeleuteberg - the forest inn

Highest point
- Elevation: 477.8 m (1,568 ft)
- Coordinates: 51°48′59″N 10°46′53″E

Geography
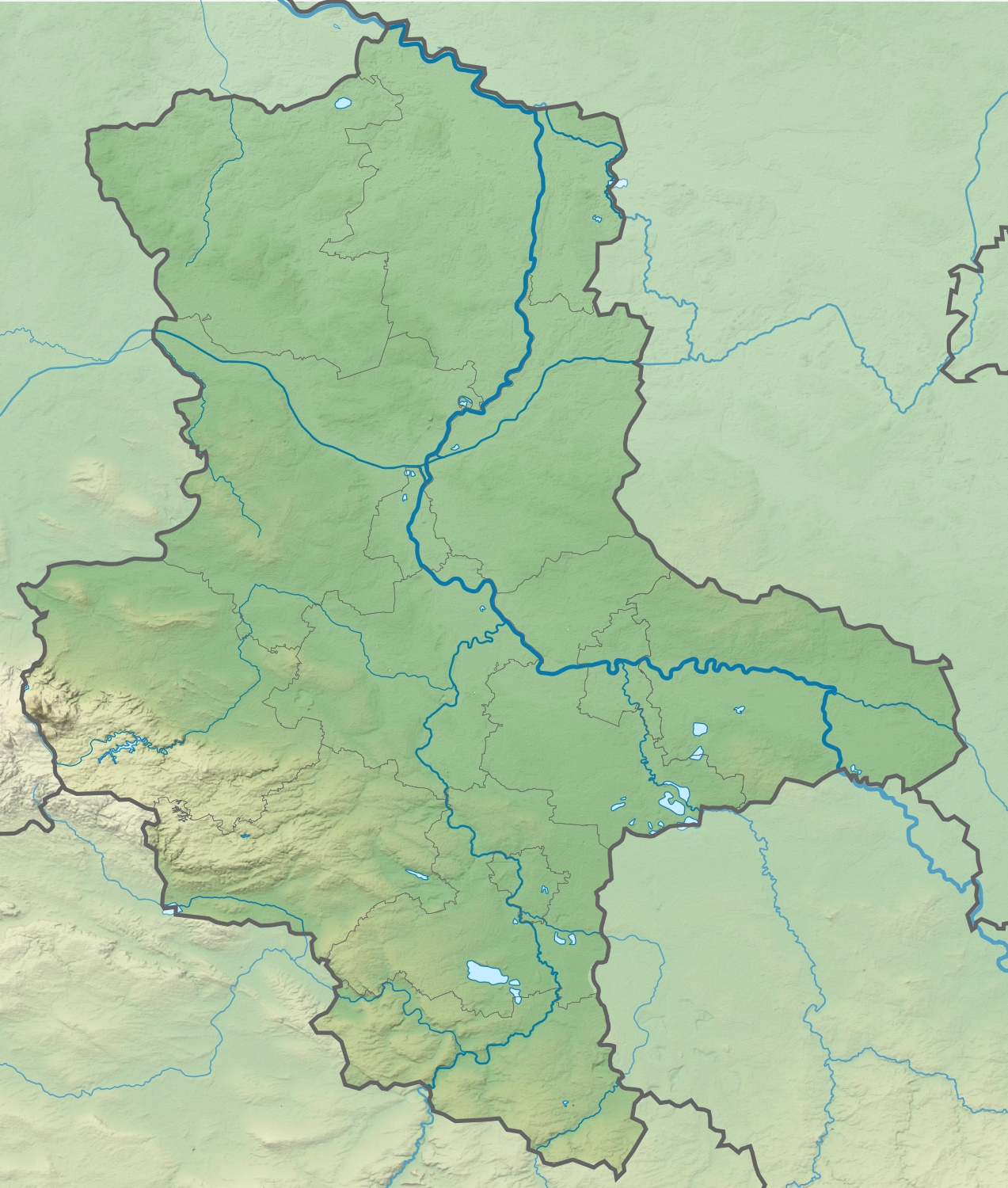
- Location within Saxony-Anhalt
- Location: Sachsen-Anhalt, Germany
- Parent range: Harz Mountains

The Armeleuteberg is a 478-metre-high (1,568 ft) hill south of Wernigerode in the district of Harz in the German state of Saxony-Anhalt. Since 1902 the Kaiserturm, an observation tower, has stood on its summit. Between the Kaiserturm and the Försterplatz car park is the forest inn of the same name.

The Armeleuteberg inn is checkpoint no. 35 in Harzer Wandernadel hiking trail network.
