= Kaiser Tower (Wernigerode) =

Coordinates: 51.816388°N 10.781307°E

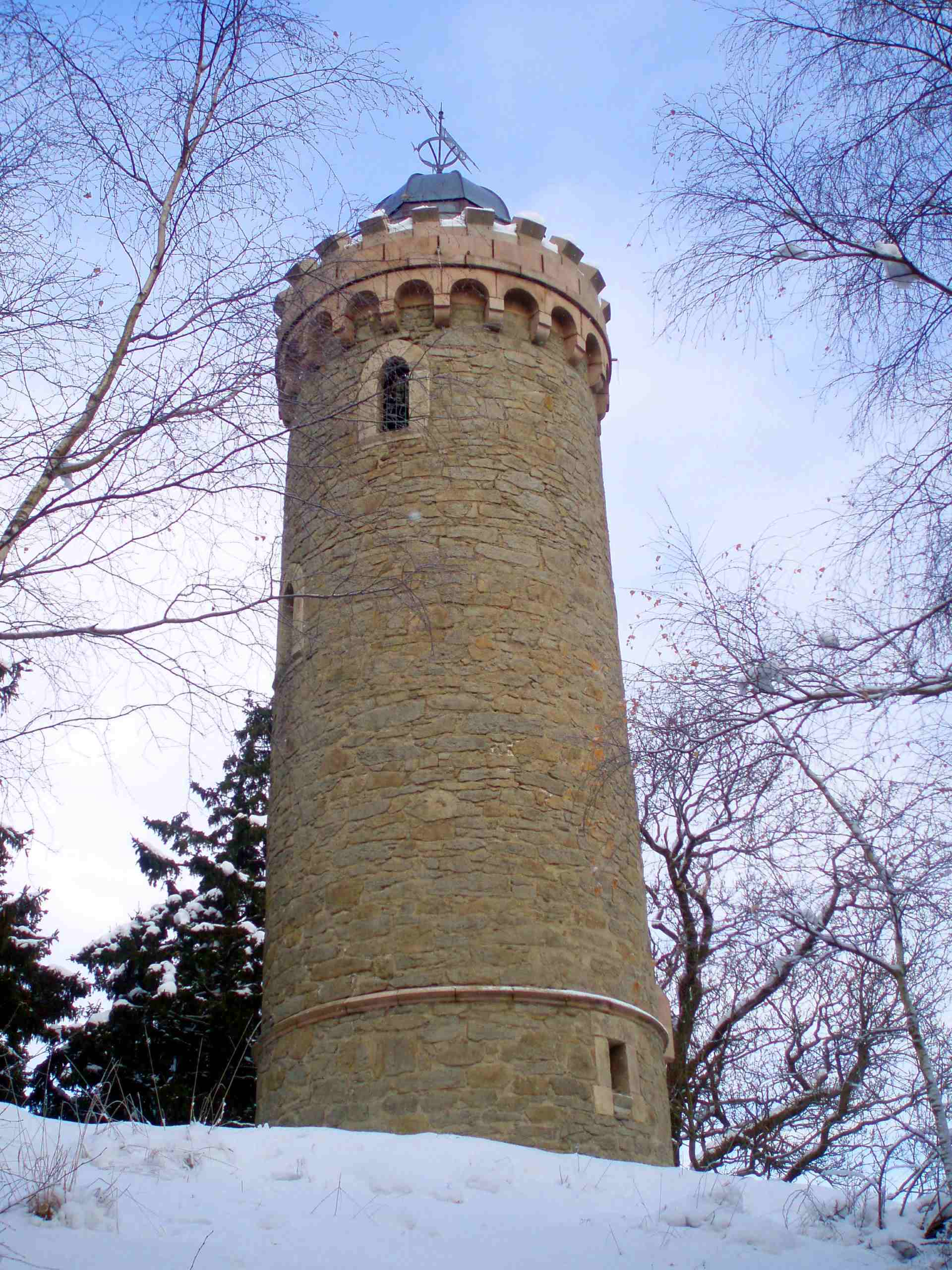
The Kaiser Tower in winter

The Kaiser Tower (German: Kaiserturm) is an observation tower standing on the 478-metre-high hill of Armeleuteberg on the territory of the German town of Wernigerode. It was designed by the royal architect of the princes of Stolberg, Paul Kilburger, and financed and erected by a Wernigerode hotelier, Eduard Lührmann, between 29 May and 1 September 1902. The building stone came mainly from the Königsberg Quarry near Schierke. In 1992 the tower was thoroughly refurbished and made accessible again.

There are views from the tower over the North Harz as far as the Brocken, the Büchenberg and the Harburg. There are also particularly clear views of Wernigerode Castle and the town itself.
