= Drei-Länder-Stein =

Boundary stone in Germany

The Drei-Länder-Stein is a boundary stone at the tripoint of the German federal states of Lower Saxony, Saxony-Anhalt and Thuringia near the Großer Ehrenberg mountain in the Harz.

== Location ==
The Drei-Länder-Stein is located in the South Harz at the tripoint of the three aforementioned states and also the tripoint of the counties of Goslar (Lower Saxony), Harz (Saxony-Anhalt) and Nordhausen (Thuringia). In addition the nature parks of Harz (Lower Saxony), Harz/Saxony-Anhalt and South Harz meet here. The boundary stone is around 3.3 km (2.1 miles) southeast of Hohegeiß (Lower Saxony), some 3.3 km south-southwest of Benneckenstein (Saxony-Anhalt), circa 1.8 km (1.1 miles) northwest of Rothesütte (Thuringia) and about 1.25 km (1,370 yards; all distances as the crow flies) northeast and below the summit of the Großer Ehrenberg (635.5 m above sea level (NN); Thuringia) at about 575 m above NN. The Bundesstraße 4 passes by just under 100 m southwest of the stone. There is a car park for hikers here called Jägerfleck.

== History and description ==
The Drei-Länder-Stein was probably erected by 1749. It bears the inscription: HB (Herzogtum Braunschweig, 'Duchy of Brunswick'), AB (Amt Benneckenstein), which was later changed to KP (Königreich Preußen, 'Kingdom of Prussia'), and GW (Gräflich-Wernigeröder Forstgebiet, 'Comital Wernigerode Forest Estate').

During the Cold War (1945–1990) the stone became a boundary point along the Inner German Border, from 1945 between the British Zone of Occupation in the west and the Soviet Zone of Occupation in the east; and from 1949 between West and East Germany. The so-called Iron Curtain including the Convoy Way (Kolonnenweg) ran past this point. The Convoy Way used to act as a border patrol track, but is now a hiking trail.

Since 3 October 1990, German Unity Day, the boundary stone has marked the borders of Lower Saxony, Saxony-Anhalt and Thuringia. It is now part of the German Green Belt.

== Hiking ==
The Drei-Länder-Stein is no. 47 in the system of checkpoints in the Harzer Wandernadel hiking system. The checkpoint box is located in a refuge hut some 50 metres (160 ft) northeast of the boundary stones (ca. 572.5 m above NN; 51°38′29.4″N 10°42′8.4″E). The Harz Border Way, a 75-kilometre (47-mile) long hiking trail along the former Inner German Border, runs past the checkpoint.

== Gallery ==
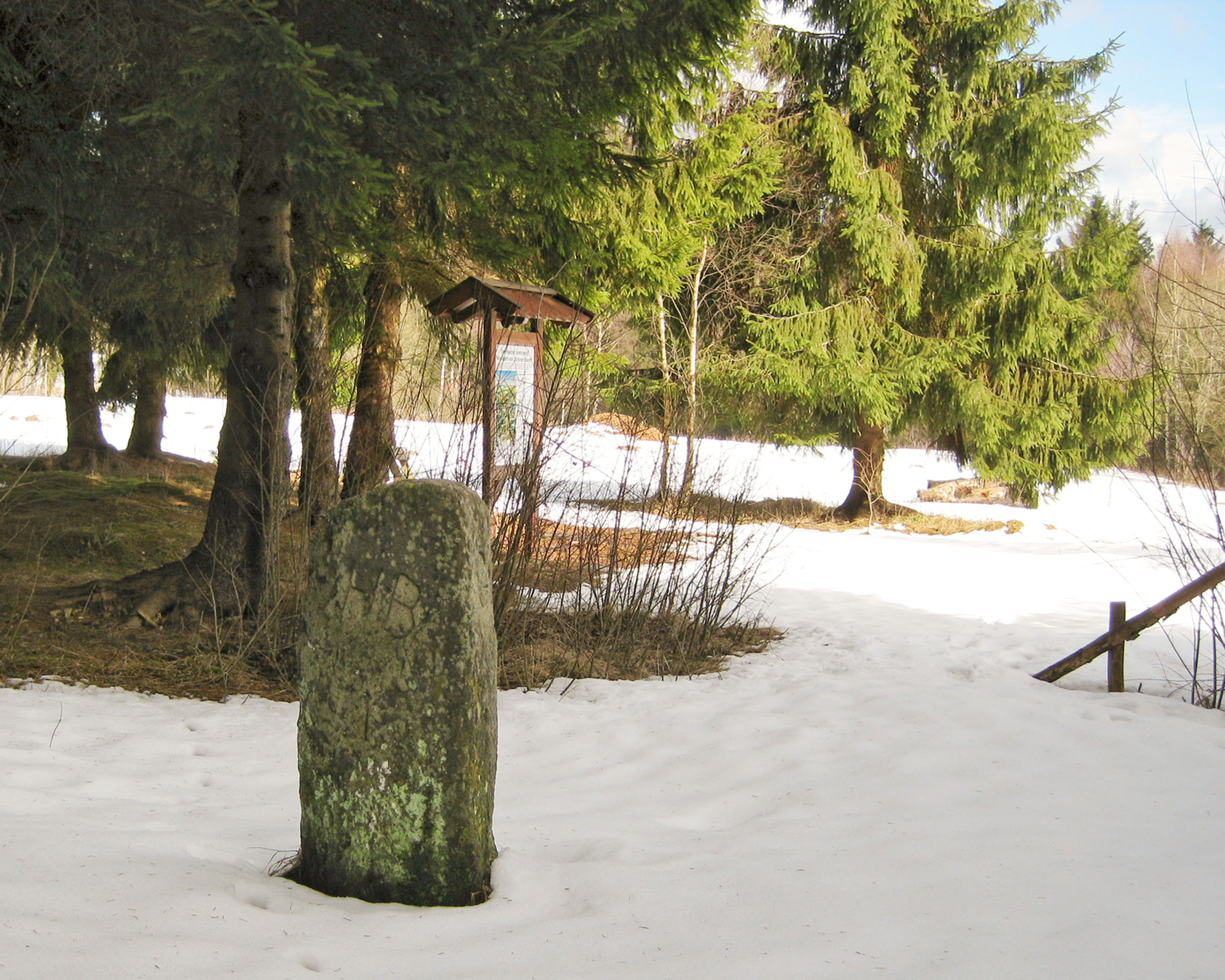
Drei-Länder-Stein in Winter

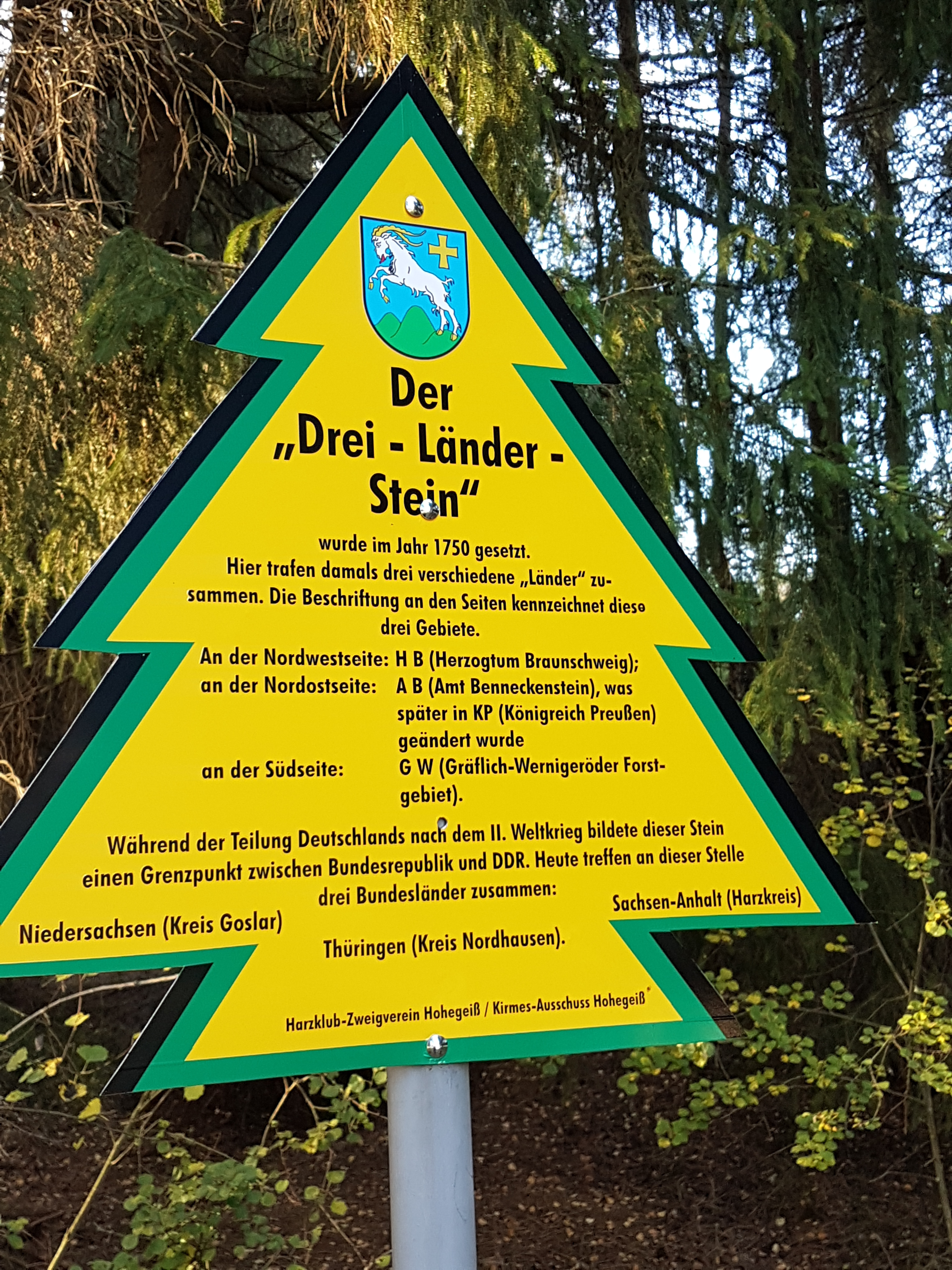
Dennert Fir Tree, Drei-Länder-Stein

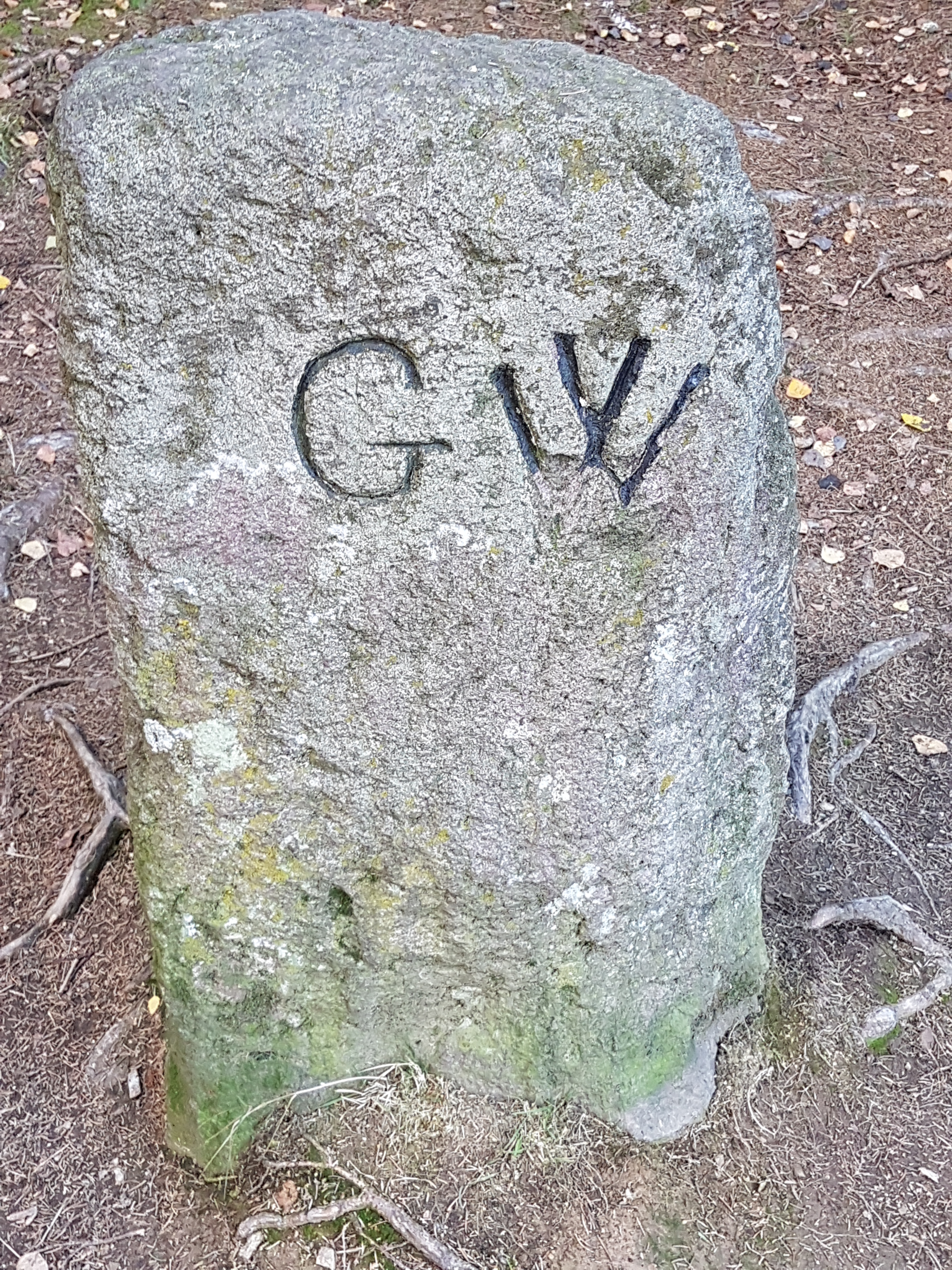
Gräflich-Wernigeröder Forest Area

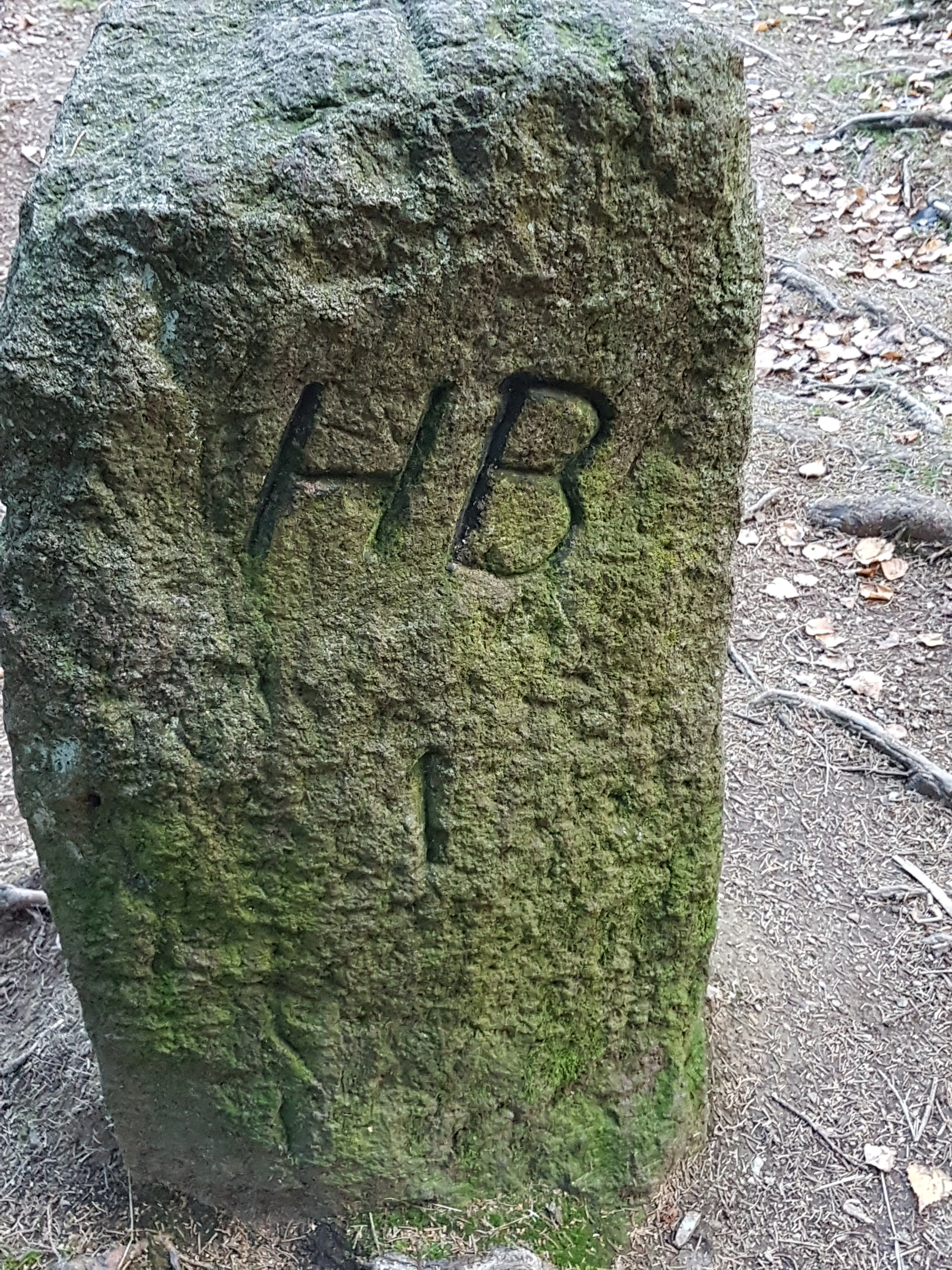
Duchy of Brunswick

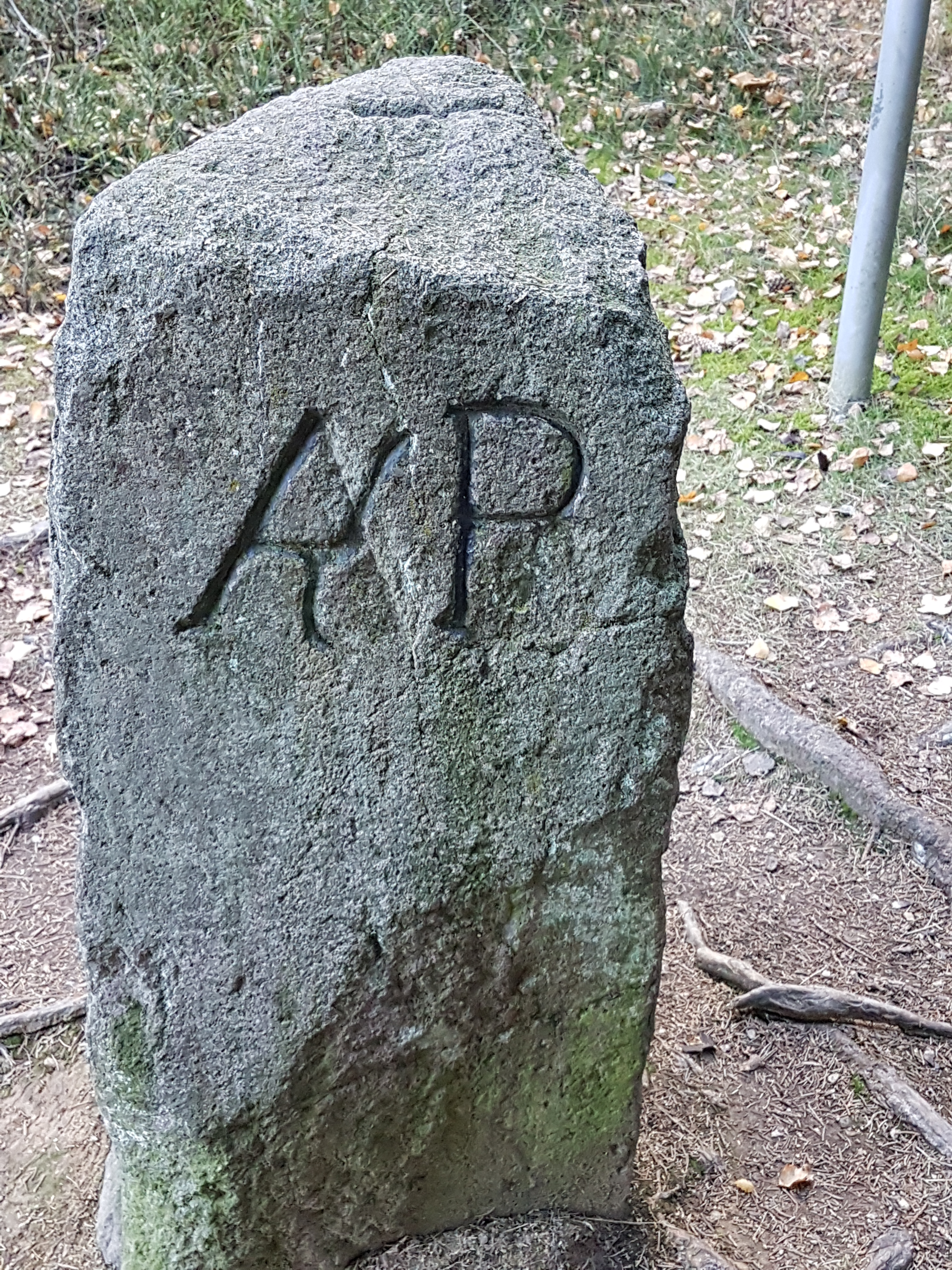
Kingdom of Prussia

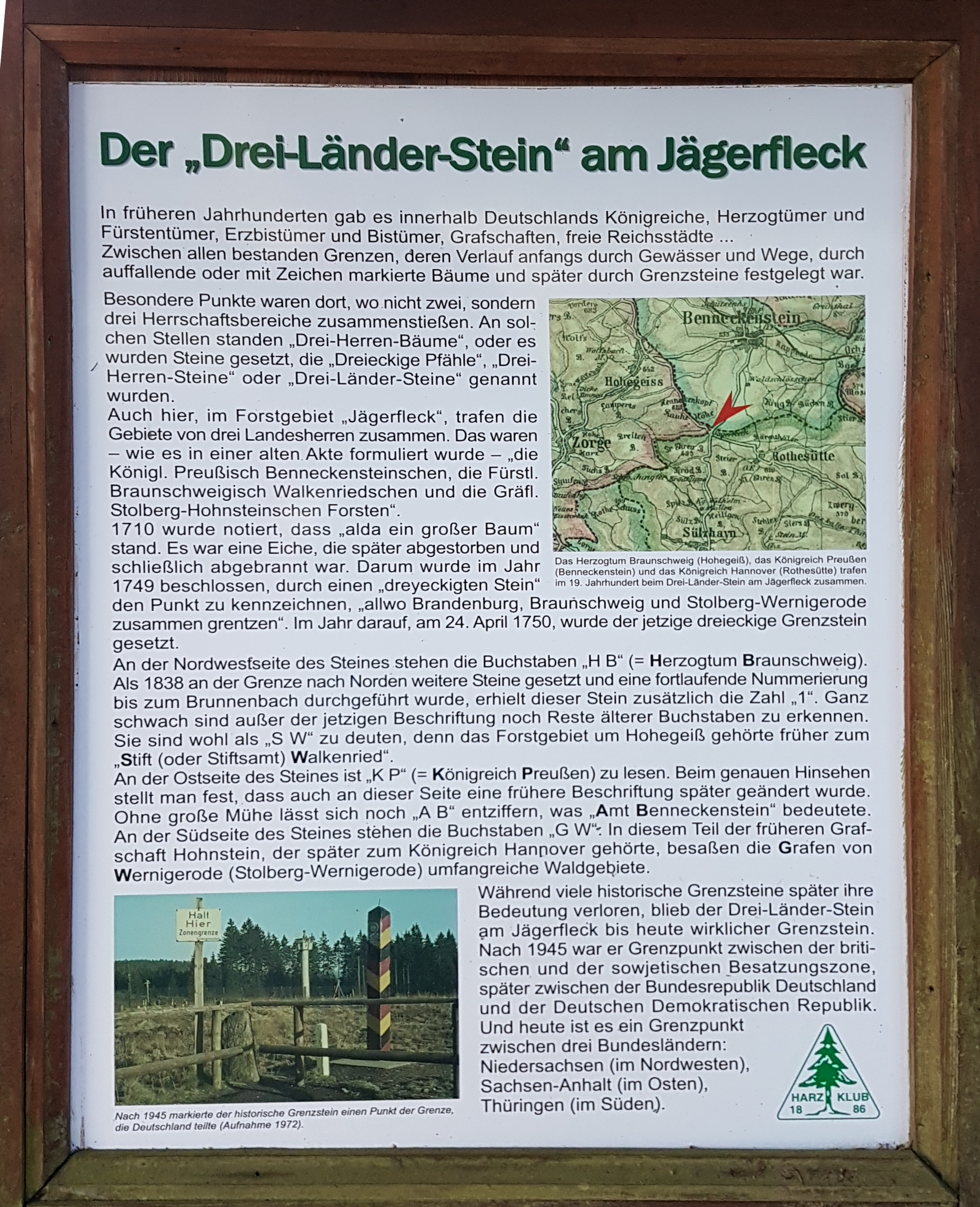
Information board at the Drei-Länder-Stein

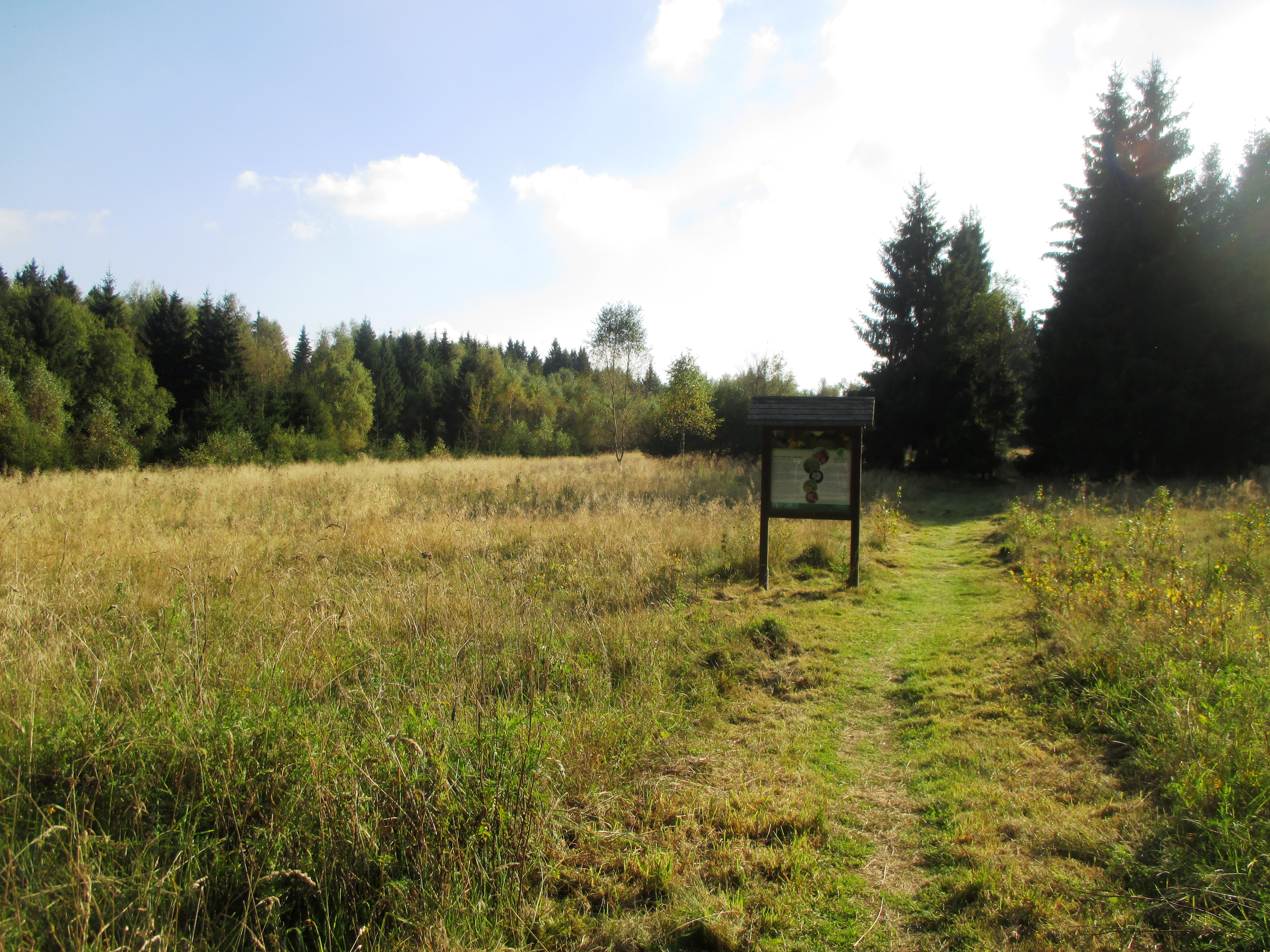
Landscape at the Drei-Länder-Stein
