= Großer Ehrenberg =

Mountain in Germany

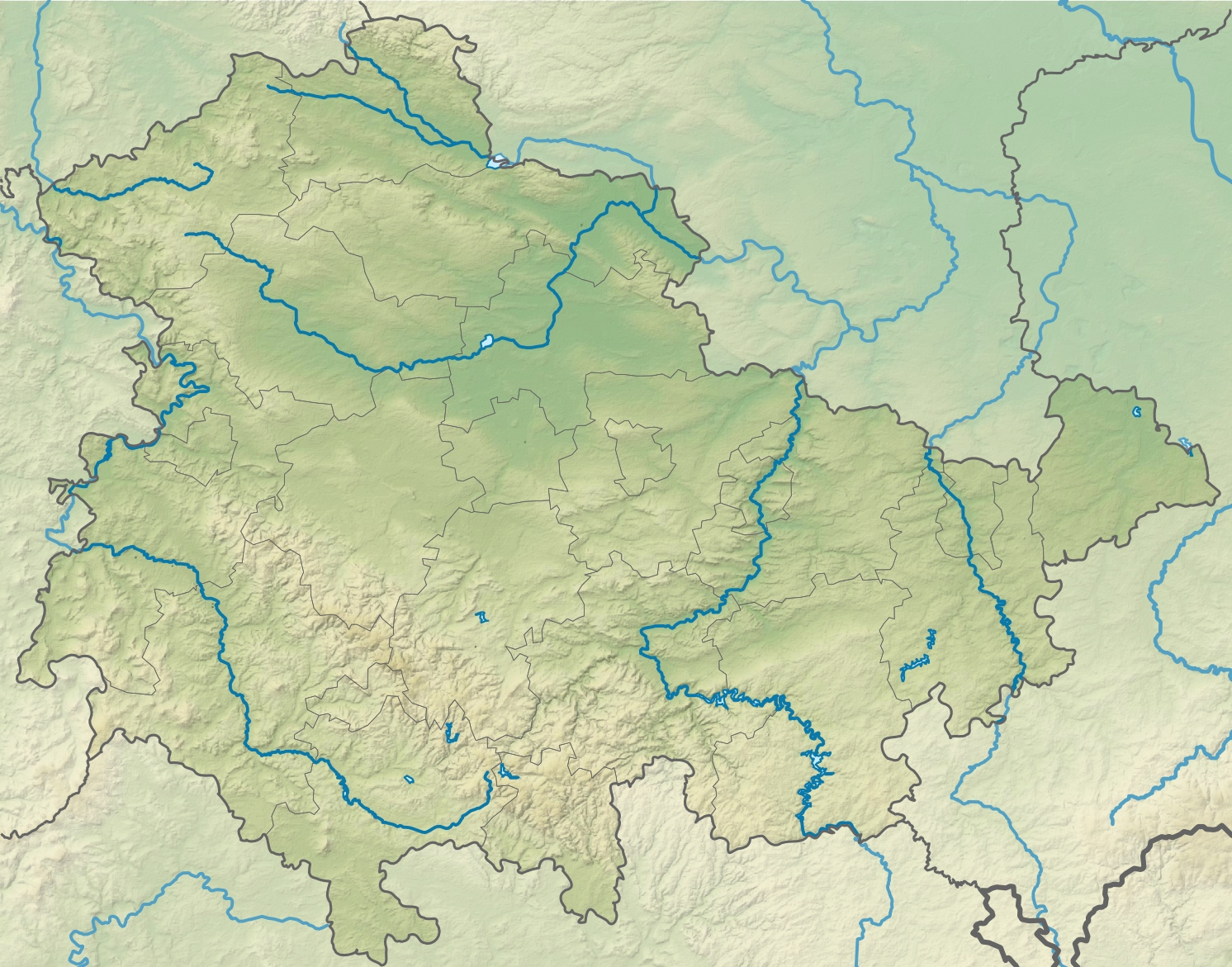
- Location within Thuringia

Highest point
- Elevation: 635.5 m above sea level (NN) (2,085 ft)
- Coordinates: 51°38′4.3″N 10°41′11.3″E

Geography
- Location: Nordhausen, Thuringia, Germany
- Parent range: Harz Mountains

The Großer Ehrenberg is a mountain, 635.5 m above sea level (NN), and the highest peak in the Thuringian part of the Harz mountains. It is also the highest point of the county of Nordhausen in Germany.

== Location ==
The Großer Ehrenberg lies in the South Harz within the South Harz Nature Park. It rises around 2.5 kilometres west of Rothesütte and about 3.5 kilometres north-northwest of Sülzhayn, which both belong to Ellrich. To the north the terrain drops into the valley of the Großer Kunzenbach and, to the west, into the valley of the Kleiner Kunzenbach which each flow along the border between Thuringian and Lower Saxony and merge to form the Kunzenbach immediately west of, and below, the mountain. The eastern spur of the mountain is the Dornkopf (579 m above NN). This spur and the Großer Ehrenberg itslet are passed by the Landesstraße 1014, which branches off the Bundesstraße 4 between the tripoint of the states of Lower Saxony, Saxony-Anhalt and Thuringia und Rothesütte and runs from there roughly in a north–south direction to Sülzhayn. Both peaks are accessible inter alia from this road on forest tracks.

== Inner-German Border ==
The old Inner German Border used to run along the valleys of the Großer Kunzenbach and Kleiner Kunzenbach to the north and west of, and below, the Großer Ehrenberg. However, the Iron Curtain, including the convoy track, ran right over the summit. Today the German Green Belt runs over the mountain. To the northeast of the peak on the former Inner German Border at the tripoint of the three states is the Dreiländerstein.

== Height ==
The Großer Ehrenberg is 635.5 m above NN high. On topographic maps a trig point is shown near its highest point with a height of 635.3 m above NN.

== See also ==
- List of mountains and hills of the Harz
