= Hohegeiß =

- Stadtteil of Braunlage
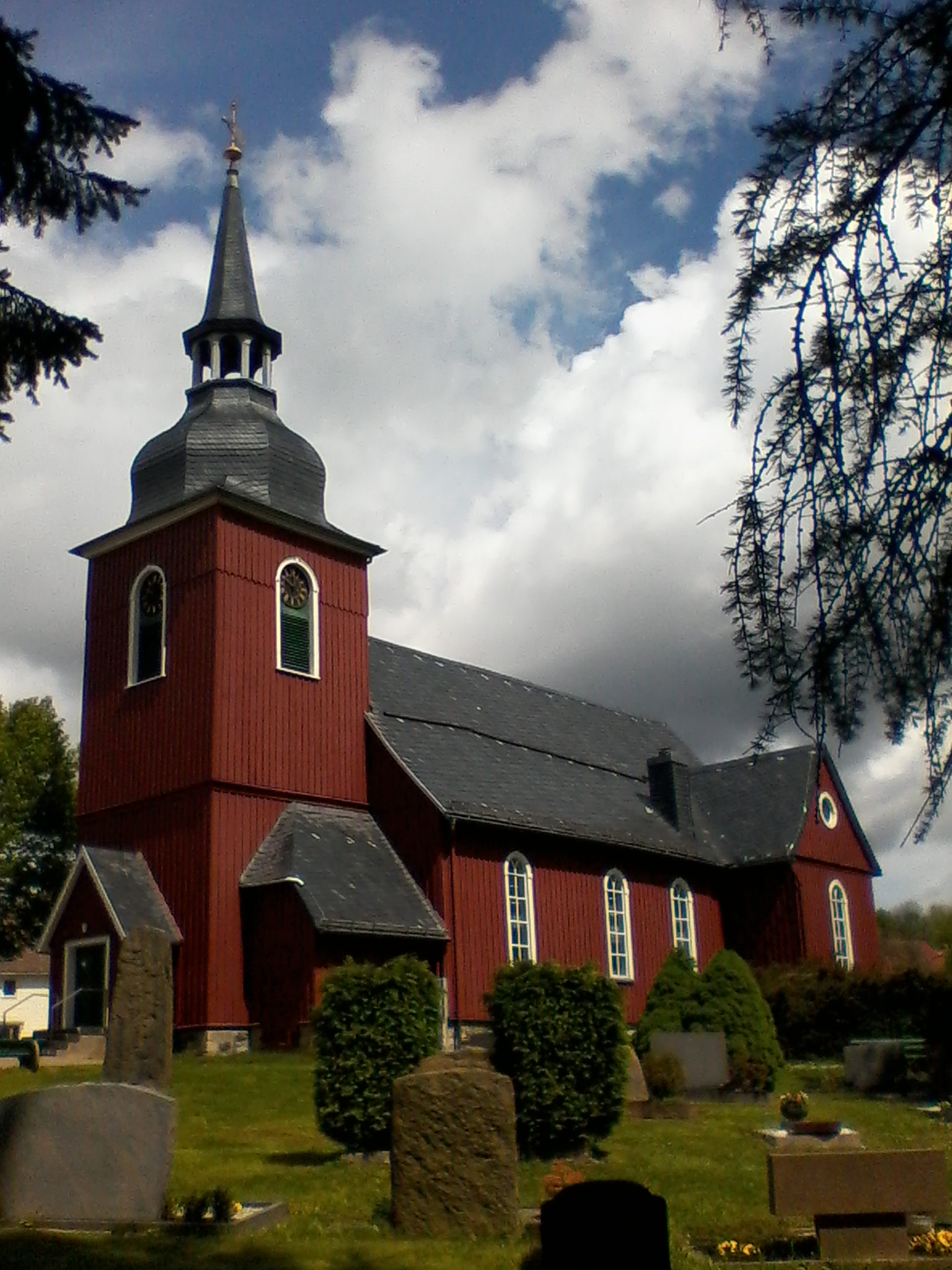
- Parish church

- Coat of arms
- Interactive map of Hohegeiß
- Location within Germany Location within Lower Saxony
- Coordinates: 51°39′50″N 10°40′08″E
- Country: Germany
- State: Lower Saxony
- District: Goslar
- Town: Braunlage
- Elevation: 600 m (2,000 ft)

Population
  - Total: 909
- Time zone: UTC+01:00 (CET)
  - Summer (DST): UTC+02:00 (CEST)
- Postal codes: 38700
- Dialling codes: 05583

Hohegeiss (German: Hohegeiß, pronounced [ˈhoːəˌɡaɪs]) is a health resort and winter sports village in the Harz mountains range in Lower Saxony, Germany. Since 1 July 1972 Hohegeiss has been part of the town of Braunlage, in the district of Goslar.

== Geography ==
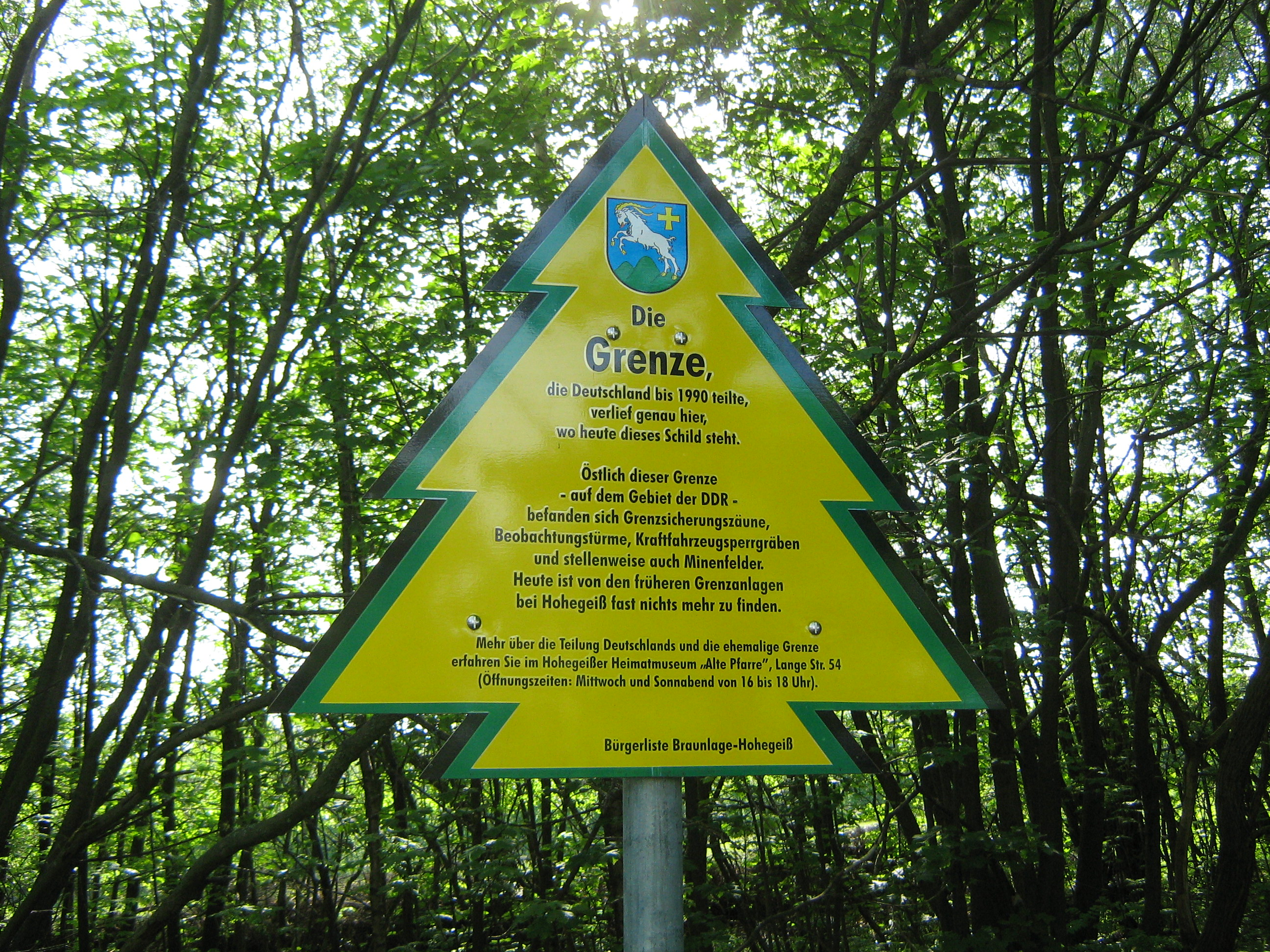
Sign on the edge of Hohegeiß to mark the former border

Hohegeiss lies on the Bundesstrasse 4 highway running across the Harz range, between Braunlage proper and Benneckenstein, at a height of between 570 and 642 m above NN. Neighbouring villages are Zorge to the south, Rothesütte (part of Ellrich) to the southeast, Benneckenstein to the east, and Sorge to the north. The village has about 1,000 inhabitants.

The former inner German border (today the state border with Saxony-Anhalt) runs immediately on the northeastern edge of the settlement. On this border, about 3.3 km to the southeast of the village, is the tripoint for the three states of Lower Saxony, Saxony-Anhalt and Thuringia, which is marked by the Drei-Länder-Stein.

The mountain village is surrounded by the Harz Nature Park. Near the village is the Dicke Tannen natural monument with the largest spruce trees in Northern Germany.

== History ==
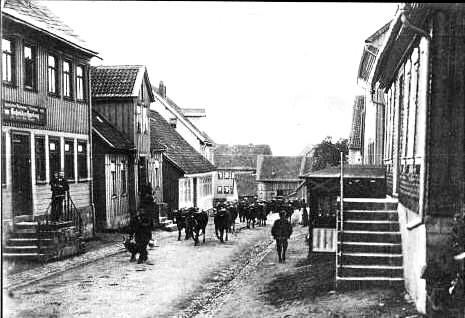
Hohegeiss around 1900

The village name comes from Hogeyz, the name of a wooded region that is documented as early as in 1268. A first chapel was erected in the woods in 1444, a settlement was mentioned in 1528. With the former estates of Walkenried Abbey, Hohegeiss fell to the Dukes of Brunswick-Lüneburg and was administrated within the former County of Blankenburg as a southeastern exclave of the Principality of Wolfenbüttel. The present-day Protestant church was consecrated in 1704. The former mining area became a popular tourist destination from the late 19th century onwards.

When the inner German border was drawn in 1945, the former Brunswick territories around Blankenburg were divided between the British and the Soviet occupation zone. Hohegeiss together with Braunlage and the villages of Neuhof, Walkenried, Wieda, and Zorge became part of Lower Saxony in West Germany. On 1 August 1963 there was an escape attempt on the inner German border at the exit to the village of Hohegeiss by 23-year-old Helmut Kleinert (1940–1963) during which he was shot dead by East German border guards. In 1971 a wooden cross, which had been set up since Kleinert's death, was replaced by a memorial stone with the inscription "Am 01.08.1963 wurde 150 Meter von hier Helmut Kleinert vor dem Überschreiten der Demarkationslinie erschossen" ("On 01.08.1963 Helmut Kleinert was shot dead 150 metres from here before crossing the demarcation line.")

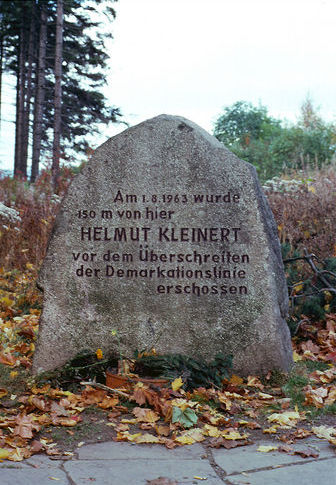
Memorial stone for Helmut Kleinert

== Notable residents ==
=== Born in Hohegeiss ===
- Karl Uhde (1813–1885), surgeon
- Hermann Grote (1885–1971), composer and pedagogue

=== Other notable residents ===
- Fred Denger, (1920–1983) author
- Karlheinz Schreiber (born 1934), businessman, known for the alleged role in the CDU donations scandal
