= Klaus Leidorf =

German photographer and archaeologist

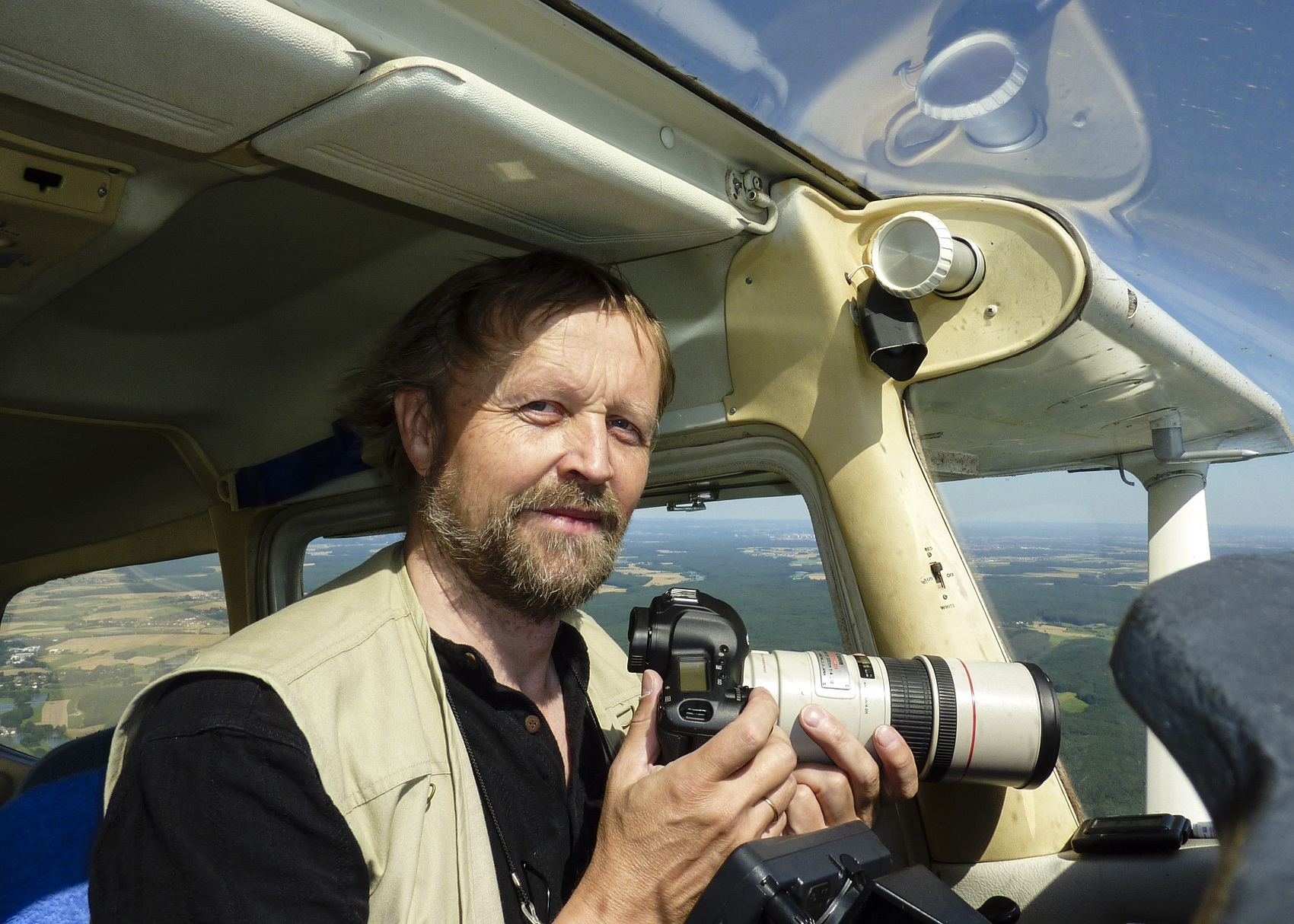
Klaus Leidorf

Klaus Leidorf (born 5 June 1956) is a German aerial archaeologist.

== Early life ==
From 1976 to 1983, he studied Protestant theology and pre- and early history in Bonn and Marburg. Followed by a position as a scientific assistant at the University of Marburg from 1983 to 1985 and as an employee at the Bavarian State Office for the Preservation of Historical Monuments from 1985 to 1989. In 1988, he followed his fascination for aviation and photography and got his private pilot licence. Since then he has been working as an aerial archaeologist with the focus on Bavaria. Furthermore, he had lectureships at the Universities of Marburg, Würzburg and the Ruhr-University Bochum. He founded the publishing company Verlag Marie Leidorf, one of the larger German-language publishers for archaeological literature. Besides the tracing of countless undiscovered ancient monuments, his interest rises for the aerial documentation. Since the turnaround, he took photos of the German Green Belt, the former border between East and West Germany, in the years 1996, 2003 and 2008. Besides his documental work, he has accumulated a vast collection of artistic photographs from the birds eye view. They show the artistic-aesthetic survey of the manmade landscape and nature. His intuition for those structures and characteristics is unmistakable. His photos have been published in several calendars and books.

== Works ==
Books

- Klaus Leidorf, Peter Ettel: Burgen in Bayern. 7000 Jahre Burgengeschichte im Luftbild, Konrad Theiss Verlag Stuttgart, 1999, ISBN 3-8062-1364-X
- München neu entdecken, Kiebitz Buch Verlag, 2002, ISBN 3980780007
- Übersicht: Luftbilder von Klaus Leidorf, Verlag Marie Leidorf GmbH, 2002, ISBN 978-3-924734-77-0
- Klaus Leidorf (Luftbilder), R.W.B. McCormack (Texte): Hoch über MÜNCHEN, Kulturverlag Starnberg, 2009, ISBN 978-3-941167-19-3
- Klaus Leidorf: Hoch über Bayern: Einmalige Entdeckungen aus der Vogelperspektive, Volk Verlag München, 2011, ISBN 978-3-86222-047-2
- Klaus Leidorf: Hoch über Bayern 2: Neue erstaunliche Entdeckungen aus der Vogelperspektive, Volk Verlag München, 2012, ISBN 978-3-86222-062-5

Calendars

- Klaus Leidorf: Wandkalender Starnberger See 2009, Kulturverlag Starnberg, ISBN 978-3-941167-14-8
- Klaus Leidorf: Wandkalender Hoch über Bayern – Monatskalender 2013, Volk Verlag München, 2012, ISBN 978-3-86222-082-3
