= Dicke Tannen =

Coordinates: 51°39′24″N 10°39′06″E

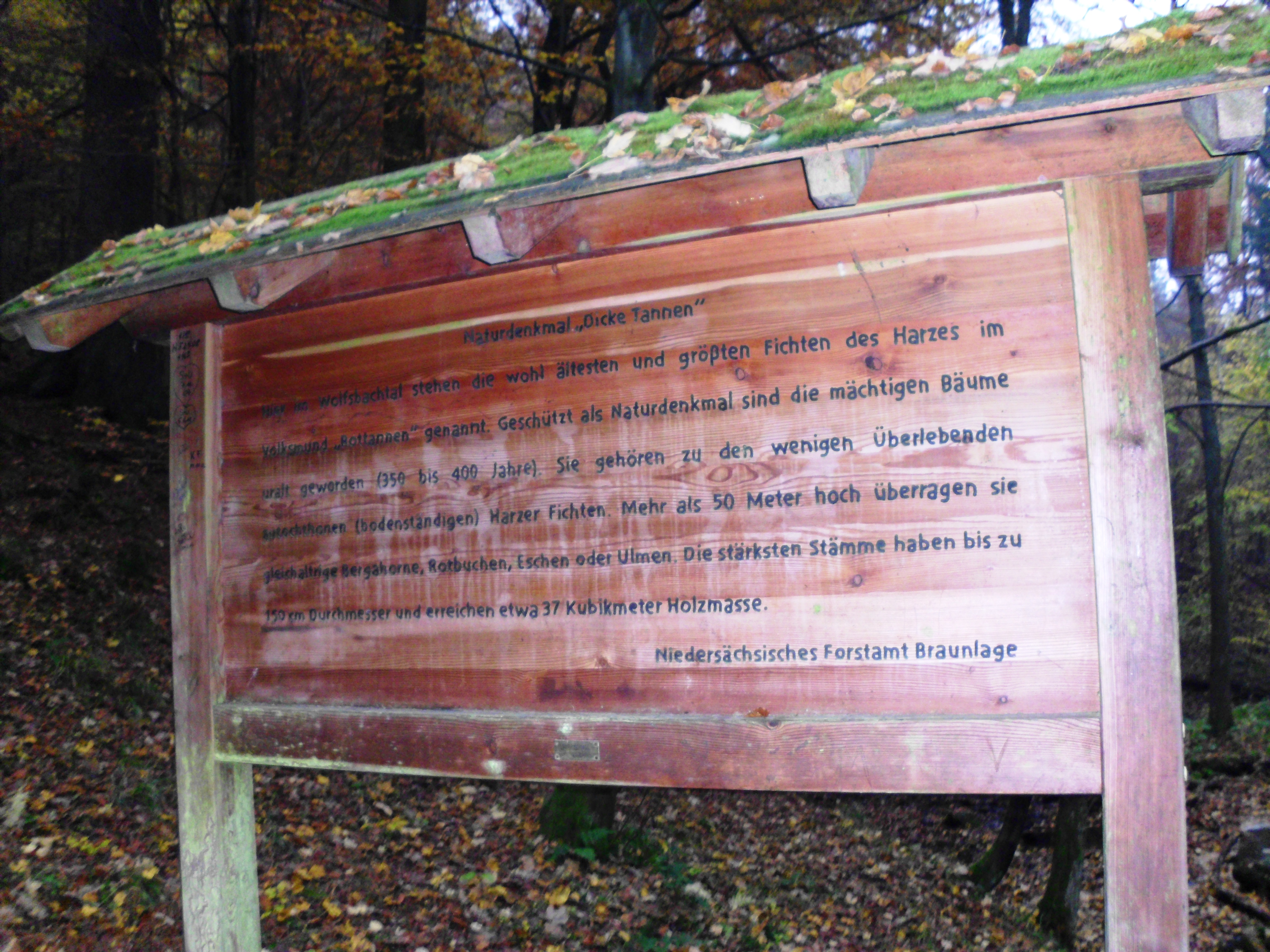
Information board on Dicke Tannen

Dicke Tannen is a protected landscape, around 4.2 hectares (10 acres) in area, near the Harz village of Hohegeiß, which lies in the borough of Braunlage. It is host to what are widely considered to be the strongest spruce trees in North Germany; the individual trees reaching heights of 50 metres and trunk diameters of 100 to 180 centimetres. The landscape has been specially protected since 1989 as a natural monument.

The trees, which are up to 350 years old and known colloquially as Rottannen ("Red Firs") were first mentioned in the 18th century in forestry documents. They owe their survival, firstly, to their location on the steep, wind-sheltered slopes of the narrow Wolfsbach valley; secondly, the fact that they were almost too difficult to fell with the axes and saws of the time on account of their huge size and the transportation of their timber would have proven almost impossible. As a result the area has not been used for forestry for over 200 years and thus gives the impression of almost being a virgin forest.

Whilst around 1900, just under 120 trees were counted; around 1960 there were 85, in 1980, just 58, and currently there are only 23 healthy and 2 dead trees left. Apart from those reaching their natural age limit, changing environmental conditions may also have affected them. Dicke Tannen is No. 45 in the system of checkpoints forming the Harzer Wandernadel hiking network.
