= South Harz Nature Park =

Nature park in Germany

Coordinates: 51°35′N 10°46′E

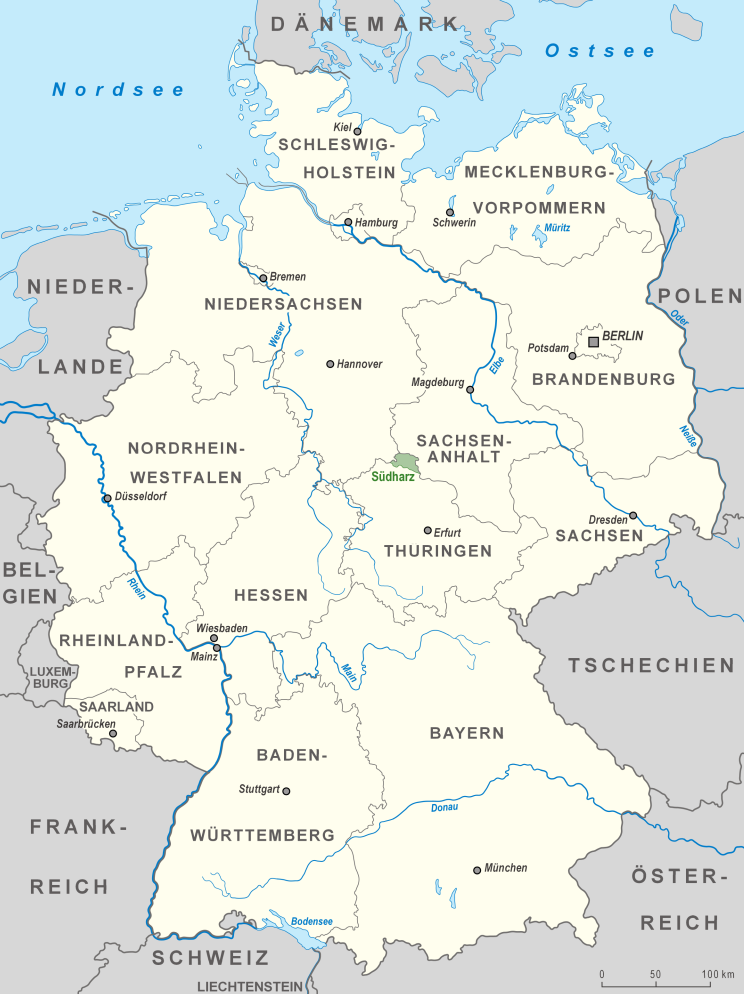
Location of the South Harz Nature Park

The South Harz Nature Park (German: Naturpark Südharz) is located in the county of Nordhausen in north Thuringia, Germany. The act designating this nature park in the Harz Mountains came into force on 31 December 2010 and thus founded the fifth nature park in Thuringia. It has an area of 267 km². The park is managed by the South Harz Tourist Association (Südharzer Tourismusverband e.V.) in conjunction with the Kyffhäuser Nature Park.

The nature park covers parts of the southern foothills of the Lower Harz, the gypsum karst landscape of the adjacent Zechstein belt and the transition region with the North Thuringian bunter sandstone country. In the south, the park is bounded by the valley of the River Helme; on the other sides by the state border of Thuringia. Its western boundary is part of the German Green Belt. To the east is the South Harz Karst Landscape Biosphere Reserve (in Saxony-Anhalt), to the north, the Harz/Saxony-Anhalt Nature Park and to the northwest, the Harz Nature Park (in Lower Saxony). The entire Harz is a so-called major nature reserve (Großschutzgebiet) in which the Harz National Park is also located.

Within the nature park there are ponors, karst springs, subsidence lakes and dolines as well as steep gypsum cliffs. Thanks to the many caves, numerous species of bat - including the barbastelle - live in the beech woods, where they find suitable places to roost. It is also home to the wildcat and lynx. Areas of dry grassland with orchids are the remnants of old meadows and pastures on the karst surfaces.

The highest point in the South Harz Nature Park is the Großer Ehrenberg (635.5 m above sea level (NN)).

== See also ==
- List of nature parks in Germany
