= Harz Nature Park =

Nature park in Germany

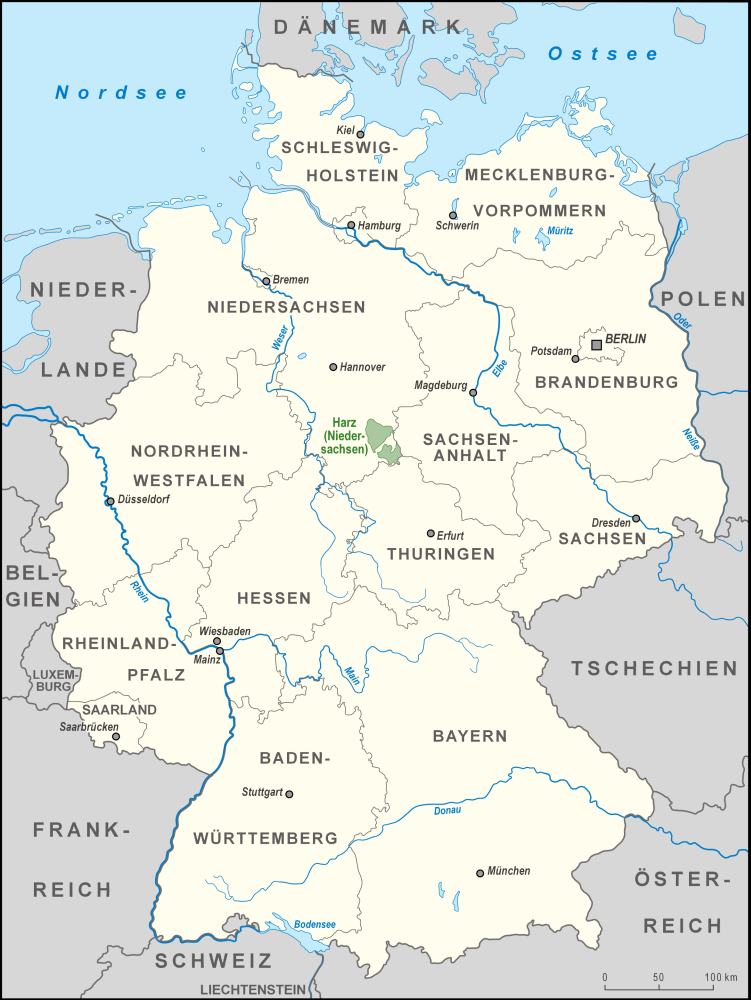
Location of the Harz Nature Park (Lower Saxony)

The Harz (Lower Saxony) Nature Park (German: Naturpark Harz (Niedersachsen)) or just Harz Nature Park lies in the districts of Goslar and Göttingen (in the area of the former Osterode am Harz district) in South Lower Saxony. The nature park in the Harz Mountains was founded in 1960 and is covers an area of around 790 km^{2}. It is run by the Harz Regional Association.

The nature park includes the Upper Harz minus the Lower Saxon parts of the Harz National Park. Its eastern and southeaster boundary is part of the German Green Belt. It borders on the Harz/Saxony-Anhalt Nature Park to the east and the South Harz Nature Park to the southeast, the entire Harz being a single, large protected area (Großschutzgebiet).

In the Harz and thus in the nature park, which is characterised by a rich variety of flora and fauna, are extensive forests, plateaus that are partly used by agriculture, deeply incised valleys with wild river courses and waterfalls, as well as storage ponds and reservoirs. In many places there are signs of a long history of settlement. In addition, there are winter sports areas and the Harz as a whole is a major hiking area.

The highest point in the Harz Nature Park (Lower Saxony) is the Wurmberg (971.2 m above sea level (NN)).

== See also ==
- List of nature parks in Germany
