= Harz/Saxony-Anhalt Nature Park =

Nature park in Germany

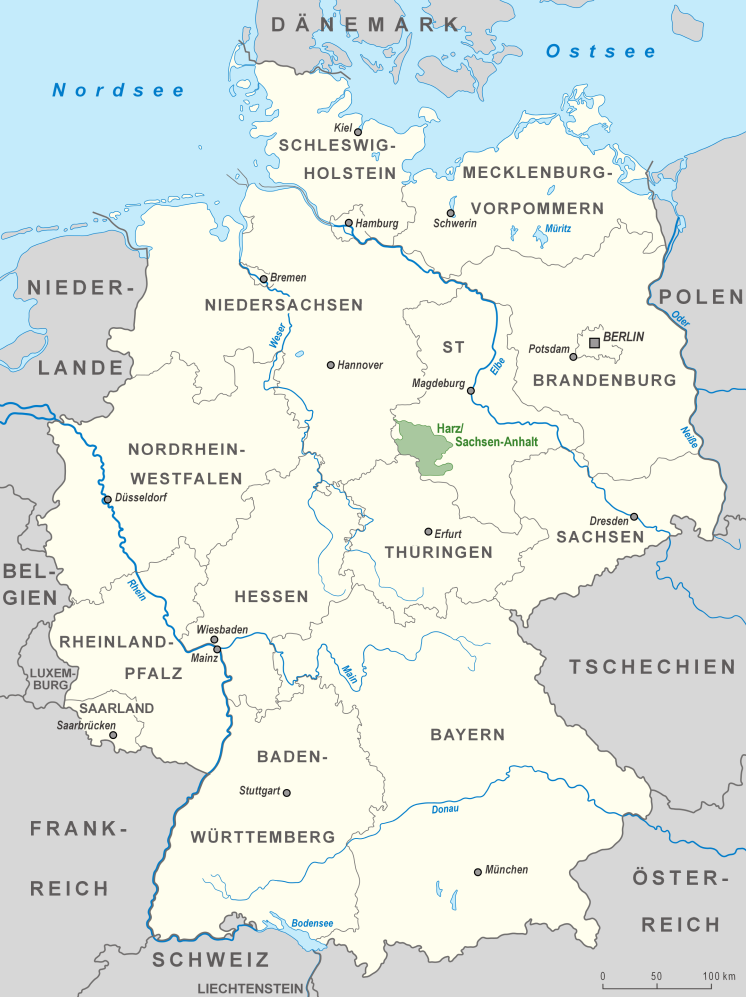
Location of the Harz/Saxony-Anhalt Nature Park

The Harz/Saxony-Anhalt Nature Park (German: Naturpark Harz/Sachsen-Anhalt) is situated n the districts of Harz and Mansfeld-Südharz in the German state of Saxony-Anhalt. The nature park which lies in the Harz Mountains was founded in 2003 and has an area of around 1,660 km^{2}. It is looked after by the Harz Regional Association (Regionalverband Harz).

The park covers the Lower Harz, the massif of Ramberg and parts of Mansfeld Land, as well as the Saxony-Anhalt portion of the Harz National Park in the High Harz. Its western boundary is part of the Grünes Band Deutschland. It borders on the Harz (Lower Saxony) Nature Park roughly to the west and the South Harz Nature Park more or less to the southwest, the entire Harz being a so-called Großschutzgebiet or multi-purpose reserve.

In the Harz in general and the nature park in particular, which is characterised by a rich variety of flora and fauna, are extensive forests, plateaux partly used for agriculture, deeply incised valleys with natural river courses and waterfalls as well as reservoirs and dams. In many places there are signs of a long history of settlement. In addition there are winter sports resorts, and the Harz is a hiking area.

The highest point in the nature park and in the Harz National Park is the legendary Brocken (1,141.1 m above sea level (NN)).

== See also ==
- List of nature parks in Germany
