= German Green Belt =

German environmental project

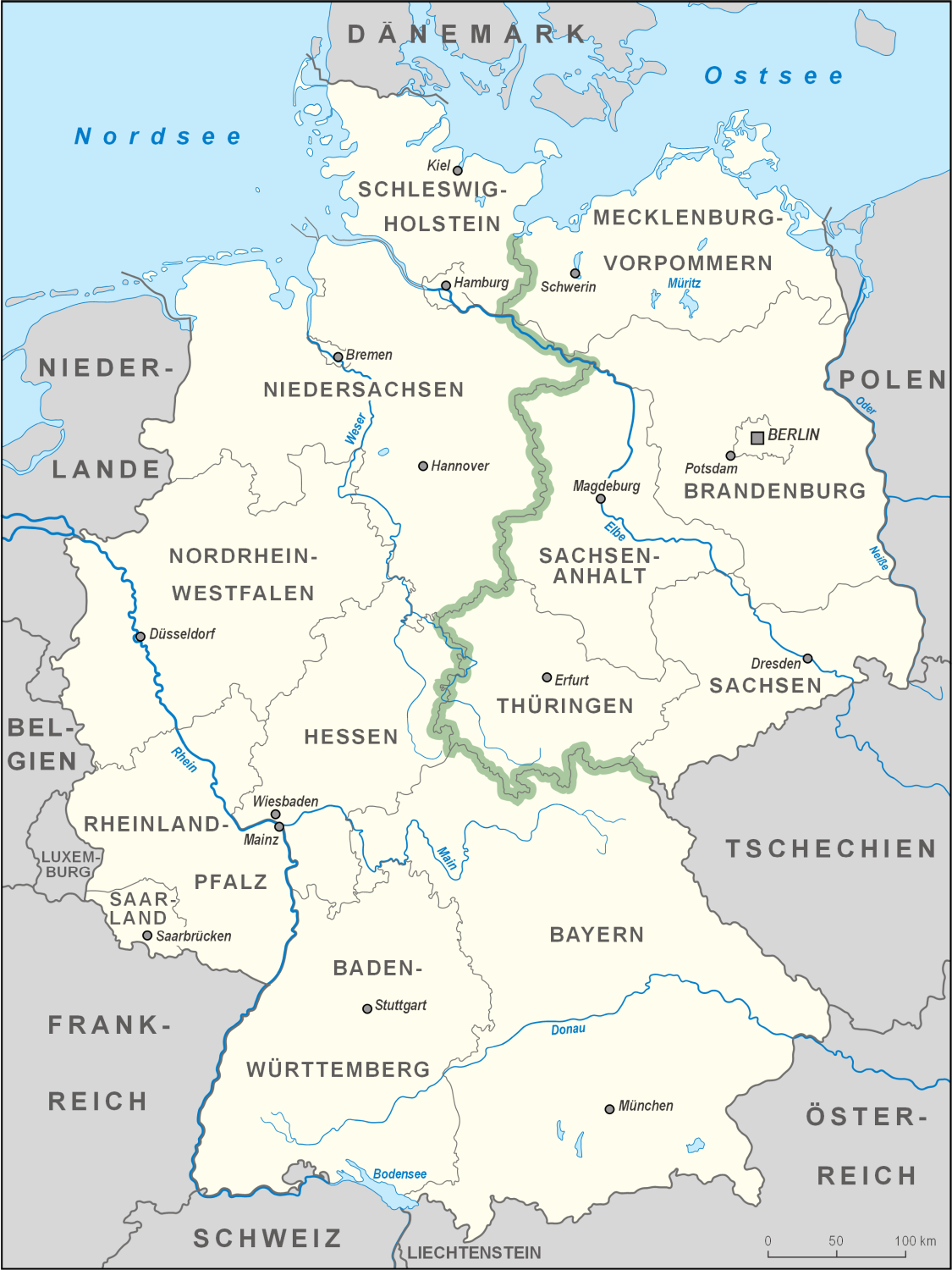
The Green Belt consists of land along the former border between East and West Germany.

The German Green Belt (Grünes Band Deutschland in German) is a project of Bund für Umwelt und Naturschutz Deutschland, one of Germany's largest environmental groups. The project began in 1989 facing the 870-mile (1,400 km) network of inner-German border fences and guard towers formerly separating East and West Germany. It is one of the world's most unusual nature reserves, lying along the old "Death Strip," turning a monument to repression into a symbol of renewal.

While Germany was separated, the border sector became an inaccessible region. Nature was able to develop in a nearly undisturbed environment over this period. This also applied to extensive tracts of adjacent land because they were so cut off. The overall "Green Belt" is characterized by an exceptional wealth of species and habitats, most of which are now endangered, representing a system of interlinked biotopes of national importance, which joins or passes through valuable swathes of land and intensively farmed agricultural landscapes. The federal government, states (Länder) and nature conservation organisations are joining forces to protect this "Green Belt" and develop it into a valuable habitat for humans and nature.

== East and West border ==
=== Construction and purpose ===
The Inner German Border was formally established on 1 July 1945 as the boundary between the Western and Soviet occupation zones of Germany. On the eastern side, it was made one of the world's most heavily fortified frontiers, defined by a continuous line of high metal fences and walls, barbed wire, alarms, anti-vehicle ditches, watchtowers, automatic booby traps and minefields. It was patrolled by 50,000 armed GDR guards who faced tens of thousands of West German, British and US guards and soldiers.

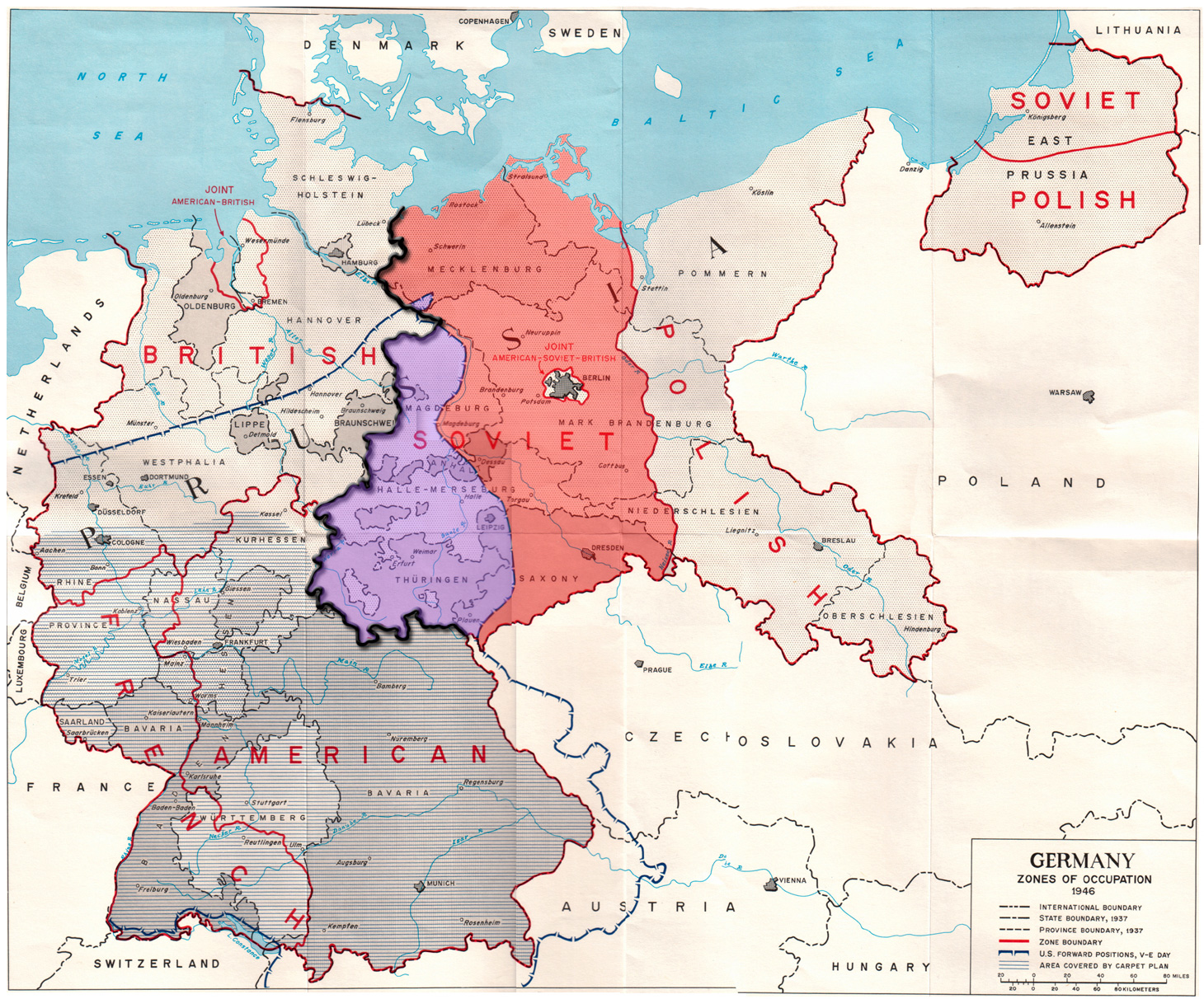
The Allied zones of occupation in post-war Germany, highlighting the Soviet zone (red), the inner German border (heavy black line) and the zone from which British and American troops withdrew in July 1945 (purple). The provincial boundaries are those of Nazi Germany, before the present Länder (federal states) were established.

Despite the extensiveness of the Inner Border, it was the Berlin Wall (German: Berliner Mauer) that would serve as the famous and infamous representation of the "Iron Curtain" and the Cold War. The Berlin Wall was a barrier that divided Berlin from 1961 to 1989, constructed by the German Democratic Republic (GDR, East Germany) starting on 13 August 1961, that completely cut off (by land) West Berlin from surrounding East Germany and from East Berlin until it was opened in November 1989. In practice, the Wall served to prevent the massive emigration and defection that marked East Germany and the communist Eastern Bloc during the post-World War II period.

From the outset, West Germany and the Allies rejected East Germany's legitimacy. The "West" saw the creation of the GDR as an extension of the Soviet Union and an illegitimate heir to German history and culture following World War II. The East German government sought to define the country as a legitimate state in its own right and portrayed West Germany as enemy territory (feindliches Ausland) – a capitalist, semi-fascist state that exploited its citizens, sought to regain the lost territories of the Third Reich, and stood opposed to the peaceful socialism of the GDR.

=== Fortifications ===
The GDR side of the Inner German Border had by far a more complex system of fortifications and border controls than the Federal Republic of Germany (FRG). 1,393 kilometers (866 miles) long and between 50 and 200 metres wide, the German portion ran from the Baltic Sea to Czechoslovakia with the entire "Iron Curtain" extending from the Arctic to the Black Sea. The border fortifications were indeed formidable with visible electrified fences with barbed wire, guard towers, heavily armed guards, and mine fields.

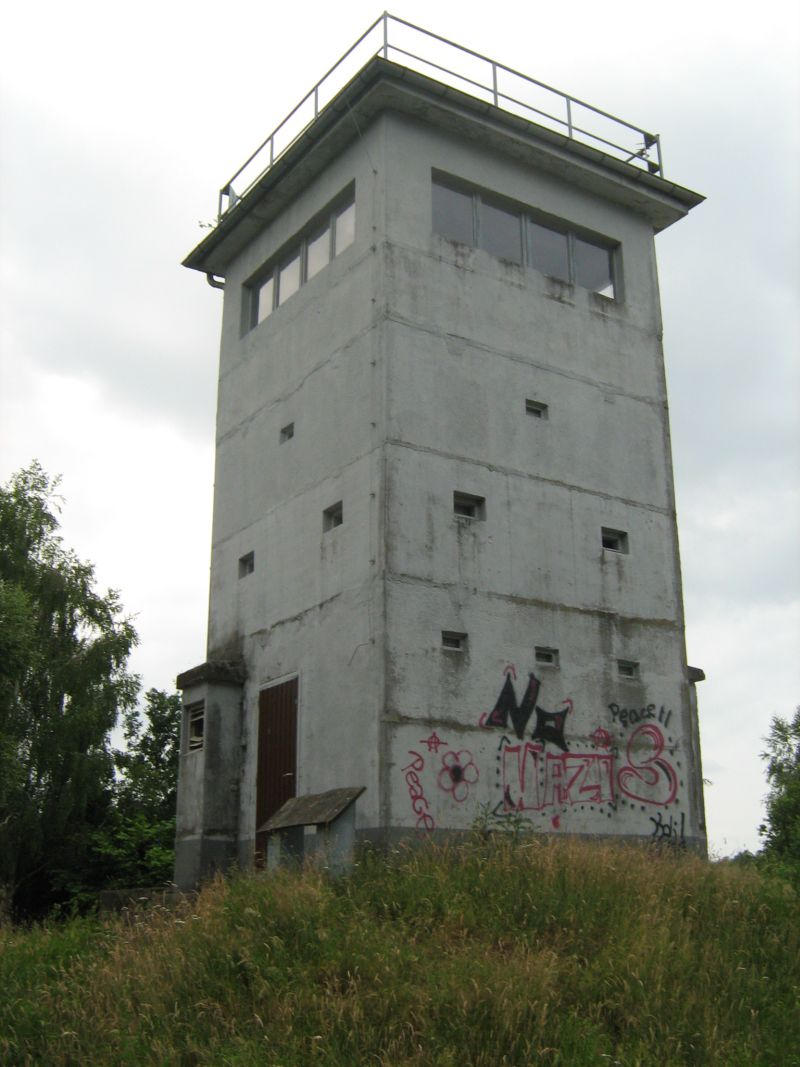
Wachturm Böckwitz-Zicherie

The first area which one would have encountered along the border, traveling from east to west, would have been the "restrictive zone" (Sperrzone). This section was a 5 kilometers (3.1 miles) wide area running parallel to the border to which access was heavily restricted with permits and checkpoints. On the far side of this zone was the signal fence (Signalzaun), a continuous expanded metal fence 1,185 kilometers (736 miles) long and 2 meters (6.6 feet) high. It was lined with low-voltage electrified strands of barbed wire and when the wire was touched or cut, an alarm was activated to alert nearby guards. Behind this fencing came the heavily guarded "protective strip" (Schutzstreifen). This area, that ran adjacent to the actual GDR border, was monitored by guards in large watchtowers constructed at regular intervals along the entire length of the border with almost 700 towers built by 1989. These towers made it possible for East German guards to fire upon anyone attempting an escape.

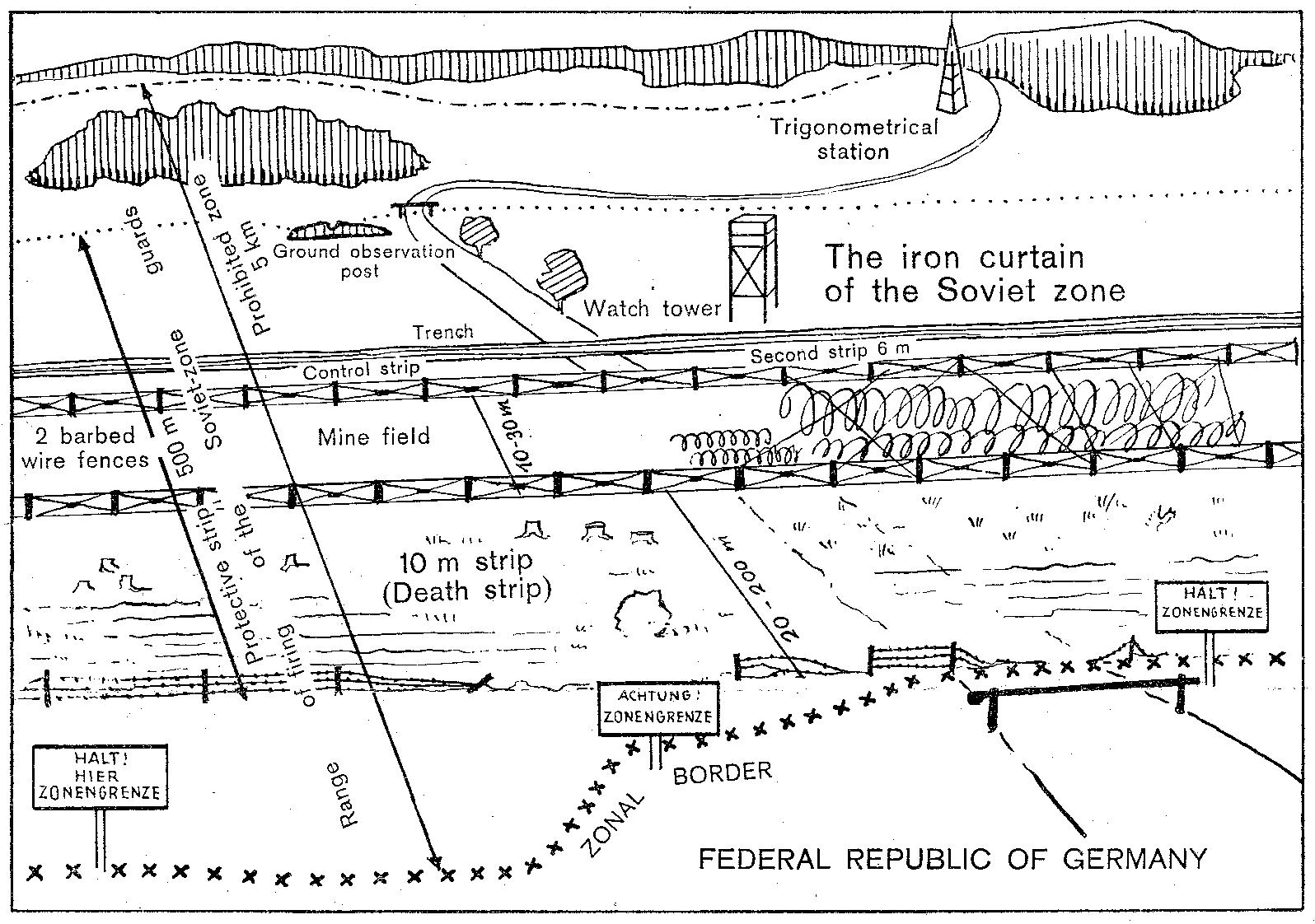
Annotated diagram of the second-generation inner German border system in the early 1960s

With these defensive defensive measures in place, this "death strip" of land was referred to as "no-man's land." It would be fitting that the former "no-mans land" would become the future "Green Belt." From a nature conservation standpoint, the Iron Curtain was a blessing, a vast strip of land in which wildlife thrived. Freed for 40 years from disturbance, as e.g. hunting and farming, wild animals and plants prospered.

== Becoming the "Green Belt" ==
=== History ===
For four decades the "Iron Curtain" formed an almost insurmountable physical and ideological border in Europe. Soon political change would be instigated in 1989, when on 19 August the "Pan-European Picnic" took place on the Hungarian-Austrian border, close to the town of Sopron. This crucial moment marked the beginning of the end of the GDR and the dismantling of its extensive border. Due to the strong commitment of nature conservationists, the border between East and West Germany became Europe's biggest nature reserve: an 870-mile "ecological treasure trove." It is no longer the Iron Curtain but the Green Belt, and home to more than 1200 rare and endangered species of birds, mammals, plants and insects.

The history of the Green Belt does not just begin with the fall of the Berlin Wall but earlier with the beginning interest of young bird specialists of the BUND in the border region between Bavaria and Thuringia. The creation of the Bund für Umwelt und Naturschutz Deutschland (BUND), part of the larger organization Friends of the Earth was created on July 20, 1975, BUND by Horst Stern, Prof. Bernhard Grzimek, Dr. Herbert Gruhl, Enoch zu Guttenberg, Hubert Weinzierl, Hubert Weiger and 16 other environmentalists. From the Western side of the border, the BUND was able to see different bird species, among other animals, thriving in such a hostile environment. In this way nature conservationists from the Bavarian branch of the BUND have been charting the natural features of the border corridor from the Western side since 1975, verifying the great diversity of species and habitats of the former death zone.

In December 1989, the BUND organised the first all-German meeting with 400 nature conservationists from East and West, at the Bavarian-Saxon border in Hof. Here the concept and name of the "Green Belt" was born, and the first resolution was unanimously made to protect it. 13 years later, during the inauguration by Mikhail Gorbachev of the LandArt project "West-Eastern Gate" in the Eichsfeld, the vision of the European Green Belt was established.

=== Planning and implementation ===
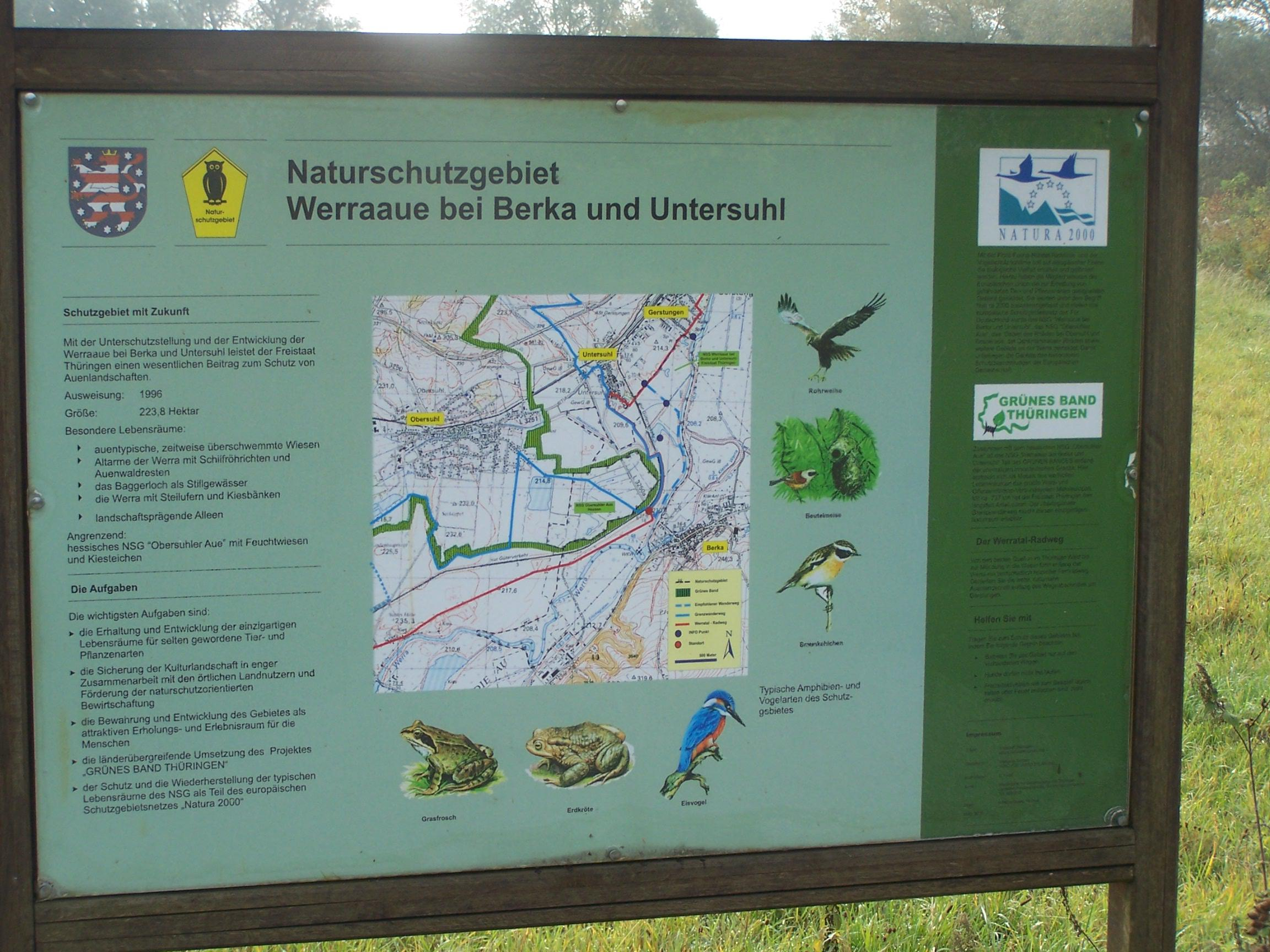
Information board near Gerstungen

Less than a month after the GDR opened its border with the FRG on 9 December 1989 organizers began working to create the Green Belt. The efforts of the BUND early on have spurred collaborations with the federal government to ensure the future of conservation with a reunited Germany. The BUND wanted that the border area "should be protected as the ecological backbone of Central Europe" and to ensure this, help was needed since most Germans wanted to get rid of anything that stirred bad memories of the past.

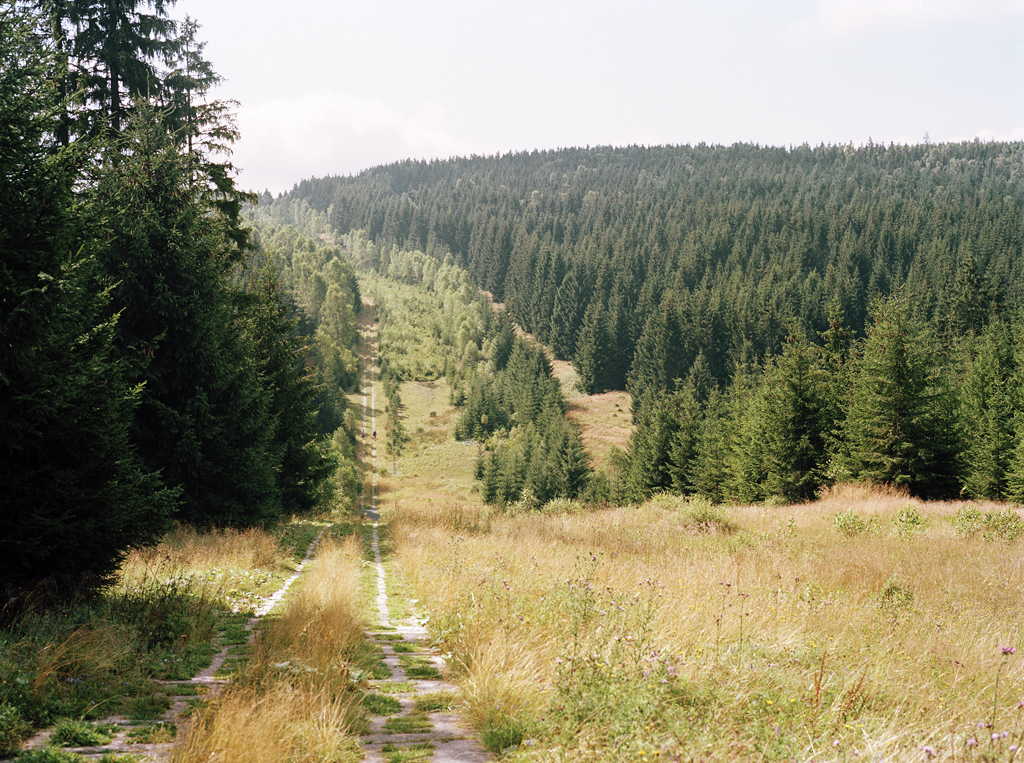
View along the Green Belt near Sorge

In order to prove the value of the land, the BUND and the Federal Agency for Nature Conservation (BfN) worked in collaboration and began a painstaking inventory of the ecosystems and species along the Green Belt. This included teams of ornithologists, botanists, and entomologists walking hundreds of kilometers recording what they saw and collecting data from locals in each area.

The Federal Agency for Nature Conservation called for the creation of large formal reserves in as many areas as possible along the Green Belt, which would form the spine of a new German-wide system of ecological corridors. The formation of these reserves were crucial to preserving the biodiversity created at the border. With the border being almost untouched by humans, it rapidly turned into a natural wilderness with threatened species of all types living there.

In 2002, Mikhail Gorbachev endorsed the initiative. Gorbachev became the first person to buy a "Green Belt share" which had opened the doors for people to give money to BUND (Friends of the Earth) to purchase land. Those involved in these efforts were relieved when in 2005 German Chancellor Angela Merkel designated the Green Belt as part of Germany's National Natural Heritage and was highlighted in the German government's National Strategy on Biological Diversity. In 2010 the process of transferring federal land comprising part of the National Natural Heritage in the Green Belt free of charge to the various states (Länder) and their nature conservation foundations was completed.

=== Route ===
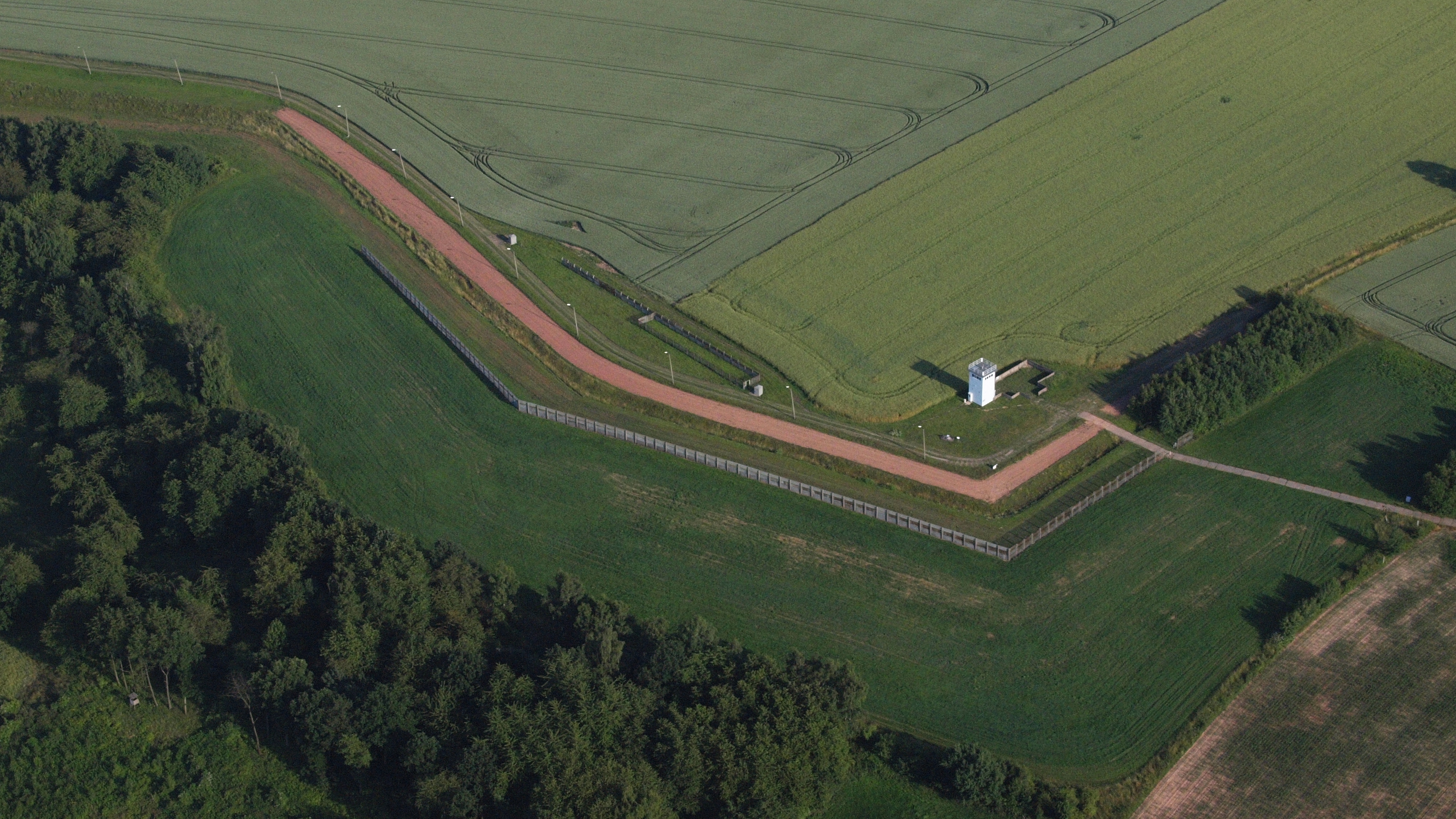
Aerial view of the hiking trail along the Green Belt at the Borderland Museum Eichsfeld in Central Germany.

The German Green Belt straddles the 1,393-kilometer (866-mile) former east–west border and is an integral part of the larger former "Iron Curtain" border. It runs predominantly on the eastern side of the former border. Therefore, the Green Belt passes through six federal states (Mecklenburg-West Pomerania, Brandenburg, Lower Saxony, Saxony-Anhalt, Thuringia, Saxony) and touches the border section of three more federal states (Schleswig-Holstein, Hessen, Bavaria). It traverses most of the major land regions in Germany, which makes it the backbone of the green infrastructure and biodiversity network in Germany.

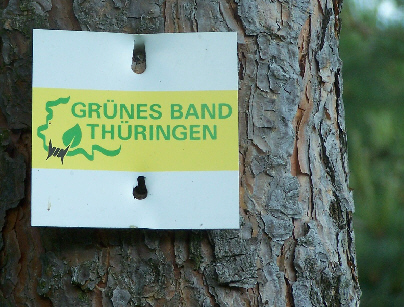
Hiking sign in Thuringia

Further on, environmentalists have been working to extend the Green Belt beyond the German borders to reflect the larger "Iron Curtain" of the former Soviet states. The European Green Belt has evolved along the former Iron Curtain and runs the length of Europe, from the Barents Sea in the north to the Adriatic and the Black Sea in the south. In all, it extends for over 12,500 km along the borders of 24 states.

== Conservation ==
The Green Belt was also called so for the simple fact that the color green is in abundance along the route. Part of the effort to understand the biodiversity surveying and development project "Green Belt Inventory" was carried out by the BUND with its Project Office Green Belt and supported by the BfN (the Federal Agency for Nature Conservation) in 2002. The results of the "longest" inventory ever undertaken by the German nature conservationists underline the outstanding ecological value of the 1,393 km-long and 177 km^{2} large network of habitats. In 2012 the inventory has been updated. Together with actual data on conservation areas, status and management the following characteristics picture the Green Belt:

- 146 different types of habitats
- 64% of endangered habitat types according to the Red List of Germany
- 85% under severe protection
- 98% are designates as Natura 2000 and flora-fauna habitats (under protection of EU Habitats Directive)
- 60% running/standing water bodies, extensive grassland, fallow land and woods
- 88% of the area is still close-to-nature

The diversity of the landscape is an important refuge and home to many plant and animal species: rare orchids like the lady's slipper, the clubtail dragonfly, the marsh fritillary, the whinchat, the red-backed shrike, the black stork, the kingfisher and the otter.

Even though most of the Green Belt is owned by governmental and non-governmental organisations, still a huge area belongs to private owners.

Since November 2018 the complete Thuringian part of the Green Belt Germany is under protection as "Nationales Naturmonument" (National Nature Monument). In October 2019 the complete stretch of the Saxony-Anhalt border has been designated as well. The other bordering federal states also declared the aim to designate the Green Belt as a National Nature Monument in the upcoming years.

== Tourism ==
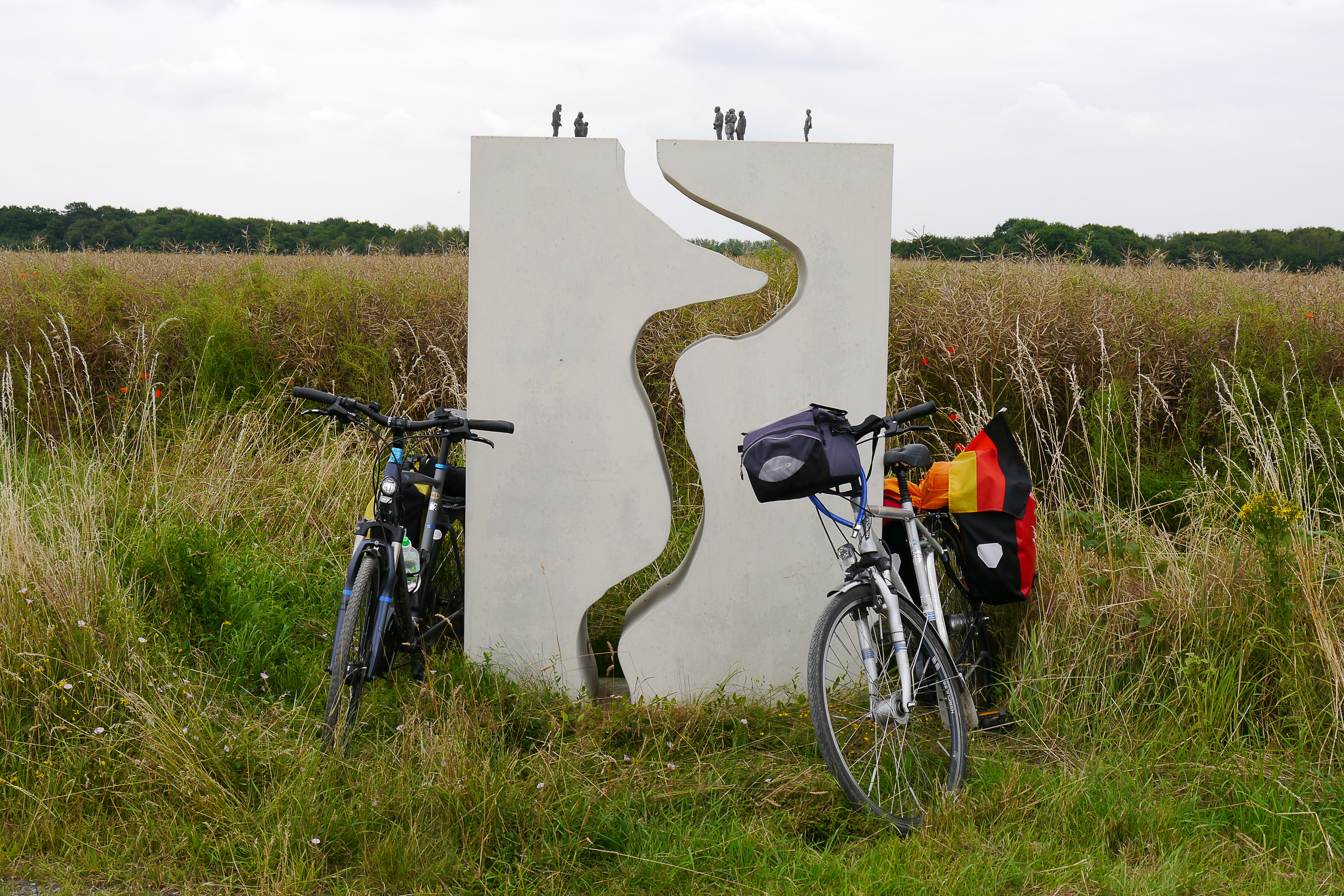
Monument Wiedelah-Suderode

The efforts of the BUND, the BfN, and the local states have led to using the Green Belt for both conservation and nature tourism. The Green Belt is a landscape of memories. Not only does it have unique natural aspects, it is at the same time a living monument to German reunification. This unique combination of nature, culture and history is the basis of the "Experience Green Belt" project, a collaboration with individual states, the BUND and BfN. Kai Frobel of BUND described the Green Belt as a way for conservation and nature tourism to work together. Nature conservation is combined with sustainable tourism in the regions of Thuringian Forest & Slate Mountains / Franconian Forest, Elbe-Altmark-Wendland and the Harz mountains. Each of these regions would help towards realizing the Green Belt's tourist potential in terms of nature, culture and history and hence also to enhancing its popular appreciation in the region.

These "regions" include:

- Elbe – Altmark – Wendland: Grenzerfahrungen im Vierländereck (about experiencing former border territory spanning four different German states)
- Harz: Harz ohne Grenzen – Auf Harzer Grenzwegen durch Natur und Geschichte (with the focus on natural and cultural history along the former east–west border through the Harz region)
- Thüringer Wald and Schiefergebirge/Frankenwald: Das Grüne Band (inter)aktiv erleben (about actively and interactively experiencing the Green Belt in the Thuringian and Franconian forests)

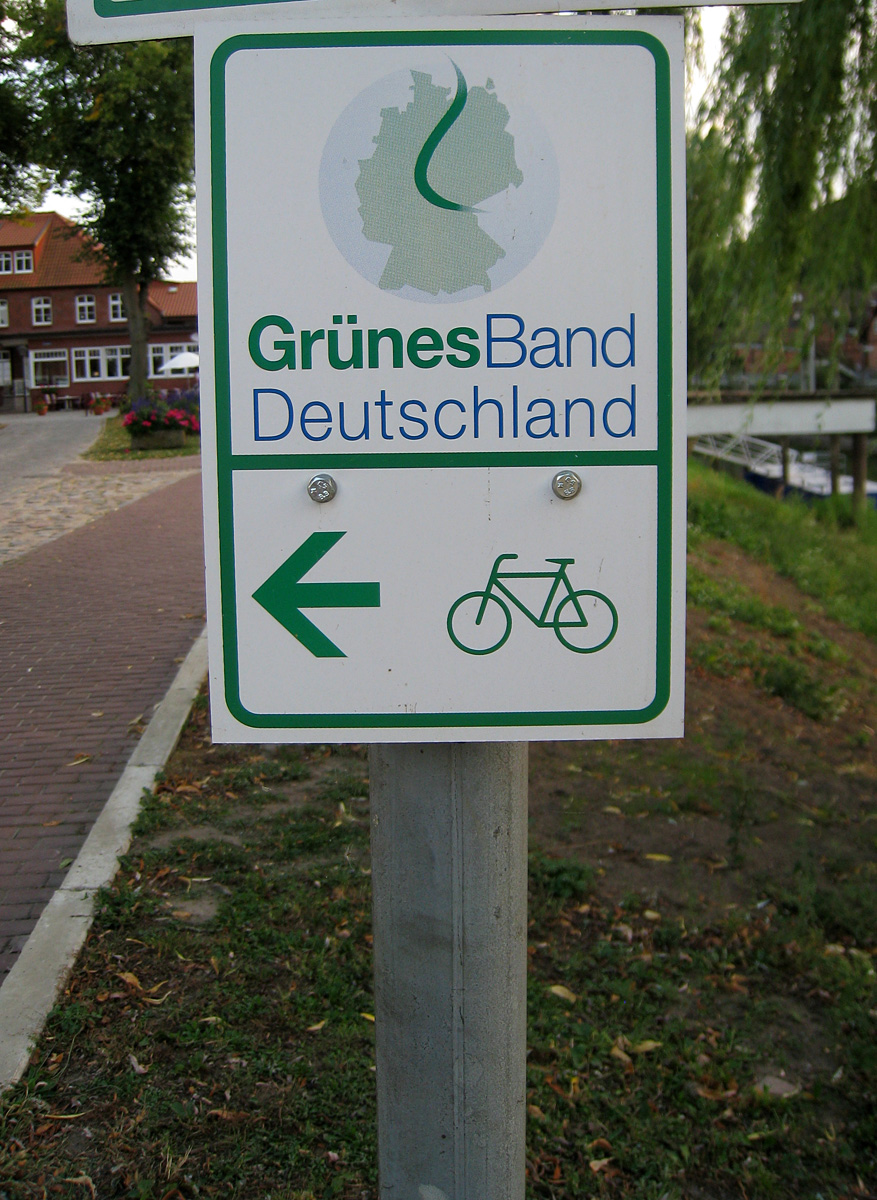
Grünes Band Deutschland cycling route

Work completed in the three model regions between 2007 and 2010 established a range of landscape management measures, uniform signage along the entire stretch, specially marked cycle and walking paths, exhibitions and displays, information points depicting events along the former border, and specially developed nature-experience and tourism offerings. The aim was not only to overcome administrative barriers such as between district administrations and Länder governments, but also to erase the lines of division between those who work in nature conservation, agriculture, tourism and the upkeep of historical monuments.

As an ambitious conservation project, there are still a number of tasks; one of the largest is creating more formally designated protected areas and closing the 12% of gaps in the Green Belt. The Green Belt has become an important part of Germany's tourist industry. At points along the route, visitors can call a toll-free mobile phone number and listen to witnesses' accounts of the border.

== Criticism ==
The state of Thuringia requires infrastructure projects like overground and underground cables, federal and state roads, and railways to obtain environmental and monument protection permission to cross the Green Belt. This has hampered the development of SuedLink, a high-voltage cable intended to transport renewable electricity across German states from the north to the south.

The environmental speaker of the German Farmers' Association argued in 2013 that the Green Belt risked becoming a 'Green Border' if additional nature reserves along it impeded farming. He said that other than nature conservation, a return to farming and forestry on the Belt could also be seen as a symbol for German reunification. In 2019, some members of the public in the state of Saxony-Anhalt similarly described the belt as a new form of dividing Germany's East and West.

== See also ==
- Green belt
- European Green Belt
- Korean Demilitarized Zone For a similar situation
