= List of mountains and hills of Lower Saxony =

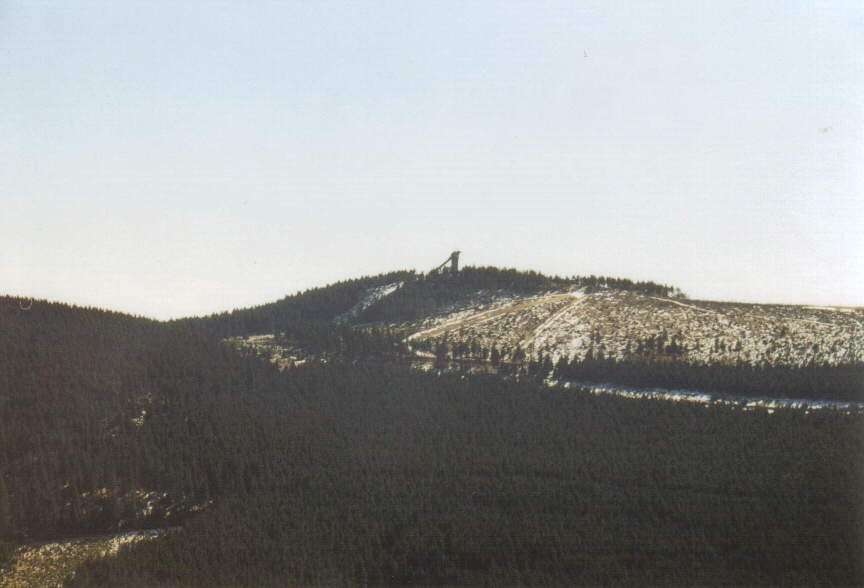
Wurmberg, highest mountain in Lower Saxony; View from the Brocken Railway line

This List of mountains and hills in Lower Saxony shows a selection of high or well-known mountains and hills in the German state of Lower Saxony (in order of height). Although there is no universally agreed definition of a 'mountain', summits at 2.000 feet (610 metres) or higher may generally be referred to as mountains; those below 2.000 feet as 'hills', hence the division of this list. By this definition, it can be seen that all the mountains in Lower Saxony occur in the Harz.

== Highest points in Lower Saxony's regions ==
The following table lists the highest points in the various landscapes (hill ranges or regions) of Lower Saxony.

In the "Landscape" column, major hill ranges are shown in bold. Clicking "List" in the rows of the "List" column links to other hills or mountains in that landscape – some of which are outside Lower Saxony. The table is arranged by height, but may be sorted by other criteria by clicking the symbol of the desired column.

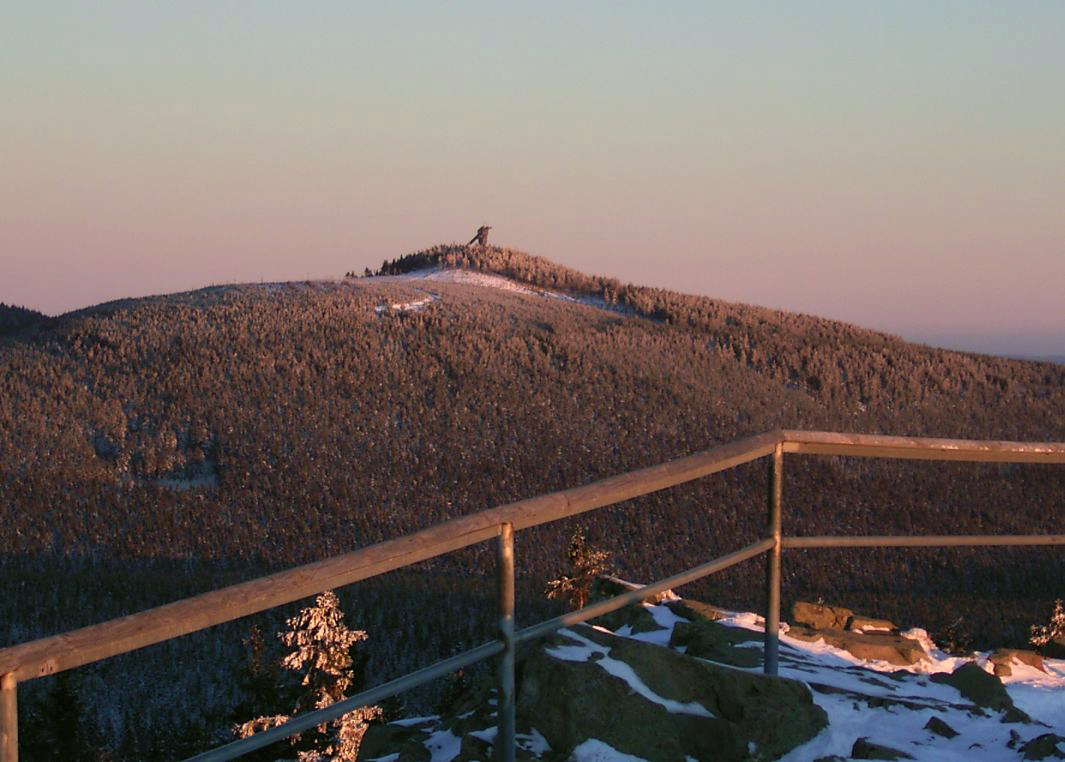
Wurmberg (Harz)

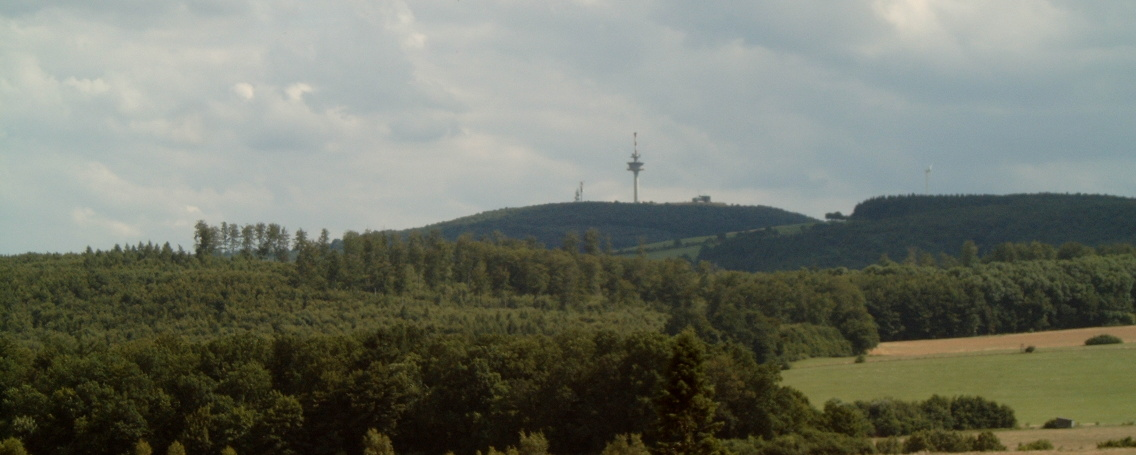
Hoher Hagen (Dransfeld Municipal Forest)

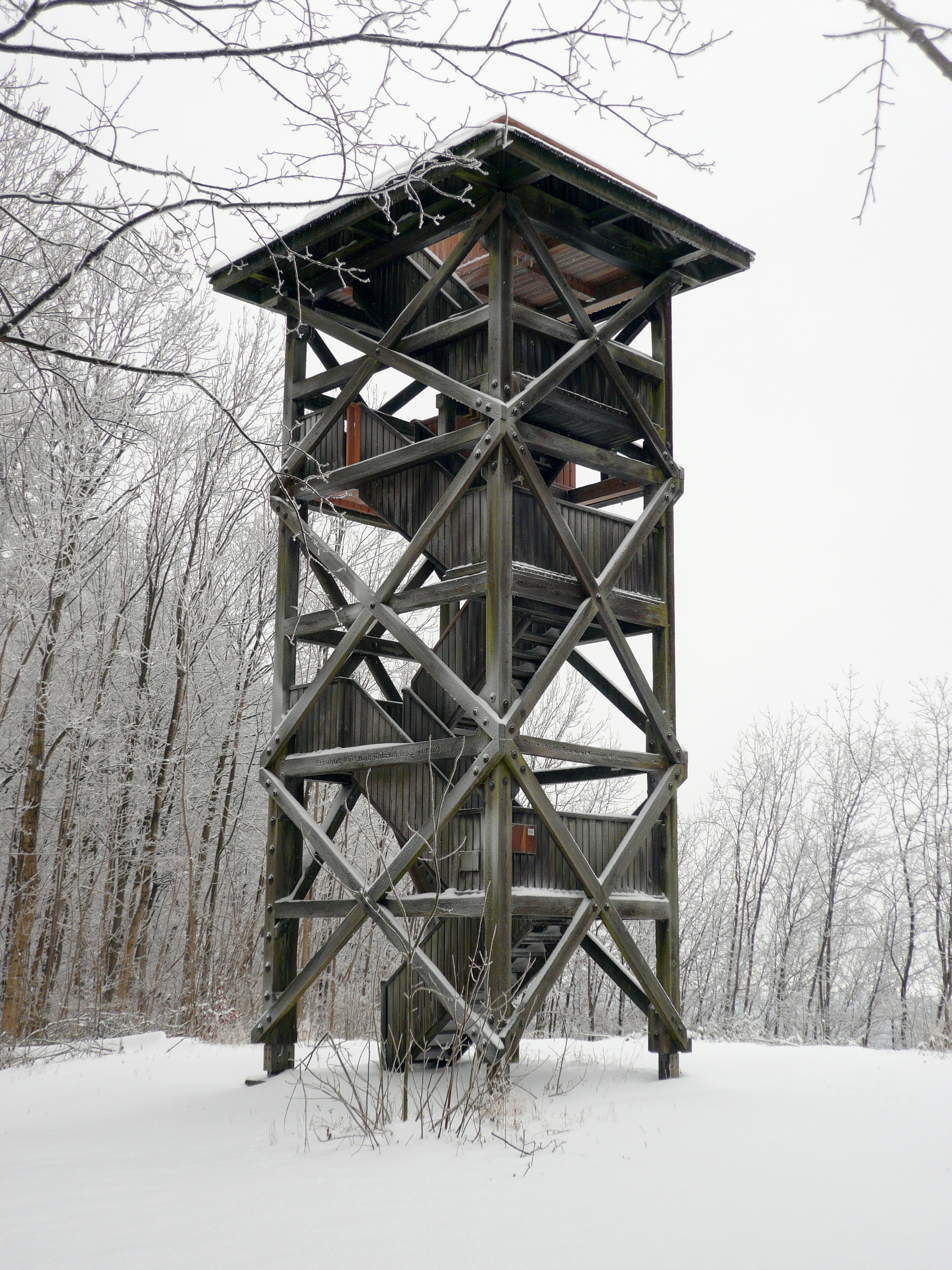
Mackenröder Spitze (Göttingen Forest)

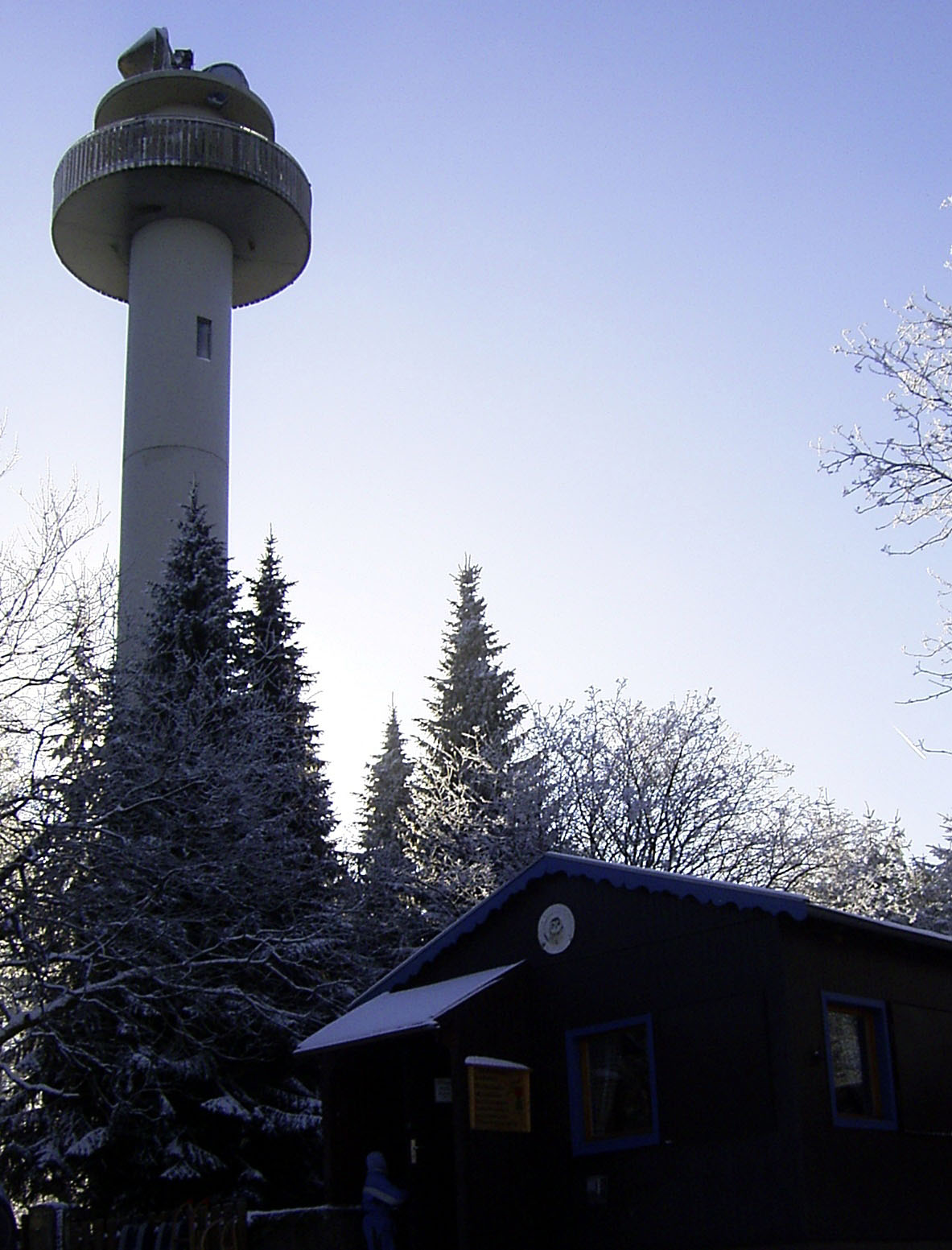
Bröhn (Deister)

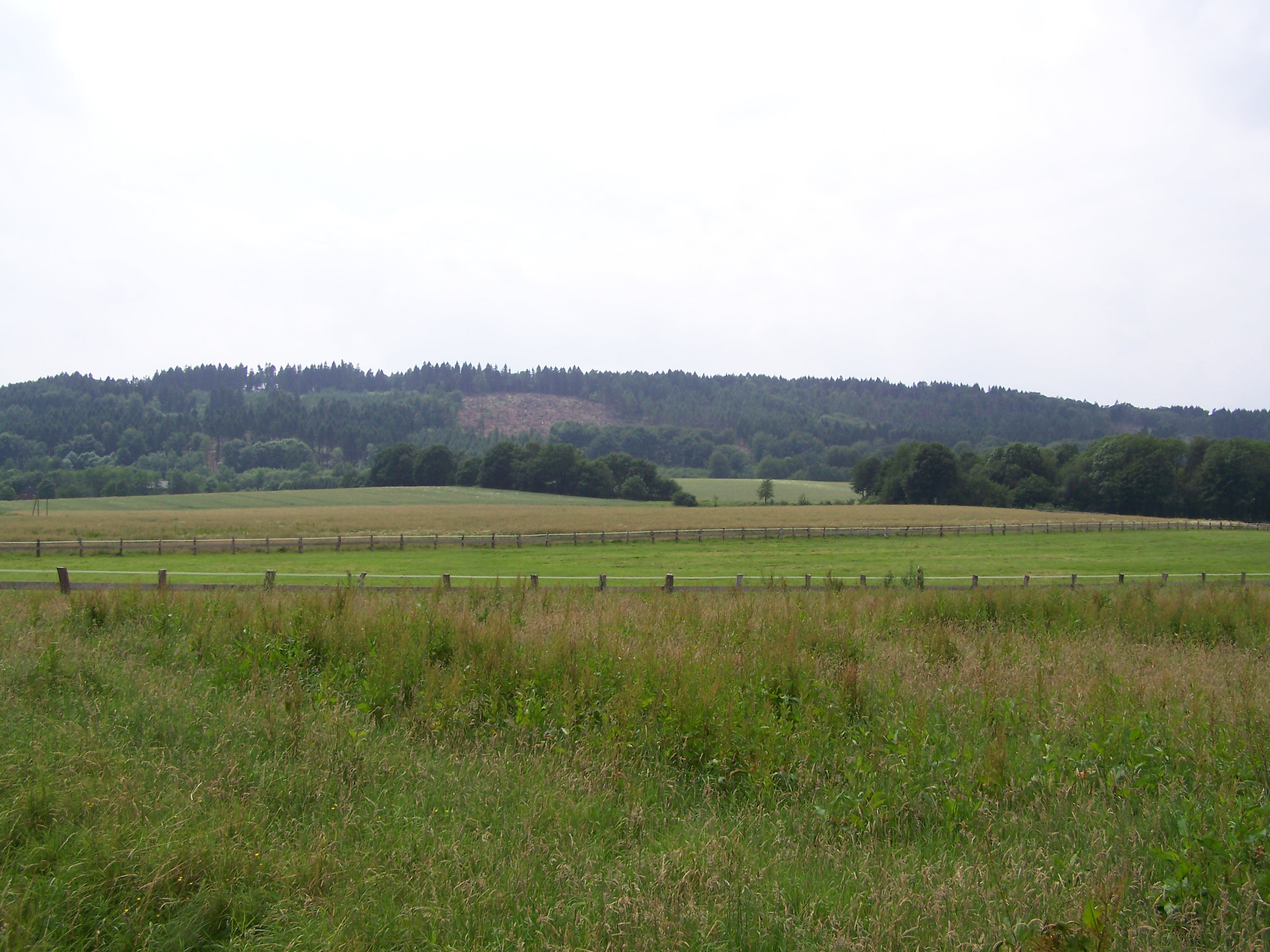
Hüggel (Hüggel)

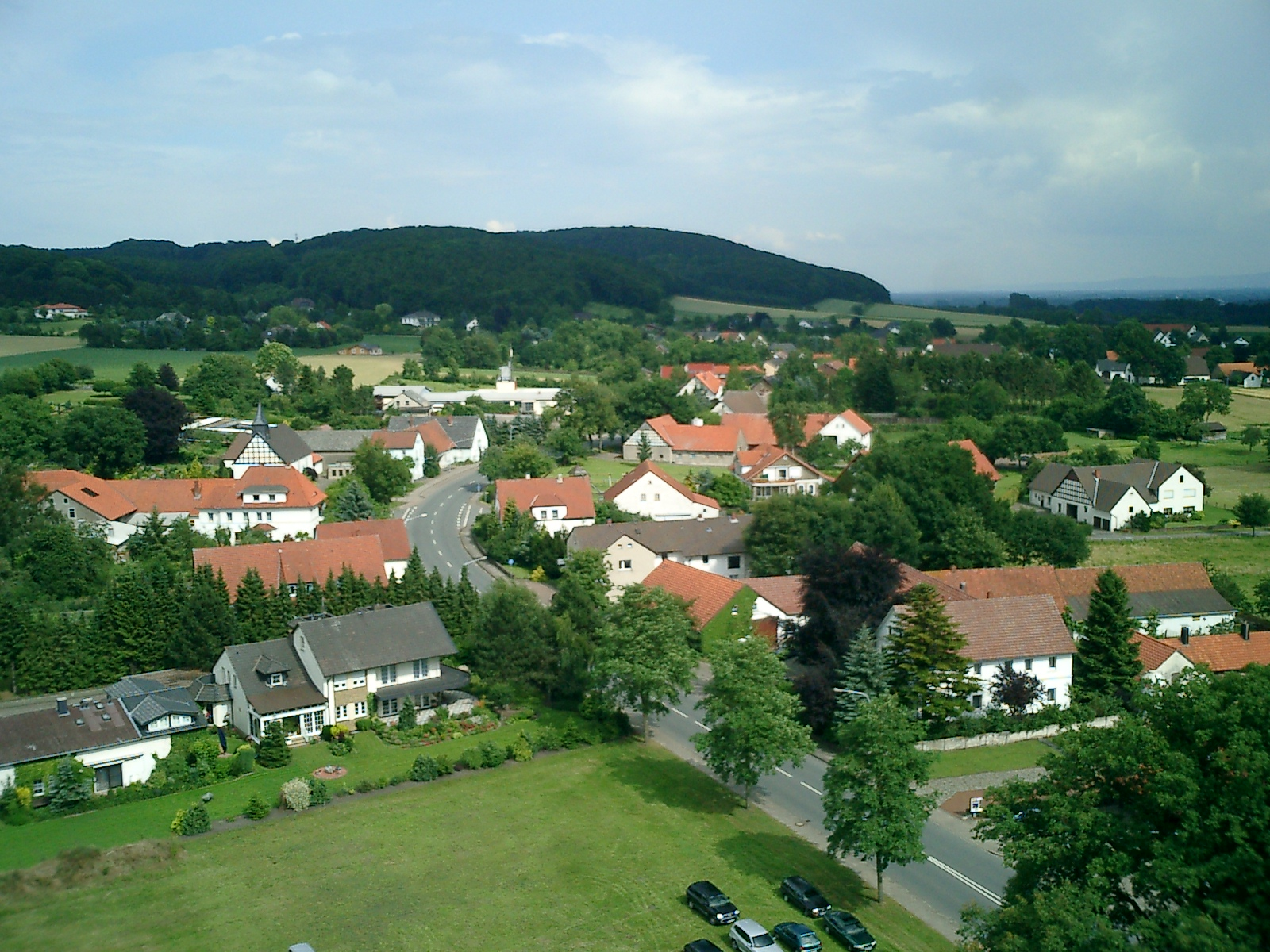
Kollwesshöh (Stemweder Berg)

Mountain / hill	Height (m)	Landscape	List	District(s) or town(s)
Wurmberg	971.2	**Harz**	List	Goslar
Haferberg	580.4	**Kaufungen Forest**	List	Göttingen
Große Blöße	527.8	**Solling**	List	Northeim
Köterberg; High point in LS: NRW summit:	495; 495; 495.8	Lippe Uplands	---	Holzminden
Bloße Zelle	480.4	Hils	List	Hildesheim, Holzminden
Hoher Hagen (Hoher Hagen)	480	Dransfeld Municipal Forest	List	Göttingen
Ebersnacken	460.4	Vogler	List	Holzminden
Holzberg	444.5	Holzberg	List	Holzminden
Kanstein	441	Thüster Berg	---	Hameln-Pyrmont
Lauensteiner Kopf	439	Ith	List	Hameln-Pyrmont
Hohe Egge (Süntel)	437.5	Süntel	List	Hameln-Pyrmont
Mackenröder Spitze	427.5	Göttingen Forest	List	Göttingen
Fast	419.2	Osterwald	List	Hameln-Pyrmont
Sackberg	411.4	Ahlsburg	List	Northeim
Helleberg	409.6	Elfas	List	Holzminden
Totenberg	408	Bramwald	List	Göttingen
Bröhn	405.0	Deister	List	Hanover Region
unnamed summit	406.1	Homburg Forest	List	Holzminden
Hohe Egge (Selter)	395.0	Selter	List	Hildesheim, Holzminden, Northeim
Hohe Tafel	395	Sieben Berge	List	Hildesheim
Belzer Berg	392.2	Amtsberge	List	Northeim
Balos	379	Weper	List	Northeim
Grasberg	378.2	Nesselberg	List	Hameln-Pyrmont; Hanover
Ahrensberg	374	Sackwald	List	Hildesheim
Diebische Ecke	367	Bückeberg	List	Schaumburg
Griesberg	358.9	Hildesheim Forest	List	Hildesheim
Burgberg	355.0	Burgberg	List	Holzminden
Hainberg	353	Vorberge	List	Hildesheim
Wolfsköpfe	345.7	Kleiner Deister	List	Hanover Region
Fuchshöhlenberg	346.2	Hube	List	Northeim
Dörenberg	331.2	**Teutoburg Forest**	List	Osnabrück
Babenstein	331	Duinger Berg	---	Hildesheim
Möncheberg	326.1	Weser Uplands	List	Schaumburg
Reuberg	328.2	Reuberg	---	Hildesheim, Holzminden
Eilumer Horn	323.3	Elm	List	Wolfenbüttel
Hohe Dehne	317.6	Heber	List	Hildesheim
Rotenberg	317.3	Rotenberg	List	Göttingen, Osterode am Harz
Hammersteinshöhe	317	Sauberge	List	Hildesheim
Bärenkopf	307.0	Salzgitter Ridge	List	Goslar
Steinberg	300.3	Steinberg	---	Hildesheim; Holzminden
Kalter Buschkopf	299	Hainberg	List	Wolfenbüttel
Riesberg	290	Harplage	List	Hildesheim
unnamed summit	260	Külf	---	Hildesheim
Harlyberg	255.9	Harly Forest	---	Goslar
Buchberg	255	Weinberg	---	Hildesheim
Adlershorst	254.2	Lichtenberge (part of the Salzgitter Ridge)	List	Salzgitter (independent town)
Knebelberg	243	Vorholz	List	Hildesheim
Remlinger Herse	234	Asse	List	Wolfenbüttel
Hüggel	225.6	Hüggel	List	Osnabrück
Großer Kellenberg and Schwarzer Brink	211	**Wiehen Hills**	List	Osnabrück
Hungerberg	205	Oderwald	List	Wolfenbüttel
Süllberg	198.2	Calenberg Land	List	Hanover
Fuchsberg	181	Dorm	---	Helmstedt
unnamed summit	173.3	Benther Berg	---	Hanover Region
Wilseder Berg	169.2	Lüneburg Heath	List	Heidekreis
unnamed summit	162.6	Giesen Hills	---	Hildesheim
Brunnenberg	161.4	Rehburg Hills	List	Nienburg/Weser
Burgberg	155	Gehrdener Berg	---	Hanover Region
Hülsenberg	155	Harburg Hills (part of the Black Hills)	List; List	Harburg
Signalberg	146	Damme Hills	List	Vechta
Hoher Mechtin	142	Drawehn	---	Lüchow-Dannenberg
Trillenberg	140	Ankum Heights	List	Osnabrück
Feldbrink	128.1	Stemweder Berg	List	Diepholz
unnamed summit	122.8	Stemmer Berg	List	Hanover Region
Kettelsberg	108.1	Gehn	List	Osnabrück
Flidderberg	107	Lohberge (part of the Black Hills)	List	Harburg
Hüttenberg	101	Grinderwald	List	Hanover Region; Nienburg/Weser
Otterberg	101	Tostedt Geest (part of the Zeven Geest)	---	Harburg
Windmühlenberg	90	Lingener Höhe	List	Emsland
Silberberg	74	Wingst	List	Cuxhaven
Windberg	73	Hümmling	List	Emsland
Litberg	65	Stade Geest	---	Stade
Gieren- & Kistenberg	23	Osenberge	---	Oldenburg

== Mountains (2000 feet or higher) ==
Name, Height in metres above NN, Location (District/Region); three "???" mean unknown or not yet discovered; please contribute!

1. Wurmberg (971.2 m (3,186 ft)), Goslar district, Harz
2. Bruchberg (927 m), Goslar district, Harz
3. Achtermannshöhe (926 m), Goslar district, Harz
4. Rehberg (893 m), Goslar district, Harz
5. Quitschenberg (882 m), Goslar district, Harz
6. Auf dem Acker (860 m), Osterode am Harz district, Harz
7. Großer Sonnenberg (853.4 m), Goslar district, Harz
8. Kleiner Sonnenberg (853.0 m), Goslar district, Harz
9. Großer Breitenberg (811 m), Osterode am Harz district, Harz
10. Lärchenkopf (801 m), Goslar district, Harz
11. Schalke (762 m), Goslar district, Harz
12. Abbenstein (756m), Goslar district, Harz
13. Haspelkopf (749 m), Goslar district, Harz
14. Kuppe (729 m), Goslar district, Harz
15. Bocksberg (727 m), Goslar district, Harz
16. Kahler Berg (727 m), Goslar district, Harz
17. Jordanshöhe (723 m), Goslar district, Harz
18. Stöberhai (720 m), Osterode am Harz district, Harz
19. Kleiner Breitenberg (711 m), Osterode am Harz district, Harz
20. Großer Knollen (688 m), Osterode am Harz district, Harz
21. Aschentalshalbe (685 m), Osterode am Harz district, Harz
22. Koboltstaler Köpfe (673 m), Goslar district, Harz
23. Wolfskopf (669 m), Goslar district, Harz
24. Ravensberg (659 m), Osterode am Harz district, Harz
25. Beerberg (658 m), Goslar district, Harz
26. Übelsberg (651.3 m), Osterode am Harz district, Harz
27. Braakberg (646 m), Osterode am Harz district, Harz
28. Mathias-Schmidt-Berg (645 m), Goslar district, Harz
29. Rammelsberg (635 m), Goslar district, Harz
30. Kleiner Knollen (631 m), Osterode am Harz district, Harz
31. Großer Wurzelnberg (625.8 m), Osterode am Harz district, Harz
32. Hasselkopf, (612 m), Goslar district, Harz
33. Kleiner Wurzelnberg (610 m), Osterode am Harz district, Harz

== Hills (under 2000 feet) ==
1. Großer Trogtaler Berg (609 m), Goslar district, Harz
2. Langfast (606 m (1,988 ft)), Goslar district, Harz
3. Schadenbeeksköpfe (605 m), Osterode am Harz district, Harz
4. Adlersberg (593.2 m), Osterode am Harz district, Harz
5. Höxterberg (584 m), Osterode am Harz district, Harz
6. Gropenbornskopf (581.2 m), Osterode am Harz district, Harz
7. Haferberg (581 m), Göttingen district, Kaufungen Forest
8. Breitentalskopf (579.1 m), Osterode am Harz district, Harz
9. Iberg (563 m), Osterode am Harz district, Harz
10. Franzosenkopf (562 m), Osterode am Harz district, Harz
11. Kloppstert (553 m), Osterode am Harz district, Harz
12. Eichelnkopf (545.7 m), Osterode am Harz district, Harz
13. Pagelsburg (545 m), Osterode am Harz district, Harz
14. Großer Steinberg (542 m), Göttingen district, Kaufungen Forest
15. Kleiner Steinberg (Kaufungen Forest) (542 m), Göttingen district, Kaufungen Forest
16. Großer Mittelberg (Lonau) (531 m), Osterode am Harz district, Harz
17. Große Blöße (527.8 m), Northeim district, Solling
18. Fissenkenkopf (527 m), Osterode am Harz district, Harz
19. Großer Ahrensberg (524.9 m), Holzminden district, Solling
20. Steile Wand (518.9 m), Osterode am Harz district, Harz
21. Moosberg (513.0 m), Holzminden district, Solling
22. Häringsnase (508 m), Göttingen district, Kaufungen Forest
23. Vogelherd (ca. 505 m), Holzminden district, Solling
24. Köterberg (496 m), Holzminden district, Weser Uplands
25. Dreiberg (495.5 m), Northeim district, Solling
26. Großer Steinberg (493 m), Northeim district, Solling
27. Großer Teichtalskopf (492 m), Osterode am Harz district, Harz
28. Tünnekenbornstrang (490.1 m), Northeim district, Solling
29. Großer Burgberg (482 m), Goslar district, Harz
30. Bloße Zelle (480 m), Duingen, Hildesheim district / Grünenplan, Holzminden district, Hils
31. Brunsberg (480 m), Göttingen district, Dransfeld State Forest (cf. Hoher Hagen)
32. Bärenkopf (473.0 m), Holzminden district, Solling
33. Heuer (472 m), Osterode am Harz district, Harz
34. Wolfsstrang (468.7 m), Northeim district, Solling
35. Hengelsberg (463 m), Göttingen district, Dransfeld State Forest
36. Brackenberg (461.0 m), Göttingen district, Münden Nature Park
37. Ebersnacken (460.4 m), Holzminden district, Vogler
38. Schönenberg (457.1 m), Northeim district, Solling
39. Hasselberg (also called Schrodhalbe; 452.5 m), Holzminden district, Solling
40. Hahnenbreite (452.0 m), Northeim district, Solling
41. Alte Schmacht (447.5 m), Northeim district, Solling
42. Eisernstieg (446.3 m), Northeim district, Solling
43. Holzberg (444.5 m), Holzminden district, Holzberg
44. Strutberg (444 m), Northeim district, Solling
45. Großer Lauenberg (442.6 m), Northeim district, Solling
46. Klippen (441.3 m), Holzminden district, Holzberg
47. Kanstein (441 m), Hameln-Pyrmont district, Thüster Berg
48. Wildenkiel (ca. 441 m), Holzminden district, Solling
49. Kohlhai (440.8 m), Holzminden district, Vogler
50. Auerhahnkopf (ca. 440 m), Holzminden district, Solling
51. Lauensteiner Kopf (439 m), Hameln-Pyrmont district, Ith
52. Hohe Egge (437 m), Hameln-Pyrmont district, Süntel
53. Schnippkopf (437.0 m), Holzminden district, Vogler
54. Kleiner Burgberg (436 m), Goslar district, Harz
55. Hammershüttenkopf (430.5 m; western peak), Holzminden district, Vogler
56. Mackenröder Spitze (427.5 m), Göttingen district, Göttingen Forest
57. Hengstrücken (424 m), Northeim district, Solling
58. Hünstollen (423.7 m), Göttingen district, Göttingen Forest
59. Dransberg (422 m), Göttingen district, Dransfeld State Forest
60. Buchholz (421.7 m), Holzminden district, Solling
61. Schotsberg (419 m), Göttingen district, Dransfeld State Forest
62. Fast (419 m), Hameln-Pyrmont district, Osterwald
63. Sonnenköpfe (414.6 m; western peak), Holzminden district, Solling
64. Hammershüttenkopf (412.5 m; eastern peak), Holzminden district, Vogler
65. Westlicher Voglerkamm (412 m), Holzminden district, Vogler
66. Sackberg (411.4 m), Northeim district, Ahlsburg
67. Helleberg (410 m), Holzminden district, Elfas
68. Totenberg (408 m), Göttingen district, Bramwald
69. Sonnenköpfe (407.0 m; Ostgipfel), Holzminden district, Solling
70. Ahrensberg (405 m), Holzminden district, Elfas
71. Netteberg (406.1 m), Goslar district, Harz
72. Bröhn (405.0 m), Hanover region, Deister
73. Großer Homburg (ca. 403 m), Holzminden district, Homburg Forest
74. Butterberg (402.0 m), Holzminden district, Vogler
75. Himbeerbrink (400.5 m), Holzminden district, Vogler
76. Till (399.2 m), Holzminden district, Homburg Forest
77. Kohlenberg (396.7 m), Holzminden district, Homburg Forest
78. Hohe Tafel (395 m), Hildesheim district, Sieben Berge
79. Höfeler (395.2 m), Hanover region, Deister
80. Belzer Berg (392.2 m), Northeim district, Amtsberge
81. Junge Schmacht (388.0 m), Northeim district, Solling
82. Kneppelberg (386 m), Holzminden district, Elfas
83. Reinekensiekskopf (382.1 m), Hanover region, Deister
84. Sandberg (382 m), Göttingen district, Bramwald
85. Klagesberg (381 m), Göttingen district, Bramwald
86. Vaaker Berg (380 m), Göttingen district, Bramwald
87. Platte (379.7 m), ??? district, Solling
88. Hohe Warte (378.5 m), Hanover region, Deister
89. Grasberg (378.2 m), Hameln-Pyrmont district / Hanover region, Nesselberg
90. Fahrenbrink (375.7 m), Hanover region, Deister
91. Belzer Berg (375.6 m), Northeim district, Amtsberge
92. Hoher Nacken (375 m), Hameln-Pyrmont district, Süntel
93. Mangel (374.9 m), Hanover region
94. Bakeder Berg (373 m), Hameln-Pyrmont district, Süntel
95. Klingenberg (373 m), Göttingen district, Bramwald
96. Schierenbrink (372.3 m), Hanover region / Hameln-Pyrmont district, Nesselberg
97. Ochsenberg (371.5 m), Northeim district, Ahlsburg
98. Ehrberg (370.5 m), Holzminden district, Vogler
99. Hatop (370.4 m), Northeim district, Amtsberge
100. Görtsberg (370 m), Holzminden district, Vogler
101. Stadtberg (369.2 m), Holzminden district, Homburg Forest
102. Diebische Ecke (367 m), Schaumburg district, Bückeberg
103. Birkenberg (366 m), Holzminden district, Elfas
104. Streitberg (366.0 m), Holzminden district, Vogler
105. Sommerberg (364.5 m), ??? district, Solling
106. Hörzen (364 m), Hildesheim district, Sieben Berge
107. Lehmbrink (364.0 m), Holzminden district, Vogler
108. Nesselberg (362 m), Hildesheim district, Sieben Berge
109. Großer Hals (361 m), Hanover region, Deister
110. Ostenberg (360 m), Hildesheim district, Sieben Berge
111. Ducksteinberg (360 m), Northeim district, Ahlsburg
112. Vorwohler Berg (360 m), Holzminden district, Elfas
113. Griesberg (359 m), Hildesheim district, Hildesheim Forest
114. Eichfast (355.7 m), Northeim district, Ahlsburg
115. Ebersberg (355.0 m), Hanover region, Deister
116. Bützeberg (352.6 m), Holzminden district, Vogler
117. Katzennase (352 m), Hameln-Pyrmont district, Süntel
118. Hoher Kamp (350 m), Hameln-Pyrmont district, Süntel
119. Teichklippe (up to 350 m), Northeim district, Amtsberge
120. Großer Schweineberg (349.8 m), Holzminden district, Vogler
121. Wolfsberg (347.3 m), Holzminden district, Homburg Forest
122. Wolfsköpfe (345.7 m), Hanover region, Kleiner Deister
123. Hübichenstein (345 m), Osterode am Harz district, Harz
124. Piepenberg (344.9 m), Holzminden district, Vogler
125. Bielstein (344 m), Hanover region, Deister
126. Wendeberg (343.6 m), Northeim district, Amtsberge
127. Kellberg (343.1 m; with observation tower), Holzminden district, Homburg Forest
128. Bückeberg (342 m), Schaumburg district, Bückeberg
129. Hohenstein (341 m), Hameln-Pyrmont district, Süntel
130. Bösenberg (339 m), Hildesheim district, Hildesheim Forest
131. Egge (339 m), ??? district, Deister
132. Lauensberg (333 m), Hildesheim district, Sieben Berge
133. Kleperberg (332 m), Göttingen district, Göttingen Forest
134. Flintenburg (331.5 m), Holzminden district, Vogler
135. Dörenberg (331.2 m), Osnabrück district, Teutoburg Forest
136. Egge (339 m), Hanover region, Deister
137. Südwehe (338 m), Hameln-Pyrmont district, Süntel
138. Babenstein (331), Hildesheim district, Duinger Berg
139. Breitenkamper Berg (326.9 m), Holzminden district, Vogler
140. Möncheberg (326 m), Schaumburg district, Wesergebirge
141. Roter Stein (325 m), Hameln-Pyrmont district, Süntel
142. Eilumer Horn (323.3 m), Wolfenbüttel district, Elm
143. Südlieth (323.2 m), Northeim district, Ahlsburg
144. Steinberg "1" (323 m), Hildesheim district, Hildesheim Forest
145. Drakenberg (321.0 m), Hanover region, Kleiner Deister
146. Heimkenberg (320.4 m), Northeim district, Amtsberge
147. Amelungsberg (320 m), Hameln-Pyrmont district, Süntel
148. Tosmarberg (320 m), Hildesheim district, Hildesheim Forest
149. Heidelberg (319.3 m), Holzminden district, Homburg Forest
150. Kikedal (319 m), Hildesheim district, Duinger Berg
151. Hohe Dehne (317.6 m), Hildesheim district, Heber
152. Hammersteinshöhe (317 m), Hildesheim district, Sauberge
153. Hainberg (Göttingen Forest) (315 m), Göttingen district, Göttingen Forest
154. Kniebrink (315 m), ??? district, Wiehengebirge
155. Hirtenberg (314.1 m), Holzminden district, Vogler
156. Grafensundern (314 m), Osnabrück district, Teutoburg Forest
157. Mechtshäuser Berg (313.5 m), Goslar district, Heber
158. Drachenberg (313 m), Wolfenbüttel district, Elm
159. Saalberg (313 m), Hildesheim district, Sieben Berge
160. Klei (312.9 m), Northeim district, Heber
161. Burgberg (312 m), Wolfenbüttel district, Elm
162. Kniggenbrink (312 m), Hanover region, Deister
163. Lohberg (312 m), Göttingen district, Dransfeld State Forest
164. Rosenberg (311 m), Hildesheim district, Hildesheim Forest
165. Schiffberg (311.0 m), Holzminden district, Homburg Forest
166. Wisselberg (310 m), Holzminden district, Vogler
167. Kalenberg (310 m), Hanover region, Deister
168. Zimmerberg (309.0 m), Holzminden district, Vogler
169. Weidenberg (308.7 m), Northeim district, Ahlsburg
170. Butterberg (308 m), Goslar district, Harz
171. Himmelberg (308 m), Hildesheim district, Sieben Berge
172. Bärenkopf (307 m), Goslar district, Salzgitter Hills
173. Hankenüll (307 m), Osnabrück district, on the border of Lower Saxony and North Rhine-Westphalia, Teutoburg Forest
174. Hammberg (306 m), Hildesheim district, Hildesheim Forest
175. Ramsnacken (305 m), Hameln-Pyrmont district, Süntel
176. Iberg (303.0 m), Northeim district, Ahlsburg
177. Querberg (303 m), Hildesheim district, Hildesheim Forest
178. Weinberg (302.4 m; near Holenberg), Holzminden district, Vogler
179. Großer Karl (301 m), Schaumburg district, Bückeberg
180. Nußberg (301 m), Hildesheim district, Sieben Berge
181. Borberg (300 m), Hameln-Pyrmont district, Süntel
182. Schrabstein (300 m), Hameln-Pyrmont district, Süntel
183. Kalter Buschkopf (299 m), Wolfenbüttel district, Hainberg
184. Kurzeberg (299 m), Holzminden district, Elfas
185. Riesenberg (298 m), Hameln-Pyrmont district, Süntel
186. Klagesberg (298.2 m), Northeim district, Ahlsburg
187. ???-Berg (298.0 m; with Grubenhagen Castle), Northeim district, Ahlsburg
188. Böllenberg (297 m), Northeim district, Ahlsburg
189. Iberg (295 m), Hameln-Pyrmont district, Süntel
190. Mittelberg (294 m), Hameln-Pyrmont district, Süntel
191. Turmberg (293 m), Hildesheim district, Bünte
192. Vorberg (289 m), Northeim district, Ahlsburg
193. Werderberg (288.1 m), Holzminden district, Vogler
194. Langer Kopf (288 m), Hildesheim district, Hildesheim Forest
195. Hasselnberg (286 m), Hameln-Pyrmont district, Süntel
196. Raher Berg (285.1 m), Hanover region, Kleiner Deister
197. Schlahköpfe (285 m), Wolfenbüttel district, Hainberg
198. Steinberg (max. 283 m), Wolfenbüttel district, Hainberg
199. Welfenhöhe (282 m), Hildesheim district, Hildesheim Forest
200. Himckeburg (280.2 m), Holzminden district, Vogler
201. Pferdeberg (279 m), Göttingen district, Untereichsfeld
202. Eimer Berg (278 m), Holzminden district, Elfas
203. Schweineberg (278 m), Hameln-Pyrmont district, Wesergebirge
204. Süllberg (277 m), Hildesheim district, Hildesheim Forest
205. Sonnenberg (276 m), Hildesheim district, Hildesheim Forest
206. Hamberg (275 m), Stadt Salzgitter, (Salzgitter Hills)
207. Wohlberg (273 m), Hildesheim district, Hildesheim Forest
208. Rothenberg (270 m), Northeim district, Amtsberge
209. Großer Freeden (269 m), Osnabrück district, Teutoburg Forest
210. Heisennacken (267 m), Holzminden district, Elfas
211. Schierenberg (267 m), Hildesheim district, Hildesheim Forest
212. Auf dem Herze (266 m), Hildesheim district, Hildesheim Forest
213. Ebersberg (266 m), Hildesheim district, Sauberge
214. Feldberg (266 m), Hildesheim district, Bünte
215. Eichenberg (263 m), Hildesheim district, Hildesheim Forest
216. Hohlenberg (263 m), Wolfenbüttel district, Hainberg
217. Triesberg (261 m), Hildesheim district, Hildesheim Forest
218. Osterberg (260 m), Hameln-Pyrmont district, Süntel
219. Rottberg (259 m), Hildesheim district, Hildesheim Forest
220. Wedeberg (258 m), ??? district, Teutoburg Forest
221. Salzberg (257 m), Hildesheim district, Sauberge
222. Ziegenberg (257 m), Hildesheim district, Sauberge
223. Harlyberg (256 m), Goslar district, Harly Forest
224. Buchberg (255 m), Hildesheim district, Weinberg
225. Königszinne (255.0 m), Holzminden district, Vogler
226. Adlershorst (254 m), town of Salzgitter, Lichtenberge (Salzgitter Hills)
227. Hülsberg (254 m), ??? district, Teutoburg Forest
228. Kliebenkopf (254 m), Wolfenbüttel district, Hainberg
229. Timmer Egge (254 m), ??? district, Teutoburg Forest
230. Laubberg (253 m), Goslar district, Hainberg
231. Dröhnenberg (252 m), Hildesheim district, Hildesheim Forest
232. Jägerturmsköpfe (max. 251 m), Wolfenbüttel district, Hainberg
233. Hinterberg (249 m), Hildesheim district, Hildesheim Forest
234. Westerberg (249 m), Hameln-Pyrmont district, Süntel
235. Haiberg (248 m), Hildesheim district, Hildesheim Forest
236. Brandberg (247 m), Hildesheim district, Hildesheim Forest
237. Westeregge (245 m), Schaumburg district, Süntel
238. Klusberg (244 m), Hildesheim district, Hildesheim Forest
239. Nördlicher Jägertumskopf (244 m), Wolfenbüttel district, Hainberg
240. Spannbrink (244 m), ??? district, Teutoburg Forest
241. Weißer Stein (244 m), Hildesheim district, Sauberge
242. Heeßer Berg (243 m), Schaumburg district, Bückeberg
243. Hohes Rad (243 m), Hameln-Pyrmont district, Süntel
244. Knebelberg (243 m), Hildesheim district, Vorholz
245. Lerchenberg (243 m), Hildesheim district, Hildesheim Forest
246. Sieben Köpfe (243 m), town of Salzgitter, Lichtenberge (Salzgitter Hills)
247. Hamberg (242 m), Hildesheim district, Hildesheim Forest
248. Steinberg "2" (242 m), Hildesheim district, Hildesheim Forest
249. Hohnsberg (241.9 m) Osnabrück district, Teutoburg Forest
250. Burgberg (241 m), town of Salzgitter, Lichtenberge (Salzgitter Hills)
251. Linkkopf (241 m), Hildesheim district, Hildesheim Forest
252. Katenstein (240.7 m), Northeim district, Ahlsburg
253. Steinberg (239 m), Schaumburg district, Bückeberg
254. Herzberg (237 m), town of Salzgitter, Lichtenberge (Salzgitter Hills)
255. Kneppelberg (236 m), Hildesheim district, Hildesheim Forest
256. Sothenberg (235 m), Hildesheim district, Sauberge
257. Osterklippe (235 m), Goslar district, Hainberg
258. Remlinger Herse (234 m), Wolfenbüttel district, Asse
259. Kappenberg (233 m), Holzminden district, Vogler
260. Langer Berg (230 m), town of Salzgitter, Lichtenberge (Salzgitter Hills)
261. Eichenberg (230 m), Hildesheim district, Hainberg
262. Barenberg (227 m), Hildesheim district, Vorholz
263. Stuckenberg (227 m), Hildesheim district, Hildesheim Forest
264. Hüggel (226 m), Osnabrück district, Teutoburg Forest
265. Papenberg (226 m), Hildesheim district, Hainberg
266. Röhrberg (225 m), Wolfenbüttel district, Asse
267. Borgberg (225 m), ??? district, Teutoburg Forest
268. Elber Berg (225 m), Wolfenbüttel district, Lichtenberge (Salzgitter Hills)
269. Kahlberg (224.7 m), Northeim district, Solling
270. Hillenberg (224 m), Hildesheim district, Hainberg
271. Langenberg (224 m), Hildesheim district, Hainberg
272. Festberg (223 m), Wolfenbüttel district, Asse
273. Hinterer Eichberg (222 m), Wolfenbüttel district, Asse
274. Spitzer Hai (222 m), Wolfenbüttel district, Hainberg
275. Wendgeberg (222 m), Hameln-Pyrmont district, Süntel
276. Rothenberg (221 m), Wolfenbüttel district, Asse
277. Heidelbeerenberg (221 m), Hildesheim district, Vorholz
278. Weinberg (220.5 m; near Rühle), Holzminden district, Vogler
279. Beutling (220 m), Osnabrück district, Teutoburg Forest
280. Kalkrosenberg (220 m), town of Salzgitter, Lichtenberge (Salzgitter Hills)
281. Lindenberg (219 m), town of Salzgitter, Lichtenberge (Salzgitter Hills)
282. Wohldenberg (218 m), ??? district, Hainberg
283. Ziegenberg (218 m), Hildesheim district, Hildesheim Forest
284. Langer Berg (216 m), Hildesheim district, Vorholz
285. Oheberg (215 m), Hildesheim district, Sauberge
286. Großer Steinberg (213 m), Hildesheim district, Vorholz
287. Urberg (213 m), Osnabrück district, Bad Iburg, Teutoburg Forest
288. Mühlberg (212 m), Göttingen district, Bramwald
289. Kapitelhai (209 m), Wolfenbüttel district, Hainberg
290. Wenser Berg (209 m), Hildesheim district, Vorholz
291. Kleiner Berg (208 m), Osnabrück district, Teutoburg Forest
292. Kanzelberg (207 m), Hildesheim district, Bünte
293. Klingenberg (207 m), Hildesheim district, Hildesheim Forest
294. Spitzhut (207 m), Hildesheim district, Vorholz
295. Langenberg (206 m), Osnabrück district, Teutoburg Forest
296. Hützlah (206 m), ??? district, Hainberg
297. Hungerberg (205 m), Wolfenbüttel district, Oderwald
298. Mittlerer Eichberg (201 m), Wolfenbüttel district, Asse
299. Emilienhöhe (201 m), Hildesheim district, Hildesheim Forest
300. Großer Steinkuhlenberg (201 m), town of Salzgitter, Lichtenberge (Salzgitter Hills)
301. Ilsenberg (201 m), Hildesheim district, Vorholz
302. Mieckenberg (200 m), Hildesheim district, Vorholz
303. Kleiner Freeden (200 m), Osnabrück district, Teutoburg Forest
304. Süllberg (198.2 m), Hanover region, Calenberg Land
305. Strutzberg (198 m), Schaumburg district, Deister
306. Kleiner Steinkuhlenberg (195 m), town of Salzgitter, Lichtenberge (Salzgitter Hills)
307. Limberg (194.3 m), Osnabrück district, Teutoburg Forest
308. Born (192 m), Osnabrück district, Wiehen Hills
309. Bockernberg (190 m), town of Salzgitter, Lichtenberge (Salzgitter Hills)
310. Silberberg (180 m), Osnabrück district, Hüggel region
311. Kleiner Steinberg (175 m), Hildesheim district, Vorholz
312. Thieberg (175 m), Hildesheim district, Vorholz
313. Benther Berg (173 m), Hanover region, Calenberg Land
314. Schulenburger Berg (173 m), Hanover region
315. Großer Hahnenberg (172 m), Wolfenbüttel district, Asse
316. Wilseder Berg (169 m), Soltau-Fallingbostel district, Lüneburg Heath
317. Rehberg (165 m), Hildesheim district, Vorholz
318. Brunnenberg (161 m), Nienburg/Weser district, Rehburg Hills
319. Münchhausener Berg (160 m), Schaumburg district, Bückeberg
320. Kalkrieser Berg (157 m), Osnabrück district, Wiehen Hills
321. Ortsberg (157 m), Hildesheim district, Vorholz
322. Öselberg (156 m), Wolfenbüttel district, Ösel
323. Burgberg (155 m), Hanover region, Gehrdener Berg
324. Hülsenberg (155 m), Harburg district, Harburg Hills
325. Heisterberg (153 m), Schaumburg district, Bückeberg
326. Wolfsberg (152.1 m), Hanover region, Calenberg Land
327. Falkenberg (150 m), Celle district, Lüneburg Heath
328. Gannaberg (150 m), Harburg district, Harburg Hills
329. Schleptruper Egge (148 m), Bramsche district, Wiehen Hills
330. Vörier Berg (147.6 m), Hanover region, Calenberg Land
331. Signalberg (146 m), Vechta district, Damme Hills
332. Mordkuhlenberg (145 m), Vechta district, Damme Hills
333. Süerser Berg (143 m), Hanover region, Gehrdener Berg
334. Hoher Mechtin (142 m), Lüchow-Dannenberg district, Elbufer-Drawehn Nature Park, Drawehn
335. Lauseberg (141.0 m), Hanover region, Deister
336. Pampower Berg (140 m), Lüchow-Dannenberg district, Elbufer-Drawehn Nature Park
337. Trillenberg (140 m), Osnabrück district, Ankum Heights
338. Hagenberg (136.2 m), Osnabrück district, Teutoburg Forest
339. Köthenerberg (139 m), Hanover region, Gehrdener Berg
340. Brunsberg (129 m), Harburg district, Harburg Hills
341. Kiekeberg (127 m), Harburg district, Harburg Hills (The Black Hills)
342. Blauer Berg (125 m), Uelzen district, Samtgemeinde Suderburg, Lüneburg Heath
343. Stemmer Berg (122.8 m), Hanover region
344. Müllberg (called Monte Müllo, 121.3 m), city of Hanover
345. Lindenberg (121 m), town of Salzgitter
346. Spröckelnberg (121 m), Vechta district, Damme Hills
347. Loccumer Berg (119 m), Nienburg (Weser) district, Rehburg Hills
348. Bökenberg (114 m), Vechta district, Damme Hills
349. Geitelder Berg (111 m), city of Brunswick
350. Roter Berg (108 m), Osnabrück district, Hüggel
351. Fistelberge (107 m), Harburg district, Harburg Hills (The Black Hills (Die Schwarzen Berge))
352. Flidderberg (107 m), Harburg district, Harburg Hills, Lohberge
353. Kronsberg (106 m), Hanover region
354. Wietzer Berg (102 m), Celle district, Südheide
355. Otterberg (101 m), Harburg district, southwest of the Harburg Hills
356. Nußberg (93 m), city of Brunswick
357. Bentheimer Schlossberg (92 m), Grafschaft Bentheim district, outlier of the Teutoburg Forest
358. Windmühlenberg (91 m), Emsland district, Lingen Heights
359. Poascheberg (89 m), Grafschaft Bentheim district, Niedergrafschaft, near Neuenhaus
360. Lindener Berg (87 m), Hanover region
361. Giersberg, (83 m), city of Brunswick
362. Harzhorn (82 m), Peine district, hill on the eastern perimeter of Duttenstedt
363. Silberberg (74 m), Cuxhaven district, Wingst
364. Windberg (73 m), Emsland district, Hümmling
365. Isterberg (68 m), Grafschaft Bentheim district, south of Nordhorn
366. Litberg (65 m), Stade district, Stade Geest
367. Seilbahnberg (62.7), Peine district, artificial hill on the eastern edge of Lengede
368. Deutscher Olymp (61 m), Cuxhaven district, Wingst
369. Weyerberg (51 m), Osterholz district, Worpswede
370. Gierenberg (23 m), Oldenburg district, Osenberge
371. Kistenberg (23 m), Oldenburg district, Osenberge

== See also ==
- List of mountains in the Harz
- List of the highest mountains in Germany
- List of the highest mountains in the German states
- List of mountain and hill ranges in Germany
