= Sonnenberg (Harz) =

Ski resort in Germany

Großer Sonnenberg
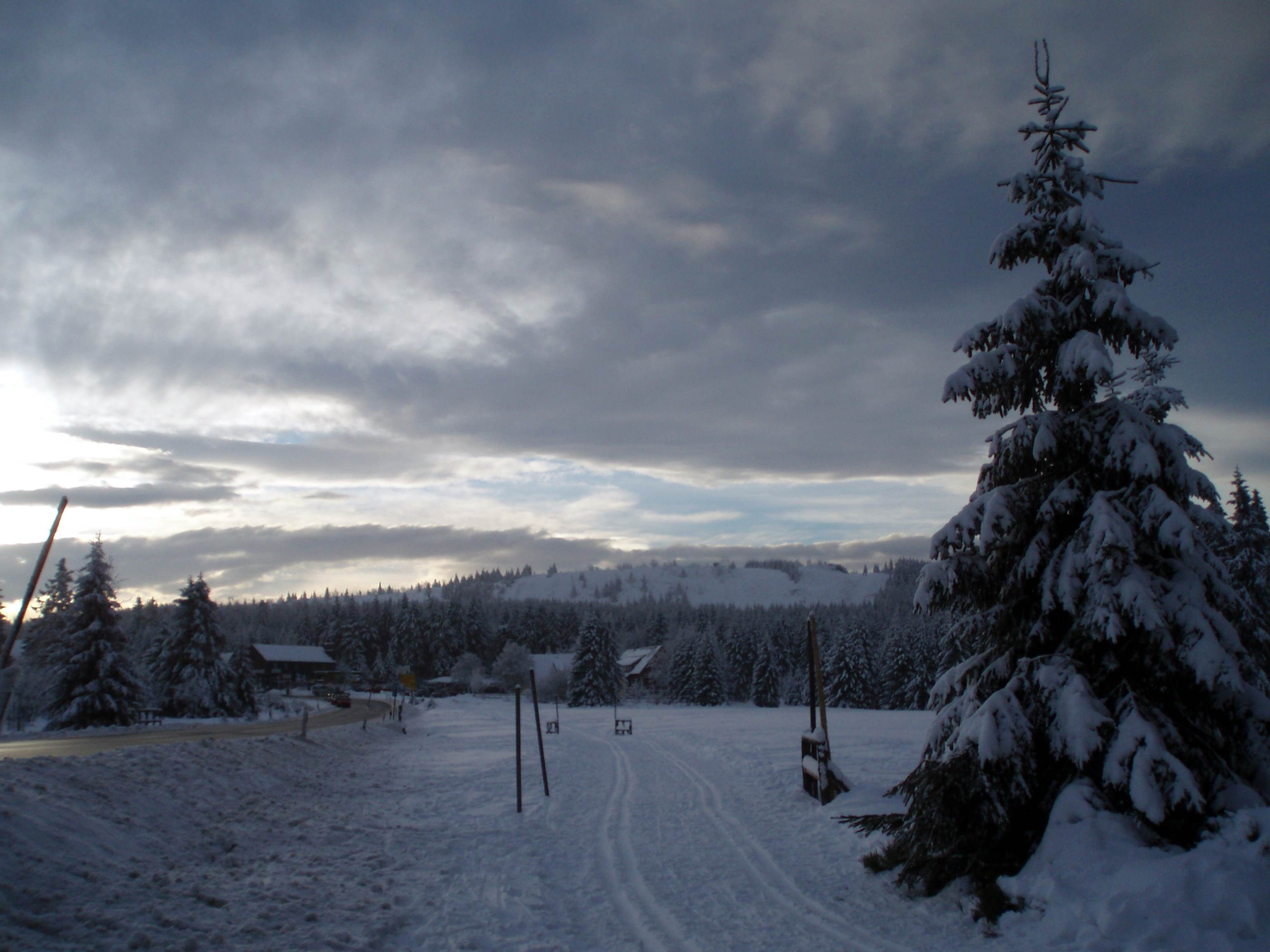
- Langlauf trail on the Sonnenberg

Highest point
- Elevation: 853.4 m above sea level (NN) (2,800 ft)
- Prominence: 23 m ↓ 830 m between Kl. and Gr. Sonnenberg → Rehberg
- Isolation: 1.95 km → Rehberg
- Coordinates: 51°45′20″N 10°30′47″E

Geography
- Location within Lower Saxony
- Location: Lower Saxony, Germany
- Parent range: Harz Mountains

The Sonnenberg (German pronunciation: [ˈzɔnənbɛʁk]) is a ski resort in the Upper Harz surrounded by the Harz National Park. The settlement of the same name located there is part of the borough of Sankt Andreasberg.

== Topography ==
Kleiner Sonnenberg
- Location within Lower Saxony

Highest point
- Elevation: 853 m above sea level (NN) (2,798.6 ft)
- Prominence: 20 m → Rehberg
- Isolation: 0.9 km → Rehberg
- Coordinates: 51°44′59″N 10°31′53″E

About a kilometre southeast of the Großer Sonnenberg is the Kleiner Sonnenberg which is only 40 cm lower. The L 519 state road runs over the 830 m high saddle between the two mountains and between the village of Sonnenberg and the main town of Sankt Andreasberg. Following the line of the crest further to the southeast for a further kilometre and beyond another saddle, 833 m high, one reaches the 892 m high Rehberg.

On the eastern slope of the Großer Sonnenberg is a triangulation station at a height of 838 m; this is the height shown on most topographical maps and is frequently misinterpreted as the actual height of the Großer Sonnenberg.

== Winter sports ==
There are three T-bars and a rope tow on the Sonnenberg for Alpine sports.

- Total piste length: 2,600 m
- Height difference: ca. 200 m
- Difficulty: 1,400 m easy; 1,200 m medium

For cross-country skiers the Sonnenberg Langlauf Network (Loipennetz Sonnenberg) offers a direct link to the trails around Sankt Andreasberg. In addition there is a connexion to the Ackerloipe and a link trail to Oderbrück, that runs past Oderteich. For tobogganists there is a separate toboggan piste. Medical support is provided by a first aid station operated by the Sankt Andreasberg Mountain Rescue organisation (Bergwacht Sankt Andreasberg) on the large car park, that is open during winter weekends. Due to its height the Sonnenberg has guaranteed snow until spring.

On the Sonnenberg there is also the state biathlon centre, in which national and international competitions are staged. In 2009, a snowmaking facility was built.

== See also ==
- List of mountains and hills in Lower Saxony
- List of mountains in the Harz
