= Achtermannshöhe =

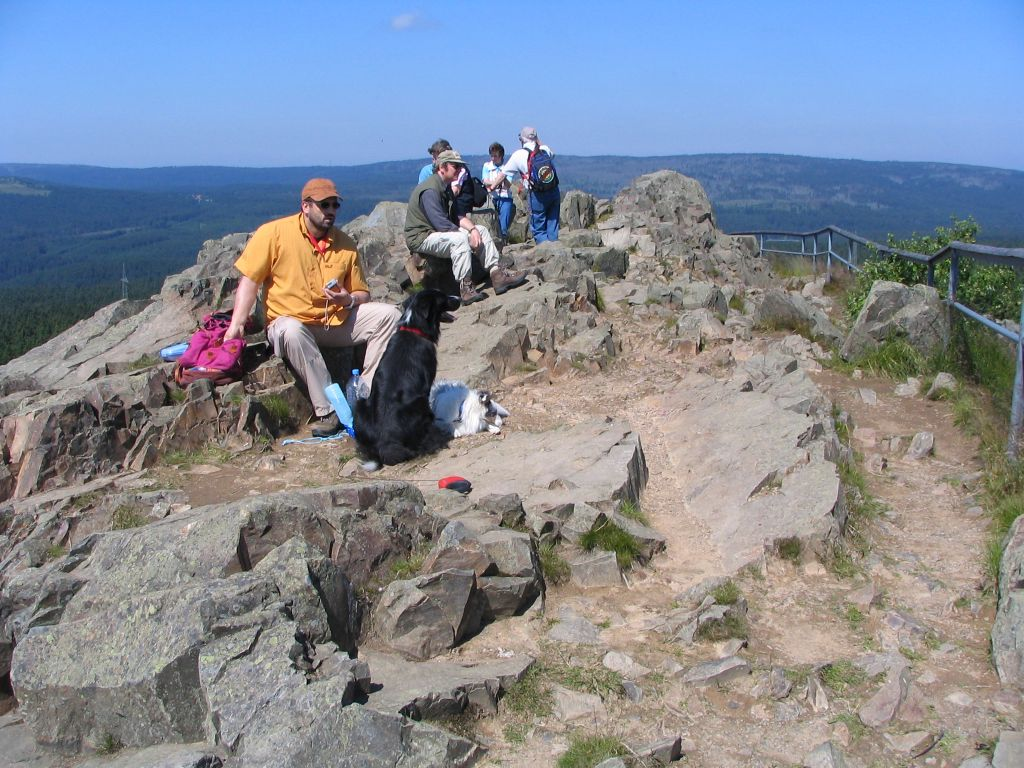
- Summit of the Achtermannshöhe

Highest point
- Elevation: 925 m (3,035 ft)
- Prominence: 104 m (341 ft)
- Parent peak: Brocken
- Coordinates: 51°45′39″N 10°34′10″E

Geography
- Location within Lower Saxony
- Location: Lower Saxony, Germany
- Parent range: Harz

Geology
- Mountain type(s): Granite, hornfels

At 925 m above sea level (NN), the Achtermannshöhe (also just called the Achtermann) in the Harz National Park is the third highest mountain in Lower Saxony and the fourth highest in the Harz mountains.

It lies in the unincorporated area of Harz between the Harz-Heide route (B 4) and the old Inner German Border about 6 km north of Braunlage. Its summit, covered with loose boulders, stands proud of the surrounding trees and offers a superb all-round view. Equally its characteristic rounded hilltop or Kuppe is visible in good weather from many other points in the Harz.

The Achtermann may be accessed by paths leading from Oderbrück and Königskrug.

== Geology ==
The base of the Achtermannshöhe is part of the granite massif of the Brocken, which extends across a wide area between Wurmberg, Torfhaus and Elend. By contrast, the rocky, treeless Kuppe of the Achtermann comprises hornfels, a contact metamorphic rock. The hornstone on the summit has a depth of about 10 m and was formed from Grauwacke as it was heated during the intrusion of granitic magma.

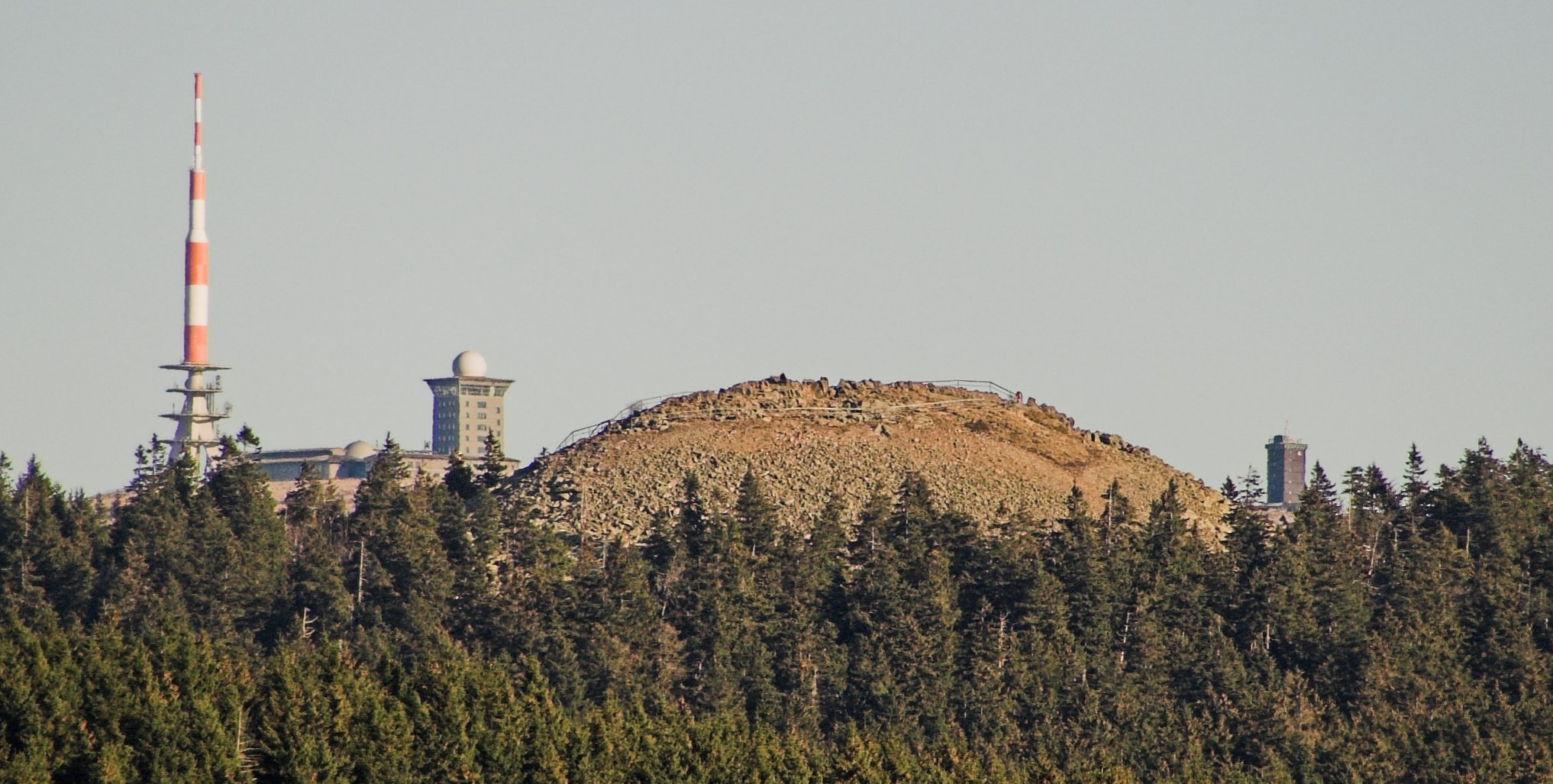
Achtermannkuppe from the Rehberg. In the background are buildings on the Brocken Plateau.

== History ==
Earlier names include Uchteneshoge and Uchtenhoch.

== Hiking ==
The Achtermannshöhe is checkpoint no. 12 in the network of ‘stamp’ checkpoints on the Harz Wandernadel route.

== See also ==
- List of mountains and hills of Lower Saxony
- List of mountains of the Harz
