= Bröhn =

Highest hill in the Deister range in the German state of Lower Saxony

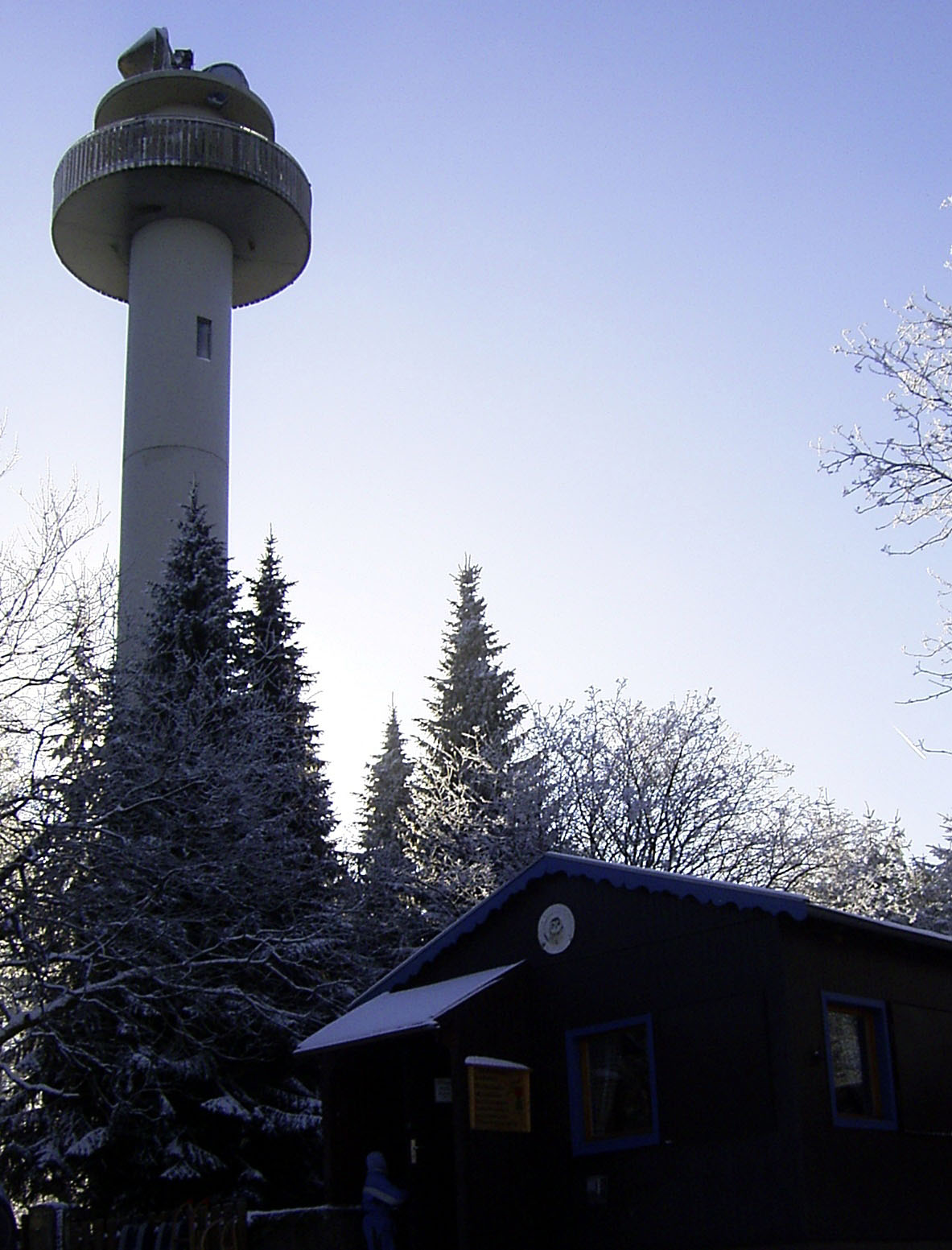
- The Anna Tower (Annaturm), woodland inn of the same name shown in foreground

Highest point
- Elevation: 405 m above sea level (NN) (1,328.7 ft)
- Prominence: 264 m (866 ft) → Hohe Egge
- Isolation: 10.8 km (6.7 mi) → Hohe Egge
- Coordinates: 52.247291°N 9.508591°E

Geography
- Location within Lower Saxony
- Location: Lower Saxony, Germany
- Parent range: Deister

The Bröhn is the highest hill in the Deister range in the German state of Lower Saxony, reaching 405 metres (1,329 ft). It owes its name to the broom (Besenginster, but formerly known as Bröm or Bram) growing here. The highest point of the hill is close to the Anna Tower, an observation tower on the territory of the town of Springe close to the boundary of the municipality of Wennigsen.

== Height ==
At 405.0 metres (1,328.7 ft) above Normalnull (a former German sea level definition), the Bröhn is the highest hill in the Deister, and the highest hill on the extreme northern rim of the German Central Uplands.

== Observation tower ==
On the summit of the Bröhn stands the Anna Tower (Annaturm), a 28-metre-high (92 ft) microwave tower made of reinforced concrete, the fifth successor to the original survey tower that was built on this spot at the instigation of Carl Friedrich Gauss in 1834. in fair weather, the view over the Calenberg Land reaches as far as Hildesheim and Hanover, to Lake Steinhude, and also over the northern Weser Uplands.

Next to the Anna Tower is a woodland inn of the same name. The Anna Tower is about 3 kilometres (1.9 mi) from the car park on the Nienstedt Pass. It is also about 3 kilometres (1.9 mi) from Springe (via the car park towards Köllnischfeld). The Anna Tower is open between 10 am and 5 pm every day except Mondays.

Not far from the Bröhn, on the Höfeler (395 metres or 1,296 feet), is a tower belonging to Deutsche Flugsicherung, Germany's air traffic control company, with a SRE-M radar site. Each of the six SRE-M sites across the country has a range of about 269 kilometres (167 mi). In the vicinity on the crest of the Deister are other flight safety installations.

In the 1950s there was an air traffic control centre of the Luftfahrt-Bundesamt ('Federal Aviation Agency'). At 11 am on a September day in 1958 an F-84 Thunderjet fighter of the Danish Air Force crashed about 300 metres (980 ft) east of the control centre. The aeroplane grazed several treetops over a distance of some 500 metres (1,600 ft) before exploding. The 24-year-old pilot, Jörgensen, died in the crash. He had taken off with his squadron from Copenhagen and his destination was the Upjever air base near Schortens. In fog, he lost his bearings and sent his last position report at a height of 250 metres (820 ft) over Stadthagen.

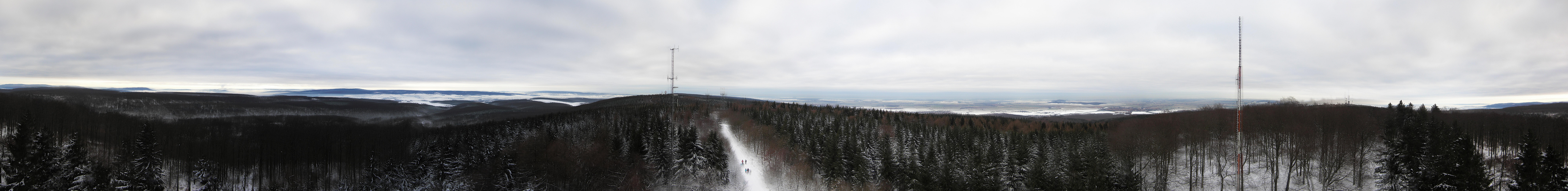
Panoramic view from the Anna Tower
