= Eichelnkopf =

Hill in the Harz Mountains, Lower Saxony

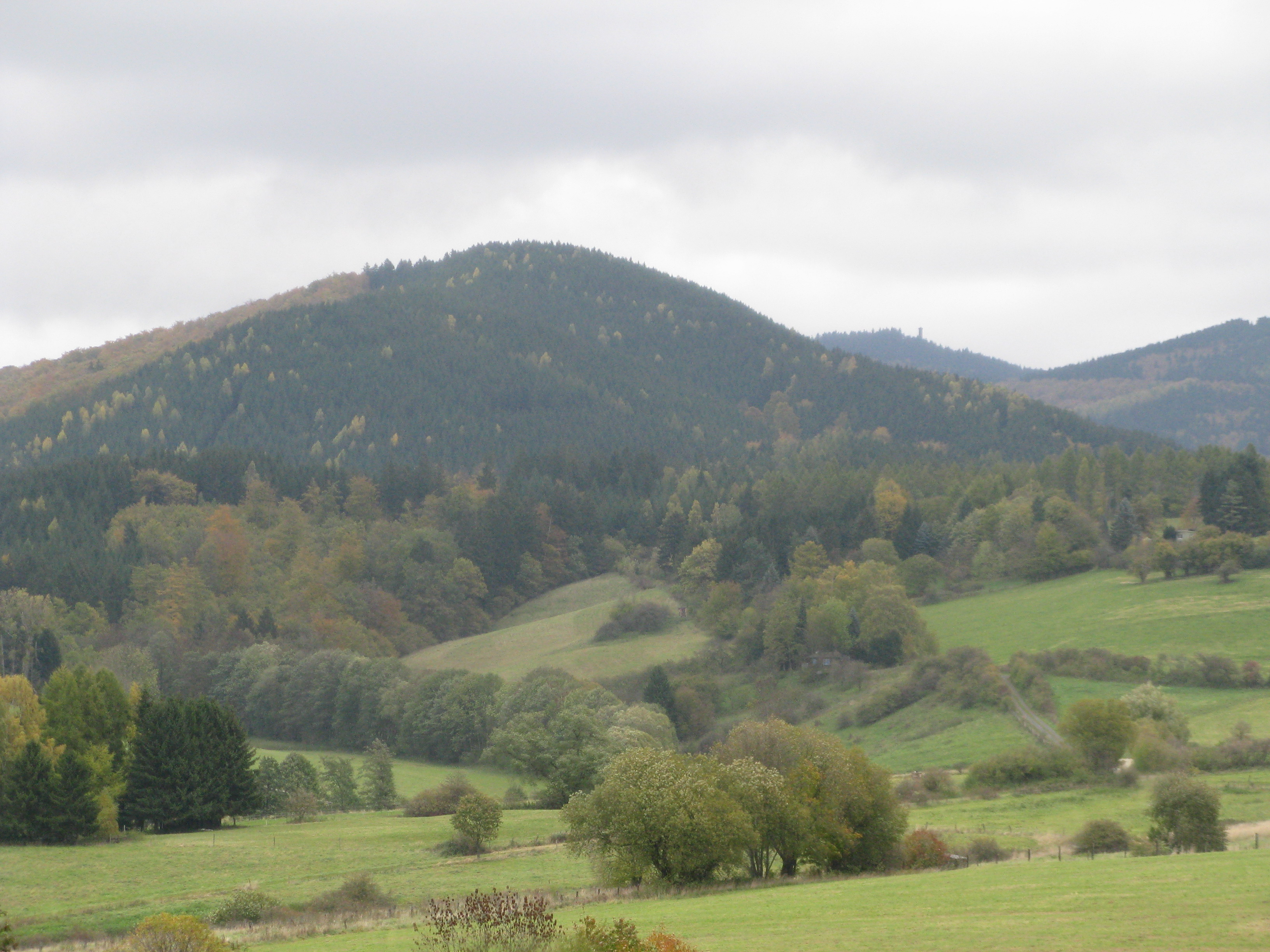
- The Eichelnkopf near Herzberg am Harz. Rear right: the Großer Knollen with its observation tower

Highest point
- Elevation: 545.7 m above sea level (NN) (1,790 ft)
- Prominence: 63 m ↓ Crest northeast of the Eichelnkopf → Höxterberg
- Isolation: 1.12 km → Grimmberg
- Coordinates: 51°39′36″N 10°23′41″E

Geography
- Location within Lower Saxony
- Location: Lower Saxony, Germany
- Parent range: Harz Mountains

The Eichelnkopf is a 545.7 m (1,790 ft) high hill in the southwestern part of the Harz Mountains in the central German state of Lower Saxony.

== Geography ==
The Eichelnkopf lies about 3.5 km (2.2 mi) east of Herzberg am Harz, about 3.5 km (2.2 mi) north of Scharzfeld and about 2.5 km (1.6 mi) southwest of the Großer Knollen. Its nearest neighbour is the Mittelecke. The hill is completely forested.

== Walking ==
There is a trail that runs from the north and over the summit. The last 300 m (980 ft) below the summit, with an incline of up to 34%, is especially challenging for mountain bikers. On the south slope of the Eichelnkopf, a trail runs past the 300-year-old "Owl Oak" (Euleneiche).

== Geology ==
On the eastern slopes is an isolated outcrop of dark argillaceous slate (Tonschiefer) from the Silurian period, which is one of the oldest rocks in the entire Harz.

== Sources ==
- Topographische Karte 1:25000 Nr. 4328 Bad Lauterberg im Harz
- Geologische Karte Harz 1:100000, Herausgegeben vom Landesamt für Geologie und Bergwesen Sachsen-Anhalt in Zusammenarbeit mit dem Niedersächsischen Landesamt für Bodenforschung, Halle 1998, ISBN 3-929951-20-7
