= Gehrdener Berg =

Mountain

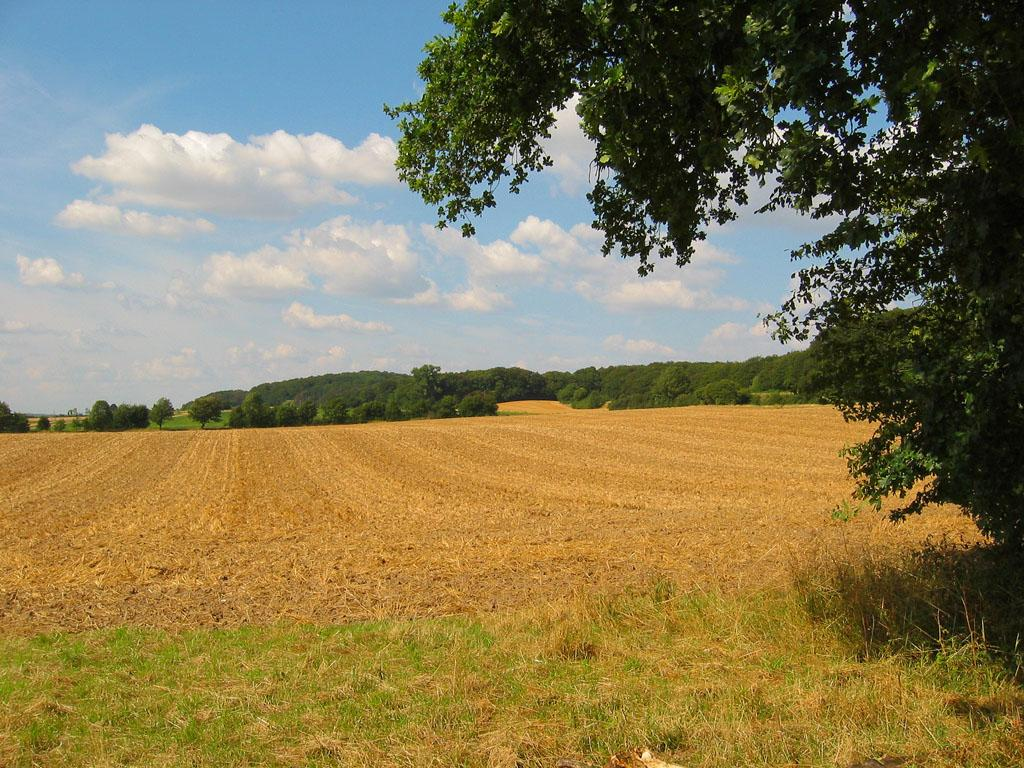
- The Gehrdener Berg in late summer

Highest point
- Elevation: 155 m above sea level (NN) (509 ft)
- Prominence: 70 m → Deister
- Isolation: 3.1 km → Benther Berg
- Coordinates: 52°18′29″N 9°35′24″E

Geography
- Location within Lower Saxony
- Location: Lower Saxony, Germany

The Gehrdener Berg is a forested ridge in the Calenberg Land in Hanover Region in the north German state of Lower Saxony. On its slopes nestles the town of Gehrden that gives the ridge its name. The ridge is about 2.7 kilometres long and is the sister hill range of the Benther Berg in southwest Hanover. Its highest point is the Burgberg at 155 metres above sea level (NN).

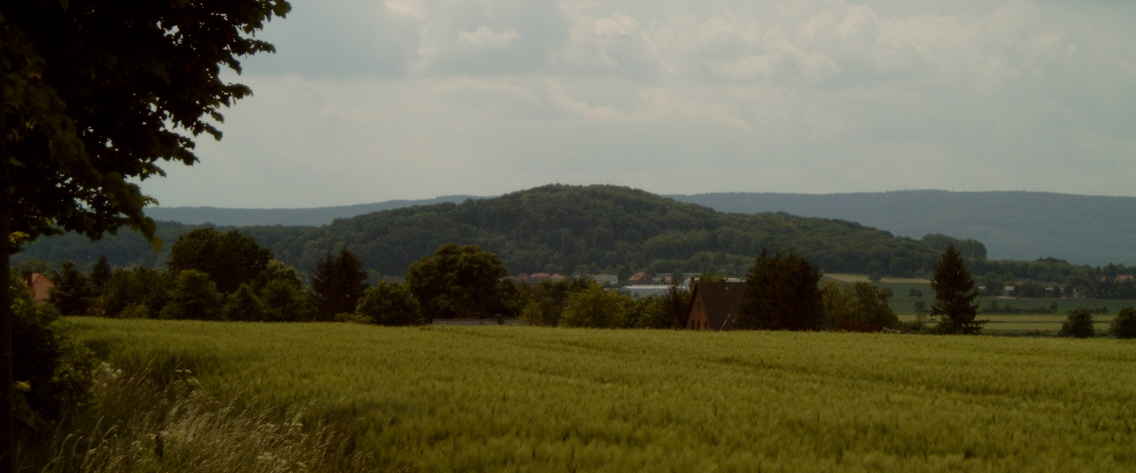
The Gehrdener Berg with the Deister in the background

== Sources ==
- Werner Fütterer: Gehrden – Vom Flecken zur Großgemeinde. Gehrden 1991
- August Kageler: Geschichte der Stadt Gehrden. Gehrden 1950
