= Hatten =

- Municipality
- Coat of arms

- Location of Hatten within Oldenburg district
- Interactive map of Hatten
- Location within Germany Location within Lower Saxony
- Coordinates: 53°00′30″N 08°19′00″E
- Country: Germany
- State: Lower Saxony
- District: Oldenburg
- Subdivisions: 17 districts

Government
  - Mayor (2021–26): Guido Heinisch

Area
  - Total: 103.44 km^{2} (39.94 sq mi)
- Elevation: 34 m (112 ft)

Population (2025-12-31)
  - Total: 14,198
  - Density: 137.26/km^{2} (355.50/sq mi)
- Time zone: UTC+01:00 (CET)
  - Summer (DST): UTC+02:00 (CEST)
- Postal codes: 26209
- Dialling codes: 0 44 81, 0 44 82 (Hatten/Kirchhatten)
- Vehicle registration: OL
- Website: www.hatten.de

Hatten is a municipality in Oldenburg, in Lower Saxony, Germany. It is situated 16 km (9.94 mi) southeast of Oldenburg, on the North-West edge of the Wildeshausen Geest Nature Park.

== Activities ==
Tourism endeavours emphasise the recreational and sporting opportunities available in the area. This includes, adjoining Kirchhatten, a large recreational centre, with swimming pool, exhibition and other facilities. Many visitors enjoy canoeing on the region's major river, the Hunte. The Hatten Airfield, Flugplatz Oldenburg-Hatten, is suitable for small aircraft. It also comprises a flight training school, and sightseeing flights can be booked there as well.

The region is serviced through an extensive public transport system, connecting with regional centres, with regular bus and train (NordWestBahn) schedules. These provide access to prominent tourist attractions, which in Sandkrug includes Blacksmith and Printing Museums. Moreover, Sandhatten features the workshop of well-known European artist Martin McWilliam, as well as ca. 6000-year-old stone graves.

== Hatter Sprudel (Spring Water) ==
The name given to water attained from around the Osenberge, know to be one of the purest sources of spring water in all of Germany. It is entirely free of substantial bacteriological impurities, thus requiring the addition of no chlorine. Water from this source is sufficient to supply the needs of approximately 60 per cent of the greater Oldenburg area.

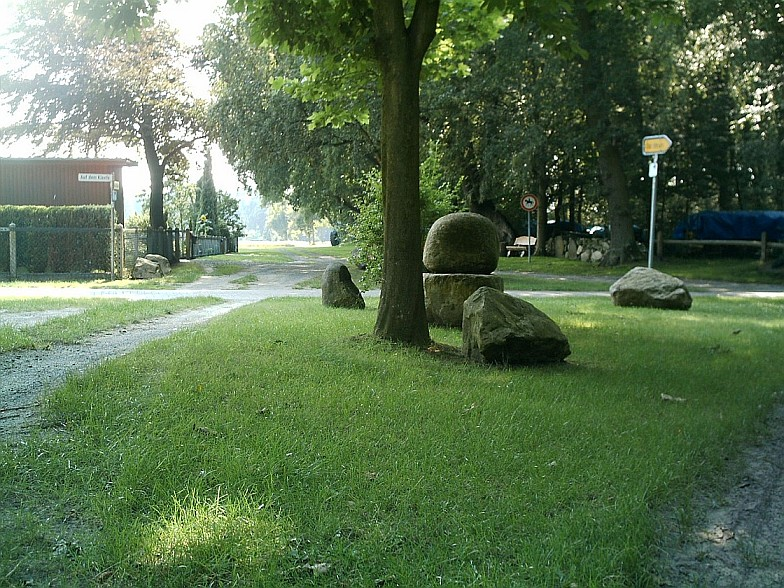
Stone Placement in Hatten

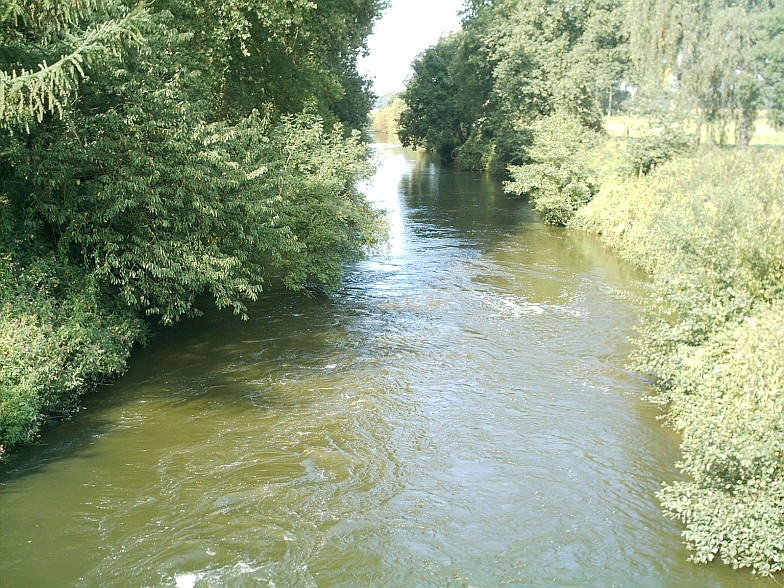
Die Hunte in Hatten

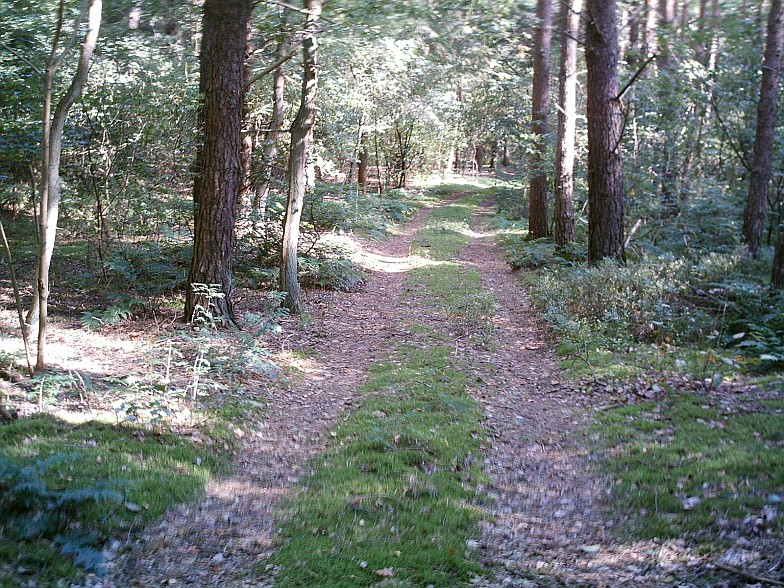
Forest Track in Hatten

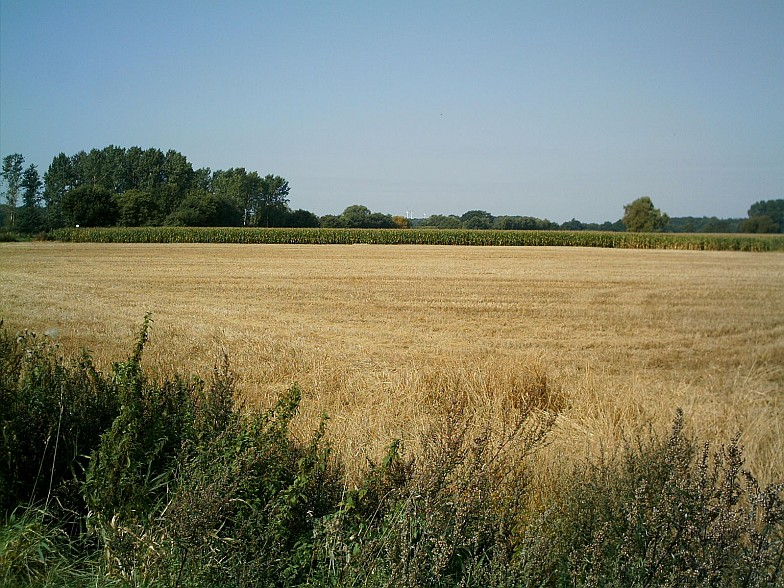
Agriculture in Hatten

== Municipal divisions ==
Hatten consists of the following divisions:

- Bümmerstede-Ost
- Dingstede
- Hatterwüsting 1 and 2
- Kirchhatten 1, 2 and 3
- Munderloh
- Sandhatten
- Sandkrug 1, 2 and 3
- Sandtange
- Schmede
- Streekermoor 1 and 2
- Tweelbäke-Ost

== Neighbouring municipalities ==
- North-West: Oldenburg
- North-East: Hude
- East: Ganderkesee
- South: Dötlingen
- North-North-West: Großenkneten
- West: Wardenburg

== Geography ==
- Overall land mass: 10,344 ha
- Economically utilised land mass: 6,946 ha
- Economically utilised land mass pertaining to agriculture: 6,115 ha
- Forested area: 2,550 ha
- Water bodies: 14 ha
- Residential and Farm buildings: 201 ha
- Moorland: 113 ha
- Miscellaneous remaining: 8 ha

== History and heritage ==
Hatten, or its internal division of Kirchhatten, was first attributed the name of "Hatho" in 860 AD. Derived from the Germanic dialects of Hathus or Hadu, the word may be loosely interpreted to relate to "War", "God of War" or "Fortunate Warrior".

Country Road and Field in Hatten

Further Agriculture in Hatten

Tacks from hunters exist from the Stone Age, as well as those of later Germanic tribes and saxons. Settlements are known to have developed in the region partially as a result of abundance of fruitful agricultural lands.

== Coat of arms ==
a) The dual fir trees may be regarded as an entrance; also, as a representation of the abundantly forested land
b) The centrally located shield is used to represent the historically-connected ownership of the area to the Oldenburger count
c) The stylised rose located in the upper portion is indicative of attributes of the land itself. Moreover, it may be traced to the oldest coat of arms of Oldenburg-Wildeshausen.

== Sons and daughters ==
- Peter Suhrkamp (1891-1959), German publisher
