= Steile Wand =

- Location within Lower Saxony

Highest point
- Elevation: 518.9 m above sea level (NN) (1,702 ft)
- Prominence: 24 m ↓ Crest of the Steile Wand ridge
- Isolation: 0.68 km → Grimmberg
- Coordinates: 51°40′30″N 10°22′57″E

Geography
- Location: northeast of Herzberg am Harz in Lower Saxony, Germany
- Parent range: Harz

The Steile Wand (literally "steep wall", or "steep face") is a 518.9-metre-high (1,702 ft) hill ridge in the southwestern part of the Harz Mountains in the German state of Lower Saxony.

== Geography ==
It lies about 3 kilometres northeast of the town of Herzberg am Harz and its north and northwest slopes drop steeply into the valley of the Sieber. Towards the east it transitions into the Höxterberg. The Steile Wand is entirely wooded; on the steep north side with conifers and on the crest of the ridge and its south side with deciduous woods. There is an old quarry on its steep northwest slope.

== Sources ==
- Topographic map 1:25,000 No. 4328, Bad Lauterberg im Harz
