= Adlersberg =

- Location within Lower Saxony

Highest point
- Elevation: 593.2 m (1,946 ft)
- Prominence: 53 m → Aschentalshalbe
- Isolation: 0.65 km → Aschentalshalbe
- Coordinates: 51°40′59″N 10°25′11″E

Geography
- Location: South of Sieber in Göttingen district in Lower Saxony
- Parent range: Harz mountains

The Adlersberg is a hill in the Harz mountains of central Germany that lies south of Sieber in the district of Göttingen in Lower Saxony. It is 593.2 m high and is situated west of the Aschentalshalbe. It also separates the valley of Breitental ("wide valley") with its river, the Tiefenbeek, from the Langental ("long valley"). To the northwest the Adlersberg transitions to the Kloppstert and the Fissenkenkopf hills. Other nearby peaks are the Pagelsburg 1.2 km south, the Höxterberg 1.6 km southwest and the Großer Knollen 1.9 km southeast.

== Sources ==
- Topographic map 1:25000, No. 4328 Bad Lauterberg im Harz
