= Wolfskopf =

- Location within Lower Saxony

Highest point
- Elevation: 668.5 m (2,193 ft)
- Coordinates: 51°45′40″N 10°25′24″E

Geography
- Location: Lower Saxony, Germany
- Parent range: Harz Mountains

The Wolfskopf ("Wolf's Head") is a 668.5 metre high mountain in the West Harz in central Germany. It lies in the district of Göttingen roughly 2 km east of Kamschlacken and about 5 km southwest of Altenau.

The Wolfsklippen crags, to the south which extend for about 60 metres in length (580 to 640 m above NN), are classed as a natural monument.

== See also ==
- List of mountains and hills in Lower Saxony

== Sources ==
- Topographische Karte 1:25000, No. 4228 Riefensbeek
