= Kuppe (Harz) =

- Location within Lower Saxony

Highest point
- Elevation: 729.1 m (2,392 ft)
- Prominence: 22 m ↓ Haus Sonnenberg
- Isolation: 1.5 km → Rehberg
- Coordinates: 51°43′36″N 10°30′31″E

Geography
- Location: north of St. Andreasberg, Lower Saxony, Germany
- Parent range: Harz Mountains

The Kuppe is a mountain in the Harz that lies north of Sankt Andreasberg in the district of Goslar in the German state of Lower Saxony. It is 729.1 metres high and is connected to the Jordanshöhe in the west.
