= Gehn =

Ridge in Lower Saxony

Coordinates: 52°26′N 7°55′E

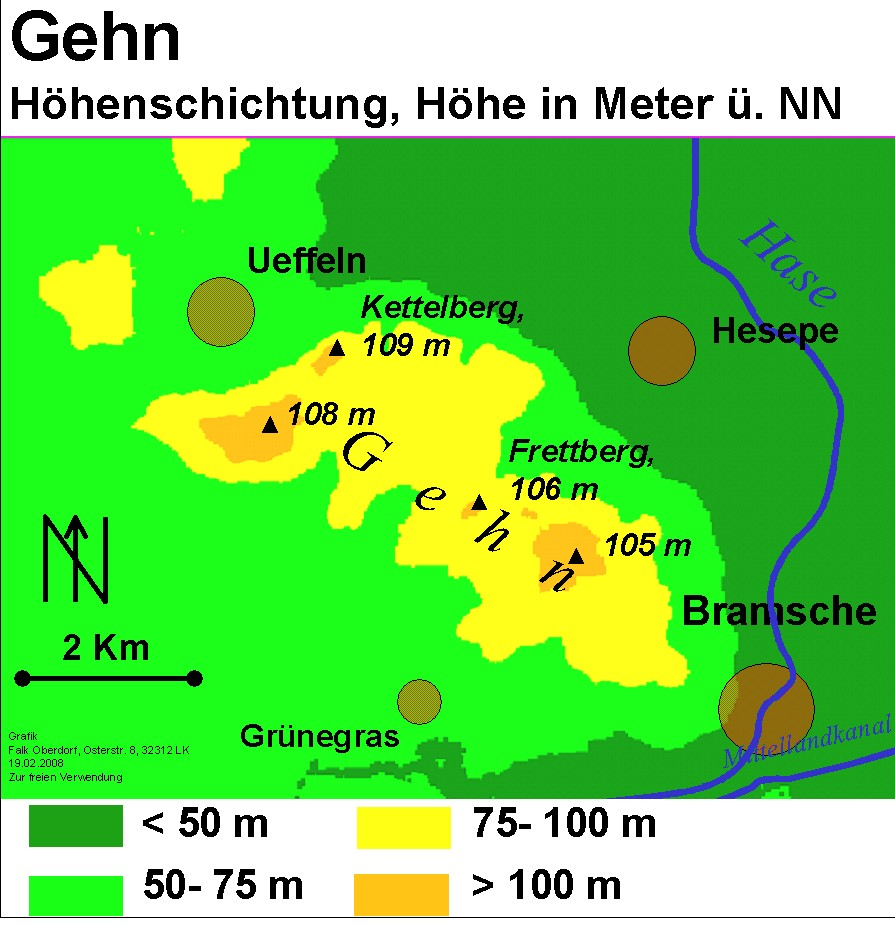
The highest hills in the Gehn are over 100 m high

The Gehn is a small ridge of hills between Bramsche and Ueffeln in Germany's Central Uplands, that are an extension of the Wiehen Hills (German: Wiehengebirge). The ridge runs from northwest to southeast and is about 5 kilometres (3.1 mi) long and an average of 2 kilometres (1.2 mi) wide. The highest point is the Kettelberg which is 108 m above sea level (NN) high. The Gehn forms a link between the Wiehen Hills and the Ankum Heights (Ankumer Höhe). It is largely forested and is not - like the Ankum Heights- part of a series of ice age terminal moraines from the latest event of the Saalian glaciation, the so-called Drenthe I stage, but is a ridge of Jurassic rock that was pushed up during the folding towards the end of the Cretaceous period.

Like the Wiehen Hills and the Ankum Heights, the Gehn belongs to the North Teutoburg Forest-Wiehen Hills Nature Park (Naturpark Nördlicher Teutoburger Wald-Wiehengebirge).

== Elevations ==
Amongst the main elevations on the Gehn are the:

- Kettelsberg (108.6 m above sea level (NN))
- Gehnberg (108.1 m)
- Heseper Berg (107.9 m)
- Frettberg (105.9 m)
