= Pagelsburg =

- Location within Lower Saxony

Highest point
- Elevation: 545 m above sea level (NN) (1,788 ft)
- Prominence: 22 m ↓ Adlerbergweg
- Isolation: 0.32 km → Großer Knollen
- Coordinates: 51°40′20″N 10°25′07″E

Geography
- Location: south of Sieber, Göttingen district, Lower Saxony, Germany
- Parent range: Harz Mountains

The Pagelsburg is a hill in the Harz Mountains of central Germany, which lies south of Sieber in the district of Göttingen in Lower Saxony. It is 545 m above sea level (NN) and lies 1.2 km south of the Adlersberg, 0.9 kilometres east of the Höxterberg and 1.0 kilometre northwest of the Großer Knollen.

== Literature ==
- Kurt Mohr: Sammlung Geologischer Führer Band 58, Harz Westlicher Teil, 5th edition, Stuttgart 1998, ISBN 3-443-15071-3, pages 146-147
