= Kloppstert =

Hill in Lower Saxony

- Location within Lower Saxony

Highest point
- Elevation: 553 m above sea level (NN) (1,814 ft)
- Prominence: 10 m
- Isolation: 0.2 km → Adlersberg
- Coordinates: 51°41′08″N 10°25′01″E

Geography
- Location: south of Sieber, Lower Saxony, Germany
- Parent range: Harz Mountains

The Kloppstert is a hill, roughly 553 metres (1,814 ft) high, in the southwestern Harz in Lower Saxony, Germany. In the topographical map printed in 1978 it can only be made out with difficulty that the third letter is an o and the penultimate one an r. However, a contour line runs over the letter r so that it looks like a p. In the digitalised 1:25,000 topographic map, the hill is wrongly named as the Klappstept.

== Geography ==
The hill lies about 1 kilometre (0.62 mi) south of Sieber, 570 metres (1,870 ft) east of the Fissenkenkopf and 370 metres (1,210 ft) northwest of the Adlersberg.

Other hills of the same name lie in the Harz near Lerbach and near Badenhausen as well as in the Solling hills southwest of Dassel.
