= Jordanshöhe =

- Location within Lower Saxony

Highest point
- Elevation: 723 m (2,372 ft)
- Isolation: 1.212 km → Kuppe
- Coordinates: 51°43′22″N 10°31′27″E

Geography
- Location: north of Sankt Andreasberg in Goslar district in Lower Saxony
- Parent range: Harz Mountains

The Jordanshöhe is a mountain, roughly 723 m above sea level (NHN), in the Harz in central Germany. It lies north of the town of Sankt Andreasberg in the district of Goslar in Lower Saxony. To the west is the Kuppe. On the mountain there is the Jordanshöhe youth hostel and the Jordanshöhe nature trail (Gesteinskundlichen Lehrpfad Jordanshöhe).
