= Harz-Heide Road =

Street in Germany

The Harz-Heide Road is a road that runs over the Harz mountains in Germany through heath (German: Heide) landscape and which is known for its scenery.

It runs from Göttingen along the B 27 and B 446 federal highways to Duderstadt and Herzberg. From there it continues on the B 27 to Bad Lauterberg and Braunlage. It then follows the B 4 through Bad Harzburg, Vienenburg, Wolfenbüttel, Braunschweig, Gifhorn and Uelzen to the town of Lüneburg.

== Literature ==
- Heinz Grunow (1955), Heinz Gleitze, Heinz Ohlendorf (ed.), "Die schöne Harz-Heide-Straße", Heimatkalender für den Landkreis Wolfenbüttel (in German), Schöppenstedt: Hans Oeding, pp. 53-56, OCLC 23370531
