= Grinderwald =

- Location within Lower Saxony

Highest point
- Peak: Hüttenberg
- Elevation: 101 m above NN

Geography
- Location: Hanover Region, Nienburg/Weser
- Country: Germany
- State: Lower Saxony
- Range coordinates: 52.57167°N 9.37194°E

The Grinderwald is a mixed forest and a low hill range, up to 101 m above sea level (NN), in Hanover Region and the Lower Saxon district of Nienburg/Weser in Germany.

== Geology ==
The Grinderwald is an Old Drift plateau that was formed from deposits of boulders and debris during the Ice Age.

== Hills ==
Amongst the high points in the hillocky terrain of the Grinderwalds are the following, sorted by height in metres (m) above sea level (NN):

- Hüttenberg (101 m)
- Himberg (98.8 m)
- Eckberge (91 m)
- Lichtenberg (85.4 m)
- Masekersberg (83.1 m)
- Spielberg (76.0 m)
- Lehmberg (72.8 m)
- Reihersberg (71 m)
- Brand (67.3 m)
- Uhlenberg (65.8 m)
- Saalhorstberg (62 m)
