= Langfast =

Coordinates: 51°41′N 10°23′E

The Langfast is a ridge in the district of Göttingen in North Germany. This ridge, with a height of 606 metres (1,988 ft), is located in the South Harz mountains between Herzberg am Harz and Sieber.
