= Osenberge =

Dune region in Germany

Coordinates: 53°1′34.3″N 8°17′3.1″E

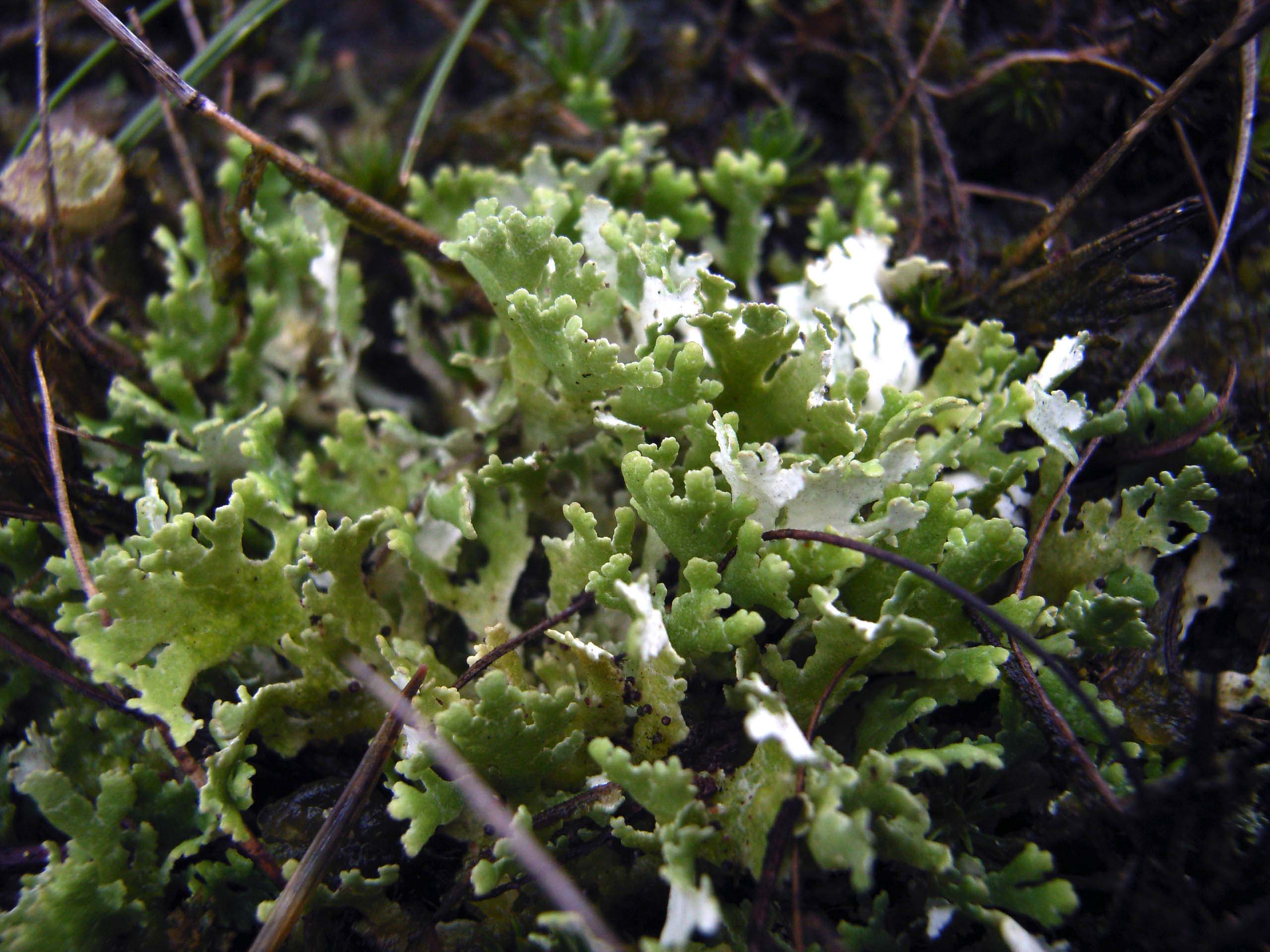
The lichen Cladonia foliacea in the Osenberge

The Osenberge is a dune region up to 23 m above sea level (NN) high in the district of Oldenburg, Lower Saxony (Germany).

== Geographical location ==
The rolling dunes of the Osenberge are located in the northwest of the Wildeshausen Geest Nature Park, on average about 14 km (8.7 mi) (as the crow flies) south of Oldenburg, directly south of Sandkrug and immediately northwest of Sandhatten, both of which lie within the municipality of Hatten. To the west the Osenberge are passed by a section of the River Hunte in a south–north direction; to the northwest lies Wardenburg.

The Osenberge are the highest elevations in the region, for example the town of Oldenburg is only about 5 to 7 m above sea level. Its two highest peaks, both 23 m above NN high, are the Kistenberg south of Sandkrug and the Gierenberg northwest of Sandhatten. From the latter so-called hill there is a good view of the valley of the Hunte. Within the forested or wooded area of Barneführerholz the Osenberge are mainly covered by old pines.

== History ==
The sand-rich landscape of the Osenberge was formed by the glaciers of the last ice age (Weichselian glaciation) through glacial bursts and outwash.

Legend has it that dwarves used to live in the Osenberge. In addition the legend of Oldenburger Wunderhorn, a medieval drinking horn from Oldenburg, now in Copenhagen, is set in the Osenberge.

== Access ==
The Osenberge can be reached on town bus line no. 315 operated by the Oldenburg Transport and Water Company (Oldenburger Verkehr und Wasser GmbH); alight in Sandkrug at the Mühlenweg bus stop.
