= Rehberg (Harz) =

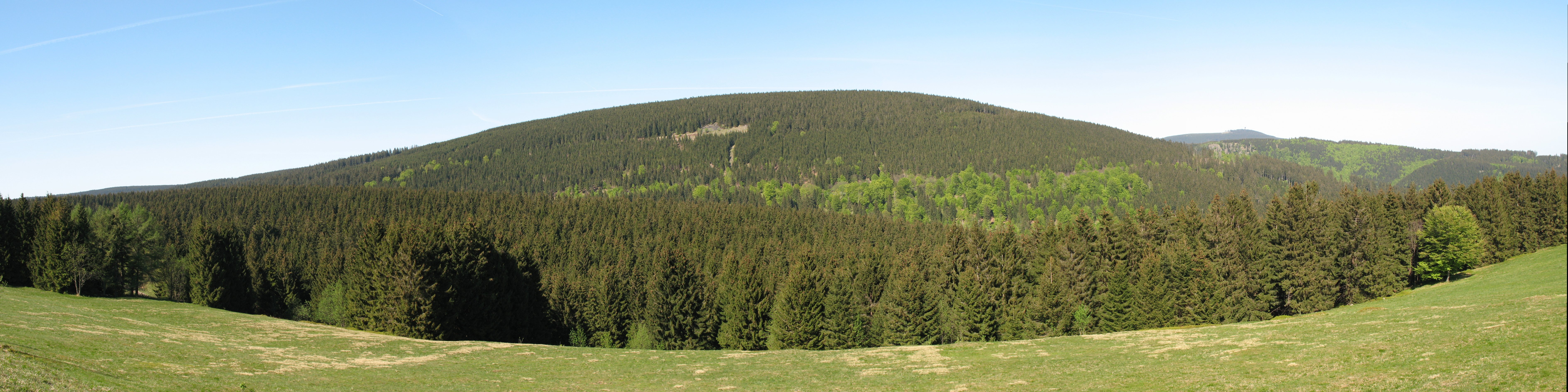
- South side of the Rehberg from the Jordanshöhe in Sankt Andreasberg

Highest point
- Elevation: 893 m above sea level (NN) (2,930 ft)
- Prominence: 122 m → Bruchberg
- Isolation: 3.2 km → Achtermannshöhe
- Coordinates: 51°44′26″N 10°32′17″E

Geography
- Location within Lower Saxony
- Location: Lower Saxony, Germany
- Parent range: Harz Mountains

At 893 metres (2,930 feet) above sea level, the Rehberg (German pronunciation: [ˈʁeːˌbɛʁk]) in the Harz mountains is the fourth highest mountain in the German state of Lower Saxony, and the fifth-highest in the Harz.

== Location and access ==
It is located in the Harz National Park immediately north of Sankt Andreasberg. Its summit is a broad, flat dome, much of which is forested. It is not easily accessible because the route from the Rehberg 'ski cross' (Rehberger Skikreuz) was renaturalised several years ago by the Harz National Park as part of its nature conservation planning. In addition, in the region of the summit a marsh biotope has been created by artificial water damming. Along the mountain's eastern and southern sides run two tracks: the Rehberger Grabenweg, with its tavern, the Rehberger Grabenhaus (checkpoint 155 in the Harzer Wandernadel system. Higher up is the Rehberger Planweg which takes walkers and cross-country skiers around the mountain.

== Observatory ==
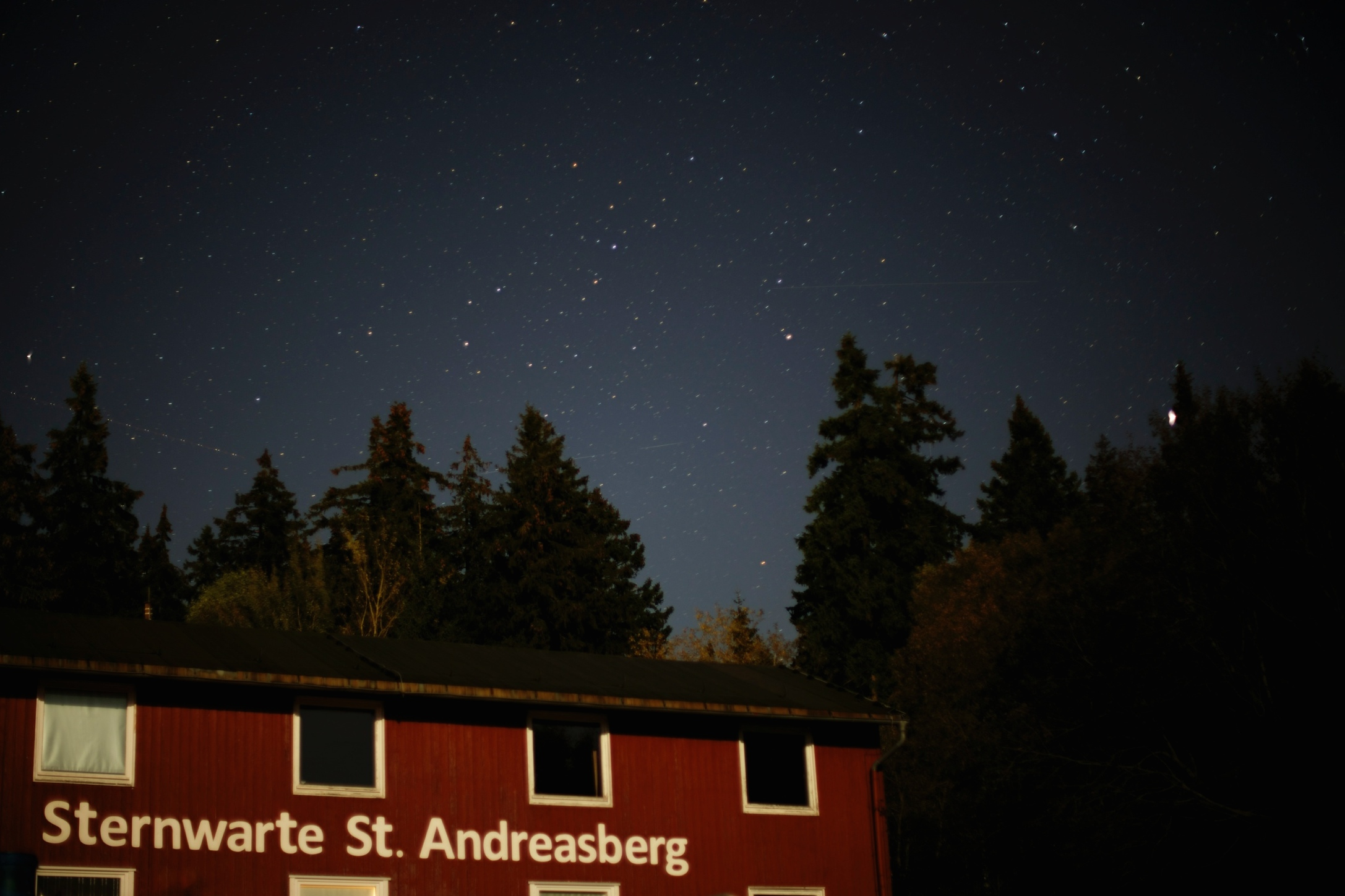
Sankt Andreasberg Observatory

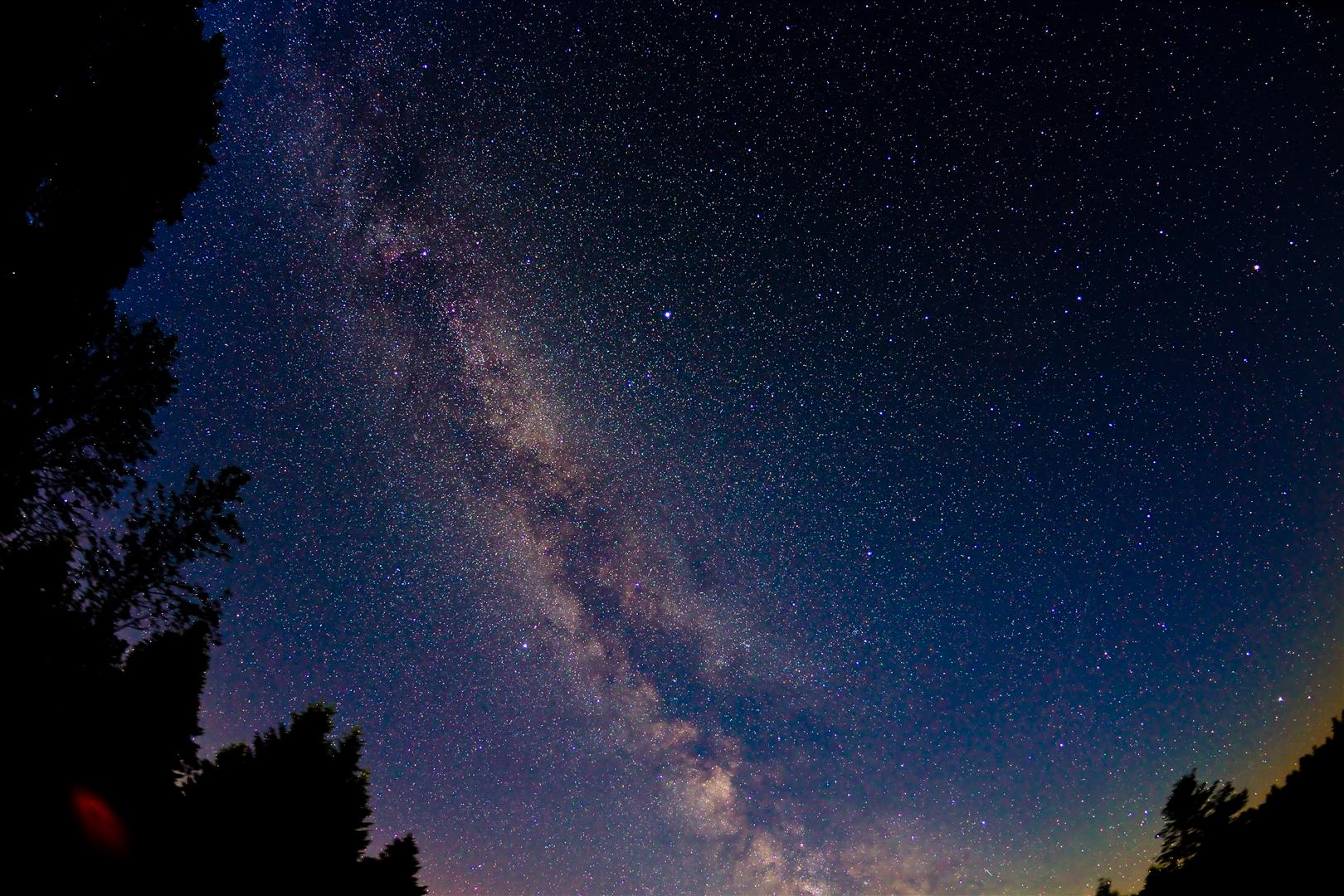
Almost natural view of the Milky Way, taken in the Harz Observatory

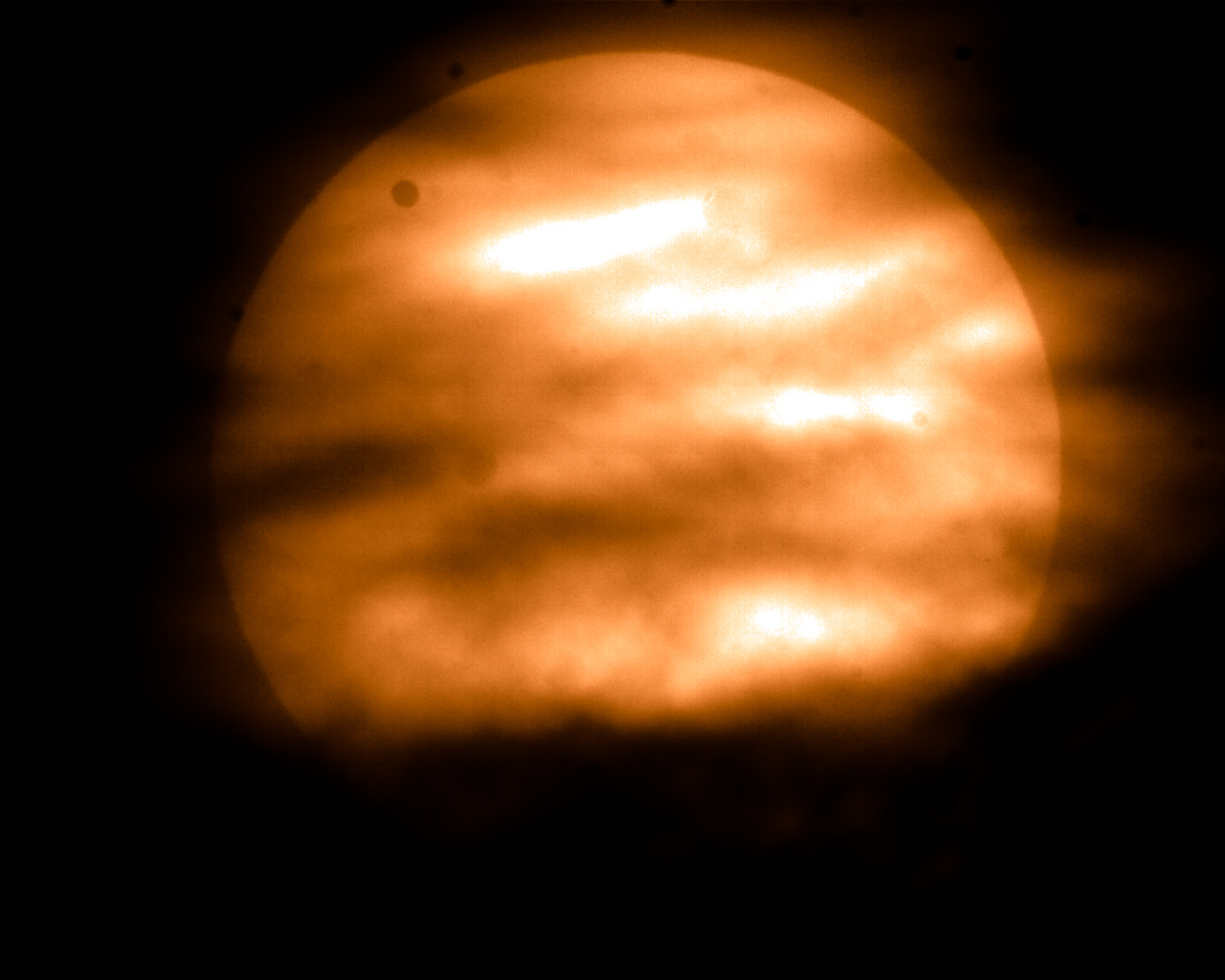
Transit of Venus, taken in the Harz Observatory

Due to its location and the lack of habitation on and around the Rehberg, it has an almost natural dark night sky with a surface brightness of 21.75 mag/arcsec². For this reason the Sankt Andreasberg Observatory Society (Sternwarte Sankt Andreasberg e. V.) selected a building on the southwestern part of the mountain as the site for its barrier-free observatory.

== See also ==
- List of mountains and hills in Lower Saxony
- List of mountains in the Harz
