= Calenberg Land =

Historic landscape in Germany

Coordinates: 52°19′0″N 9°36′0″E

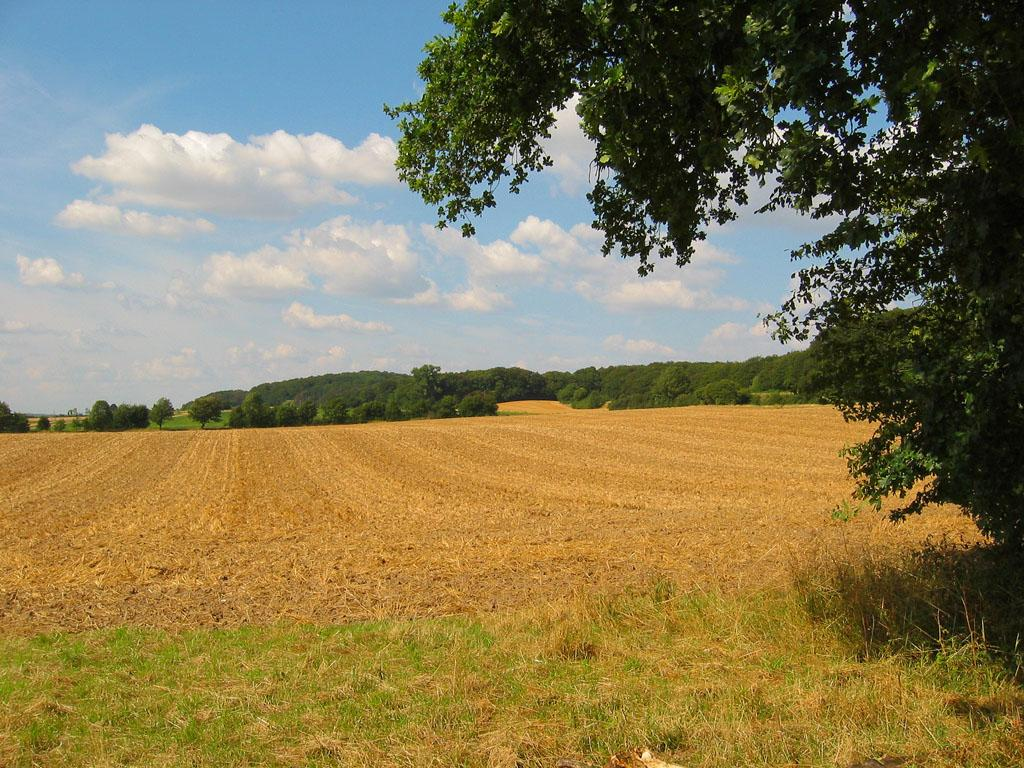
Field on a side of the Gehrdener Berg

The Calenberg Land (German: Calenberger Land) is an historic landscape southwest of Hanover in Germany, roughly formed by the rural area between the Leine and the Deister hills. The name of this landscape comes from the Principality of Calenberg that ruled the area during the Middle Ages with its seat at Calenberg Castle near Pattensen.

== Geography ==
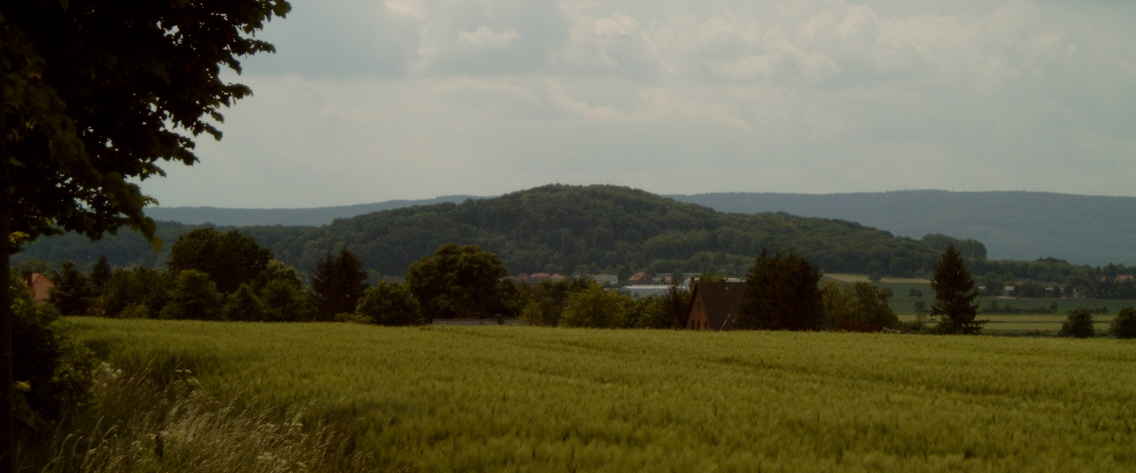
Gehrdener Berg, with the Deister in the background

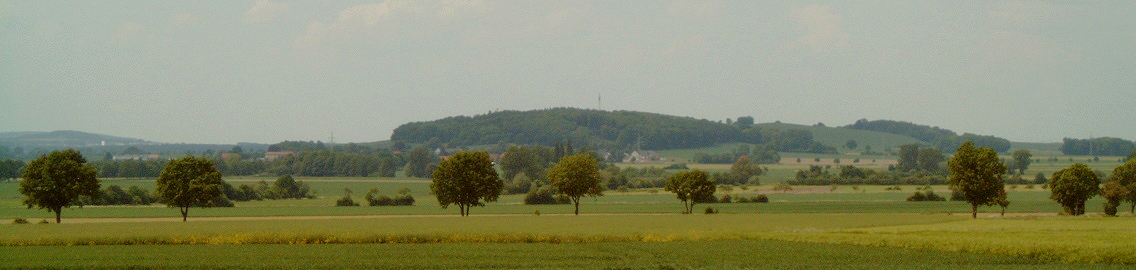
Stemmer Berg

Today Calenberg Land covers a geographical area of about 20 by 30 kilometres (12 mi × 19 mi) that lies on the left bank of the Leine river, bordered to the west by the hills of the Deister, Kleiner Deister and Osterwald and to the north by Hanover and the line of the A 2 motorway towards Wunstorf. Its name does not derive from the hill known as the Kalenberg on the Deister.

The region includes the Calenberg Loess Börde (Calenburger Lössbörde) which was formed during and after the Weichselian glaciation. Strong north winds deposited the loess soil in layers between 0.2 and 2 metres (7.9 in and 6 ft 6.7 in) thick, the upper layers of which became loam. The area is heavily dominated by arable farming as a result of its fertile soils. The elevations of the Marienberg, crowned by Schloss Marienburg (135 metres or 443 feet AMSL), Süllberg (199 metres or 653 feet), Benther Berg (173 metres or 568 feet), Gehrdener Berg (154 metres or 505 feet) and Stemmer Berg (122 metres or 400 feet) dominate the otherwise gently rolling hills.

Under the Calenberg Land lie natural resources, extraction of which dates to the Middle Ages. There are coal deposits in the Deister, potash salts that were mined at Ronnenberg and Benthe, sandstone and limestone in the Deister and Kleine Deister, clay for baking bricks, and sand and gravel in the river terraces of the Leine.

=== Towns and villages ===
- Barsinghausen
- Gehrden
- Hemmingen
- Pattensen
- Ronnenberg
- Seelze
- Springe
- Wennigsen
- Wunstorf

The towns of the Calenberg Land developed in the Middle Ages as the ruling classes conferred self-administration and market rights. All of them remained farming towns, in which many of the inhabitants continued to work on the land. Whilst today the majority of population of the Calenberg Land commutes into Hanover, Hanover's citizens use the region as their local recreation area.

== History ==
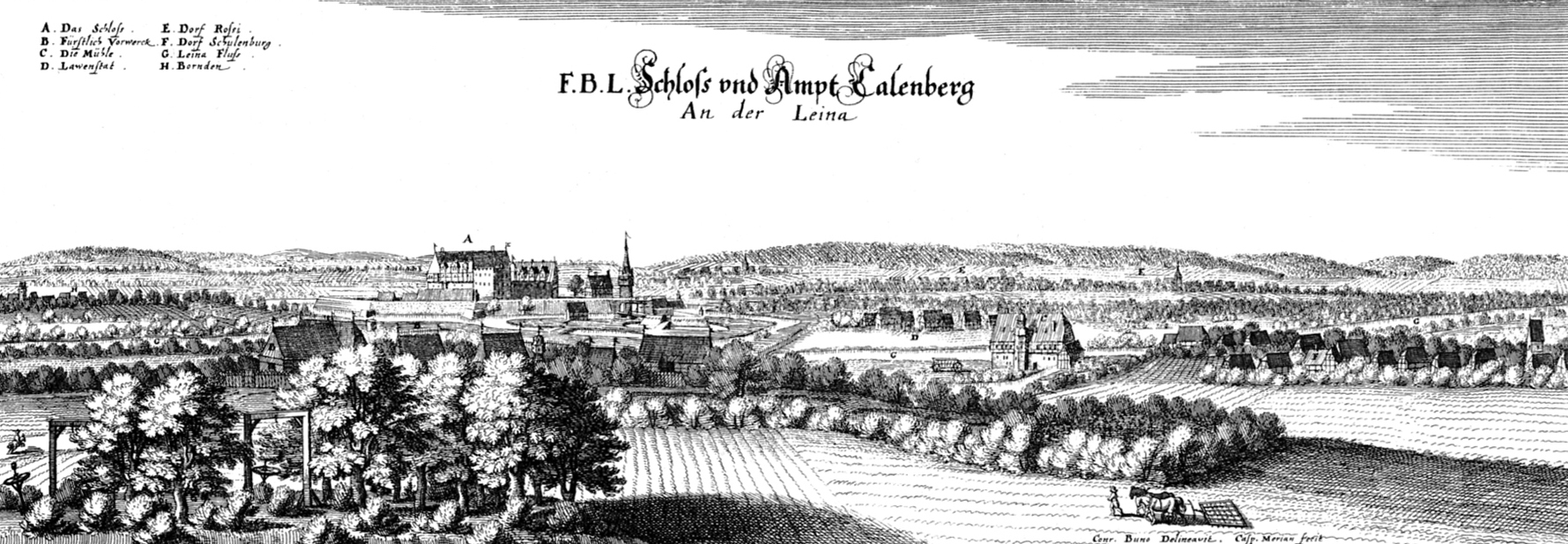
The Calenberg Land and Calenberg Castle in a Merian engraving of 1654

The present-day geographical region of Calenberg Land roughly corresponds to the Germanic area of Marstemgau which was ruled by the House of Billung in the Early Middle Ages. In the 12th century various fiefdoms emerged that were exploited by noble families from the region who were enfeoffed by the bishops of Minden and Hildesheim. These were the counts of Wölpe (Nienburg/Weser), of Roden (Wunstorf), of Schaumburg, of Schwalenberg (Barsinghausen), of Spiegelberg (Lauenstein) and of Hallermund (Springe). At that time the counts founded a number of abbeys, including Mariensee, Marienwerder, Barsinghausen, Wennigsen and Wülfinghausen. In the 13th century the House of Welf gained the upper hand in Calenberg Land, although it was not called that. They bought out the counts and their estates, or defeated their feudal heads in the form of the bishops of Hildesheim and Minden. In the 13th century the Welfs built the water castle of Calenberg south of Hanover in the vicinity of the Leine. Out of that emerged the Welf sub-principality of Calenberg.

In this way the land ruled by the Principality of Calenberg emerged, which was formerly much larger than the Calenberg Land is today. In the 15th century it stretched as far north as Nienburg/Weser and as far southwest as Hamelin. In 1495 the Principality of Calenberg was united with the Principality of Göttingen to become the Principality of Calenberg-Göttingen.

In 1519, during the Hildesheim Feud (Hildesheimer Stiftsfehde), there was serious devastation in the region. A map published in 1590 depicts almost all the settlements in the Calenberg Land as burning. In 1542 the area became Lutheran thanks to the work of the widowed duchess, Elisabeth of Brandenburg (1510–1558), and Anton Corvinus carried out the Reformation at her request. An attempt to re-catholicise the area by Eric II, Duke of Calenberg during the Schmalkaldic War failed due to popular resistance.

In 1625, during the Thirty Years War, the forces of Tilly invaded and captured the castle of Calenberg after a three-week siege. Tilly ruled the whole of the Calenberg Land with the exception of Hanover. The castle was not recaptured until 1633.

Calenberg Land was incorporated into the Landdrostei, later Regierungsbezirk of Hanover in 1823 together with Hoya and Diepholz. After the dissolution of the Regierungsbezirke and their governments in Lower Saxony in 2004 it became part of Hanover Region. Since the 19th century there has been an economic boom in the Calenberg Land as a result of more intensive use of its geological and agricultural resources, such as potash mining and intensive sugar beet farming by cement factories and sugar refineries respectively.

== Sights ==
- Bennigser Burg
- Calenberg Castle
- Hallermund Castle
- Wülfinghausen Abbey
- Saupark Springe
- Marienburg Castle
- Springe Bison Enclosure

== See also ==
- Kingdom of Hanover
- Calenberger Neustadt

== General references ==
- Hauptmeyer, Carl-Hans (1983). Calenberg, Geschichte und Gesellschaft einer niedersächsischen Landschaft (in German). Hanover: Fackelträger. ISBN 3-7716-1437-6.
