= Fissenkenkopf =

- Location within Lower Saxony

Highest point
- Elevation: 527 m (1,729 ft)
- Prominence: 22 m
- Isolation: 0.45 km → Kloppstert
- Coordinates: 51°41′07″N 10°24′33″E

Geography
- Location: southwest of Sieber in Göttingen district in Lower Saxony
- Parent range: Harz

The Fissenkenkopf is a hill in the Harz Mountains of Germany, that rises south of Sieber in the district of Göttingen in Lower Saxony. It is 527 metres high and is the western extension of the Adlersberg and the Kloppstert hills.

== Sources ==
- Topographic map 1:25,000 series, No. 4328 Bad Lauterberg im Harz
