= Benther Berg =

Ridge

- Location within Lower Saxony

Highest point
- Elevation: 173.3 m above sea level (NN) (569 ft)
- Prominence: 109 m → Deister
- Isolation: 9.5 km → Süllberg
- Coordinates: 52°20′18″N 9°36′58″E

Geography
- Location: Lower Saxony, Germany

The Benther Berg is a ridge, up to 173.3 m above sea level (NN), in the Calenberg Land near Benthe in Hanover Region in the German state of Lower Saxony.

== Location ==
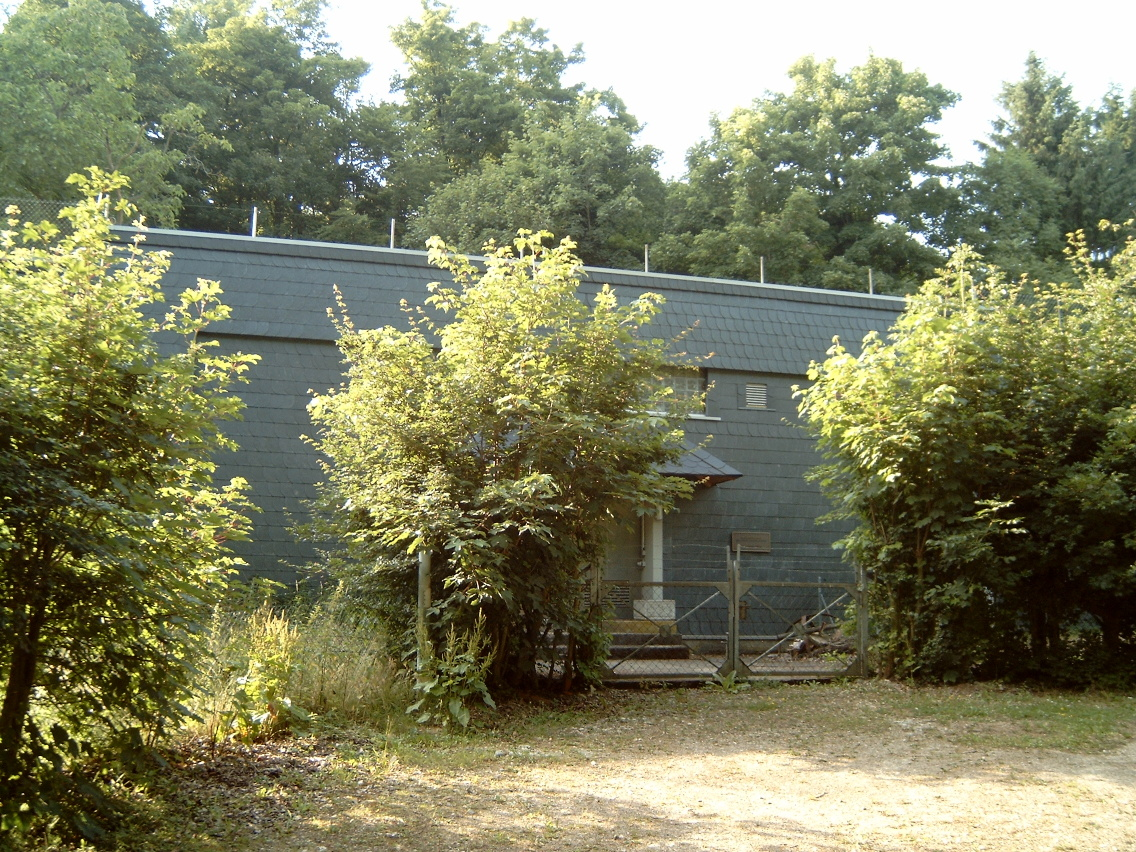
On the Benther Berg; a Harzwasserwerke water tank

The Benther Berg is about 3.5 kilometres long and 500 m wide. It lies west-southwest of the city of Hanover and borders immediately on the city boundary.

It lies between the following towns and villages: Lenthe (borough of Gehrden) to the north and, somewhater further away in each case, Velber (borough of Seelze) to the north-northeast and the Hanoverian villages of Badenstedt and Davenstedt to the northeast.

Immediately on its slopes are Benthe, that belongs to the borough of Ronnenberg, and the settlement to the south near the Seven Stocky Stones. On the far side of Benthe to the east is Empelde. To the south on the slope of the Benther Berg is Everloh with its manor of Erichshof and to the west is Northen (both in the borough of Gehrden). The Bundesstraße 65 federal road runs by the ridge, roughly in an east-west direction, to the south and east.

== History ==
On the Benther Berg are protohistorical tumuli from the Bronze Age. The name of the hill comes from the nearby village of Benthe to the south.

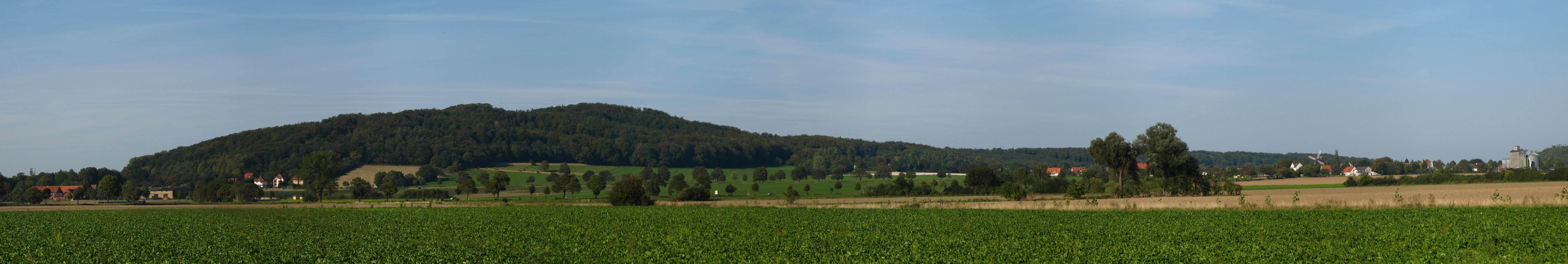
View from the south of the Benther Berg with Erichshof Manor House (Rittergut Erichshof) near Everloh (left) and the settlement near the Sieben Trappen Steinen that belongs to Benthe (right)

== Sources ==
- Hannovers Natur entdecken, erleben, verstehen. Arbeitskreis des Verbandes Deutscher Biologen (Landesverband Niedersachsen). ed. by Elisabeth von Falkenhausen (et al.). Seelze-Velber: Kallmeyer 1998. ISBN 3-7800-5263-6
