= Höxterberg =

- Location within Lower Saxony

Highest point
- Elevation: 584 m (1,916 ft)
- Prominence: 84 m ↓ Jägerfleck → Großer Knollen
- Isolation: 1.2 km → Großer Knollen
- Coordinates: 51°40′20″N 10°24′21″E

Geography
- Location: south of Sieber in Göttingen district in Lower Saxony
- Parent range: Harz

The Höxterberg is a hill in the Harz Mountains of central Germany, that lies south of Sieber in the district of Göttingen in Lower Saxony. It is 584 metres high and lie 0.9 kilometres west of the Pagelsburg, 1.5 kilometres south of the Fissenkenkopf, 1.8 km west of the Großer Knollen and 1 kilometre north of the Mittelecke. The hill is mostly covered by beech woods. Towards the northwest the Höxterberg transitions into the Steile Wand.

== Sources ==
- Topographische Karte 1:25000, Nr. 4328 Bad Lauterberg im Harz
