= Breitentalskopf =

- Location within Lower Saxony

Highest point
- Elevation: 579.1 m (1,900 ft)
- Prominence: 39 m ↓ Gropenborn
- Isolation: 1,365 km → Gropenbornskopf
- Coordinates: 51°41′36″N 10°25′51″E

Geography
- Location: southeast of Sieber in Göttingen district in Lower Saxony, Germany
- Parent range: Harz Mountains

The Breitentalskopf is a hill in the Harz Mountains of central Germany, that rises southeast of Sieber in the district of Göttingen in Lower Saxony. It is 579.1 m high and separates the River Sieber from the Breitental valley (with its stream, the Tiefenbeek), that gave the hill its name. Towards the southeast is the ridge of the Aschentalshalbe.

== Sources ==
- Topographic map 1:25000, No. 4328 Bad Lauterberg in Harz
