= Aschentalshalbe =

- Location within Lower Saxony

Highest point
- Elevation: 685 m (2,247 ft)
- Prominence: 114 m → Großer Knollen
- Isolation: 2.596 km → Großer Knollen
- Coordinates: 51°41′07″N 10°27′06″E

Geography
- Location: south of Sieber in Göttingen district in Lower Saxony, Germany

The Aschentalshalbe is a ridge in the Harz Mountains of Germany that is up to 685 m above sea level (NN). It lies south of the village of Sieber in the unincorporated area of Harz in the district of Göttingen in the state of Lower Saxony.

== Name ==
The Aschentalshalbe was named after the Aschental ("Aschen valley"), a southern branch of the Tiefenbeekstal ("Tiefenbeek valley"), through which the Tiefenbeek flows.

== Geography ==
=== Location ===
The Aschentalshalbe lies in the Upper Harz within the Harz Nature Park about 2 km southeast of Sieber, a village northeast of Herzberg am Harz. It rises between the Gropenbornskopf to the north, the Koboltstaler Köpfe to the northeast with their outlier, the Gödeckenkopf, to the east, the Schadenbeeksköpfe to the southeast, the Übelsberg to the south, the Großer Knollen to the south-southwest, the Pagelsburg to the southwest, the Adlersberg to the west and the Breitentalskopf to the northwest.

=== Watershed ===
The watershed between the Sieber to the north and west and the Oder to the east and south runs over the Aschentalshalbe. Whilst the Tiefenbeek that rises north of the mountain flows northwest into the Sieber, the Grade Lutter that rises on its southern uplands is the right headstream of the Lutter that flows southwards into the Oder.

== Summits and survey points ==
The Aschentalshalbe has several summits:

- The western summit (Westkuppe), also called Hohes Feld is 667 m metres high. There is a view of the Sieber from the top.
- The two main summits, which are roughly in the centre of the ridge, are the highest points at about 685 m above sea level
- The east-northeast summit is about 640 m metres high. Just to the southeast is a trig point on the map (627.0 m). From there and the refuge hut, a little to the east, the view drops away to the south.

== Walking ==
Harz Club trail no. 15 G runs over the Aschentalshalbe from which several footpaths lead to the neighbouring summits. There is a refuge hut with the Schadenbeeksköpfe checkpoint of the Harzer Wandernadel hiking network near the eastern summit of the Aschentalshalbe. The hut is around 1.25 km east-northeast of the mountain and about 1 km north of the northwestern summit of the nearby Schadenbeeksköpfe.

== Sources ==
- Topographic map 1:25,000 series, No. 4328, Bad Lauterberg im Harz
