= Bremke (disambiguation) =

Bremke is the name of the following geographical features:

== Rivers ==
- Bremke, river near Braunlage in the county of Goslar, Lower Saxony
- Bremke (river), a 4.7 km (3 mi) long headstream of the Bode River in Saxony-Anhalt and Lower Saxony, Germany
- Bremke, river near Scharzfeld in the county of Osterode am Harz, Lower Saxony

== Places ==
- Bremke (Eslohe), village in the municipality of Eslohe in the Hochsauerlandkreis, North Rhine-Westphalia
- Bremke, village in the borough of Extertal in the county of Lippe, North Rhine-Westphalia
- Bremke, village in the borough of Gleichen in the county of Göttingen, Lower Saxony
- Bremke, village in the borough of Halle (Weserbergland) in the county of Holzminden, Lower Saxony
- Oettern-Bremke, village in the borough of Detmold in the county of Lippe, North Rhine-Westphalia
