= Kleiner Knollen =

- Location within Lower Saxony

Highest point
- Elevation: 631 m above sea level (NN) (2,070.2 ft)
- Prominence: 41 m → Großer Knollen
- Isolation: 0.8 km → Großer Knollen
- Coordinates: 51°39′42″N 10°25′12″E

Geography
- Location: Lower Saxony, Germany
- Parent range: Harz Mountains

The Kleiner Knollen is a 631 metre high mountain in the southwestern part of the Harz in the German state of Lower Saxony.

== Geography ==
The Kleiner Knollen is located east of Herzberg am Harz, northeast of Scharzfeld, northwest of Bad Lauterberg im Harz and south of Sieber. It is dominated by the Großen Knollen (687 m), about 1 km to the northeast. The Kleiner Knollen is afforested by spruce.

== Forest ==
Today the lower slopes of the Kleiner Knollen are predominantly covered by beech trees and its upper slopes by spruce. In 1596 it was entirely covered in beech trees, in 1630 also partly with sycamore.

== Sources ==
- Topographische Karte 1:25000, No. 4328 Bad Lauterberg im Harz
