= Schadenbeeksköpfe =

- Location within Lower Saxony

Highest point
- Elevation: 605 m (1,985 ft)
- Prominence: 10 m
- Isolation: 0.2 km → Aschentalshalbe
- Coordinates: 51°40′40″N 10°27′43″E

Geography
- Location: southeast of Sieber in Göttingen district, Lower Saxony
- Parent range: Harz Mountains

The Schadenbeeksköpfe are two summits on a southeastern outlier of the Aschentalshalbe in the Harz Mountains of Germany, about 3.6 kilometres southeast of Sieber in the district of Göttingen in Lower Saxony. Their highest peak is 605 metres above sea level. In addition they separate the Schadenbeek stream, after which they were named, from the upper Krumme Lutter. About 1 kilometre east of the Schadenbeeksköpfe lies the Wolkenhügel Pit (Grube Wolkenhügel), in the valley of the Krumme Lutter, which closed in June 2007. A refuge hut not far from the Schadenbeeksköpfe is a checkpoint (no. 153) in the Harzer Wandernadel hiking badge system.

== Woods ==
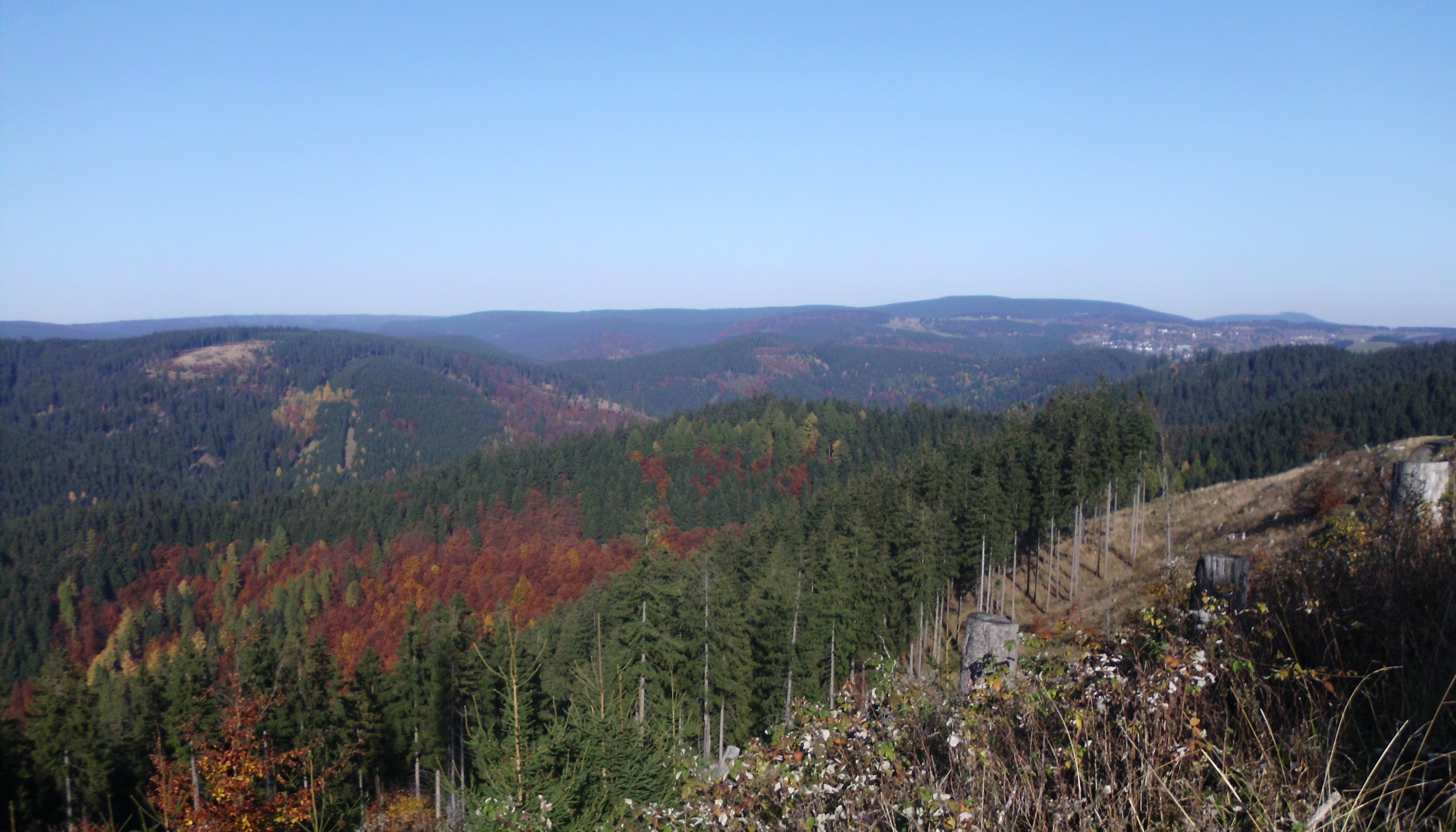
View from the Schadenbeeksköpfe near Sieber

Today the upper slopes of the Schadenbeeksköpfe are mainly covered by spruce whilst, lower down, deciduous woods also occur. In the year 1596 they were still completely covered by beech.

== Sources ==
- Topographische Karte 1:25000, Nr. 4328 Bad Lauterberg im Harz
