= Stöckse =

- Municipality
- Coat of arms

- Location of Stöckse within Nienburg/Weser district
- Interactive map of Stöckse
- Location within Germany Location within Lower Saxony
- Coordinates: 52°38′09″N 09°20′19″E
- Country: Germany
- State: Lower Saxony
- District: Nienburg/Weser
- Municipal assoc.: Steimbke

Government
  - Mayor: Dieter Vehrenkamp (CDU)

Area
  - Total: 38.57 km^{2} (14.89 sq mi)
- Elevation: 46 m (151 ft)

Population (2025-12-31)
  - Total: 1,253
  - Density: 32.49/km^{2} (84.14/sq mi)
- Time zone: UTC+01:00 (CET)
  - Summer (DST): UTC+02:00 (CEST)
- Postal codes: 31638
- Dialling codes: 05026, 05021 (Führser Mühle)
- Vehicle registration: NI

Stöckse is a municipality in the district of Nienburg, in Lower Saxony, Germany. It is situated in the forest "Krähe" between Langendamm and Steimbke.

== Policy ==
=== Municipality Stöckse ===
The villages Stöckse and Wenden with district Lohe form the municipality (Gemeinde) Stöckse, part of collective municipality (Samtgemeinde) Steimbke.

=== Municipal council ===
The municipal council (Gemeinderat) Stöckse has 11 members elected and a mayor elected directly. Since the local elections on September 10, 2006, two parties and one selector's community (Wählergemeinschaft) represent it.

- CDU - 6 seats
- SPD - 2 seats
- WG Stöckse - 3 seats

== Culture ==
=== Theatre ===
In Stöckse there is an open-air theatre. The stage is situated in a short part of forest in the city of Stöckse and accommodates 700 visitors. The audience is amused with comedies and stories in Low German, and a children's theatre themed "children play for children". Furthermore, the open-air theatre is a favoured arena for many special events different typed. Supra-regional known the in 1951 formatted open-air theatre is since 1986, since the foundation of the registered association and the der accession to the Verband Deutscher Freilichtbühnen (VDF).

=== Sightseeing ===
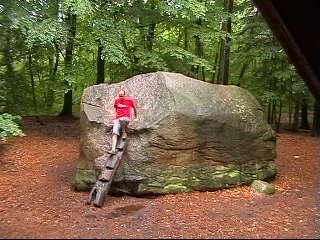
"Giebichenstein" in Stöckse

There is the Stöckser See, a small lake. Worth seeing is the Giebichenstein, a large erratic dating from the Ice Age and the cairns from Bronze Age.
