= Übelsberg =

- Location within Lower Saxony

Highest point
- Elevation: 651.3 m (2,137 ft)
- Prominence: 30 m → Aschentalshalbe
- Isolation: 0.85 km → Aschentalshalbe
- Coordinates: 51°40′34″N 10°26′57″E

Geography
- Location: Southwest of Sieber in Göttingen district in Lower Saxony, Germany
- Parent range: Harz Mountains

The Übelsberg is a 651.3 metre high mountain in the South Harz, which lies southwest of Sieber in the district of Göttingen in Lower Saxony. It sits astride the watershed between the Grade Lutter and the Krumme Lutter rivers. The mountain is linked via a ridge to the Aschentalshalbe in the north and the Mittelberg in the south.

== Sources ==
- Topographische Karte 1:25000, Nr. 4328 Bad Lauterberg im Harz
