= Koboltstaler Köpfe =

Mountains in Lower Saxony, Germany

- Location within Lower Saxony

Highest point
- Elevation: 673 m above sea level (NN) (2,208 ft)
- Prominence: 68 m ↓ Gödeckeplatz → Aschentalshalbe
- Isolation: 1.6 km → Aschentalshalbe
- Coordinates: 51°41′16″N 10°28′51″E

Geography
- Location: East of Sieber in Göttingen district in Lower Saxony, Germany
- Parent range: Harz Mountains

The Koboltstaler Köpfe ("Kobolt Valley Peaks") are a group of three mountains, that rise southwest of Sankt Andreasberg and east of Sieber in the district of Göttingen in Lower Saxony. The highest of the three peaks is 673 metres high. The other two summits lie roughly 350 metres east and south of the main peak respectively and are ony a few metres lower. The Koboltstaler Köpfe are mainly covered by pine forest and accessible on all sides by forest roads.

To the southwest runs a mountain ridge, the Gödeckenkopf or Gödeckekopf, whose crest lies between 600 and 650 metres high. It is bounded to the west by the Mittleren Gödeckental and to the east by the Kleinen Gödeckental. To the southwest it falls away steeply towards the Großes Gödeckental valley.

== Sources ==
- Topographische Karte 1:25000, No. 4328 Bad Lauterberg im Harz
