= Rodewald =

Village in Lower Saxony, Germany

- Municipality
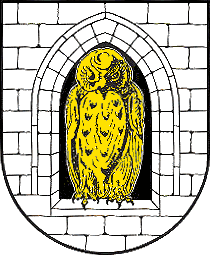
- Coat of arms

- Location of Rodewald within Nienburg/Weser district
- Interactive map of Rodewald
- Location within Germany Location within Lower Saxony
- Coordinates: 52°39′57″N 09°28′56″E
- Country: Germany
- State: Lower Saxony
- District: Nienburg/Weser
- Municipal assoc.: Steimbke

Government
  - Mayor: Katharina Fick

Area
  - Total: 60.31 km^{2} (23.29 sq mi)
- Elevation: 25 m (82 ft)

Population (2025-12-31)
  - Total: 2,574
  - Density: 42.68/km^{2} (110.5/sq mi)
- Time zone: UTC+01:00 (CET)
  - Summer (DST): UTC+02:00 (CEST)
- Postal codes: 31637
- Dialling codes: 05074
- Vehicle registration: NI

Rodewald is an agricultural village in the district of Nienburg in Lower Saxony, Germany, and is locally administrated by Steimbke. At 14 kilometres (8.7 mi) in length, Rodewald is considered the second-longest village in Lower Saxony, and is split into three farming communities (or peasantries) known simply as lower, middle and upper farming community (obere, mittlere and untere Bauerschaft).

It is situated approximately 40 kilometres (25 mi) to the north-northwest of the federal state capital Hanover and 125 kilometres (78 mi) south-southwest of Germany's second largest city Hamburg. Until the administrative and territorial reforms of 1974, Rodewald belonged to the district of Neustadt am Rübenberge.

== History ==
Rodewald is first mentioned in historical records during the initial quarter of the 13th century, after which the Bishop of Minden requested that the Earl of Wölpe establish a settlement. Through a systematic clearing of forests in the northern area, which is identified today as untere Bauernschaft, the village was created and is ultimately where the name stems from; that is, Low German roode (lit. 'to root', or clear) and wald (lit. 'forest', or wood). Each settler received an equal size of land in the Hagenhufendorf format, a typical form of High Middle Ages land ownership.

These pitches of land, no greater than the width of the farmstead, although several hundred metres deep, were between 60 and 70 morgen in size (a morgen being approximately the amount of land tillable by one man behind an ox in the morning hours of a day). This method of land ownership, typical of the High Middle Ages, can still be observed as one passes along the Landesstrasse 192 (Dorfstrasse in the north and Hauptstrasse in the south).

In the course of the centuries the village lengthened considerably with both sides of the L192 becoming populated by the typical Fachhallenhäuser or timber framed farmhouses, found throughout the North German Plain.

Only after the Second World War and with the luxury of the motor car becoming available to the masses did the village begin to see buildings purely used as housing, although in order to ensure a balance between landscape and practicality two new areas in the more densely populated centre and an industrial park at the southern edge were developed. Its original charm has been retained with the open spaces along the street continuing to display the Hagenhufendorf format.

== The First and Second World Wars ==
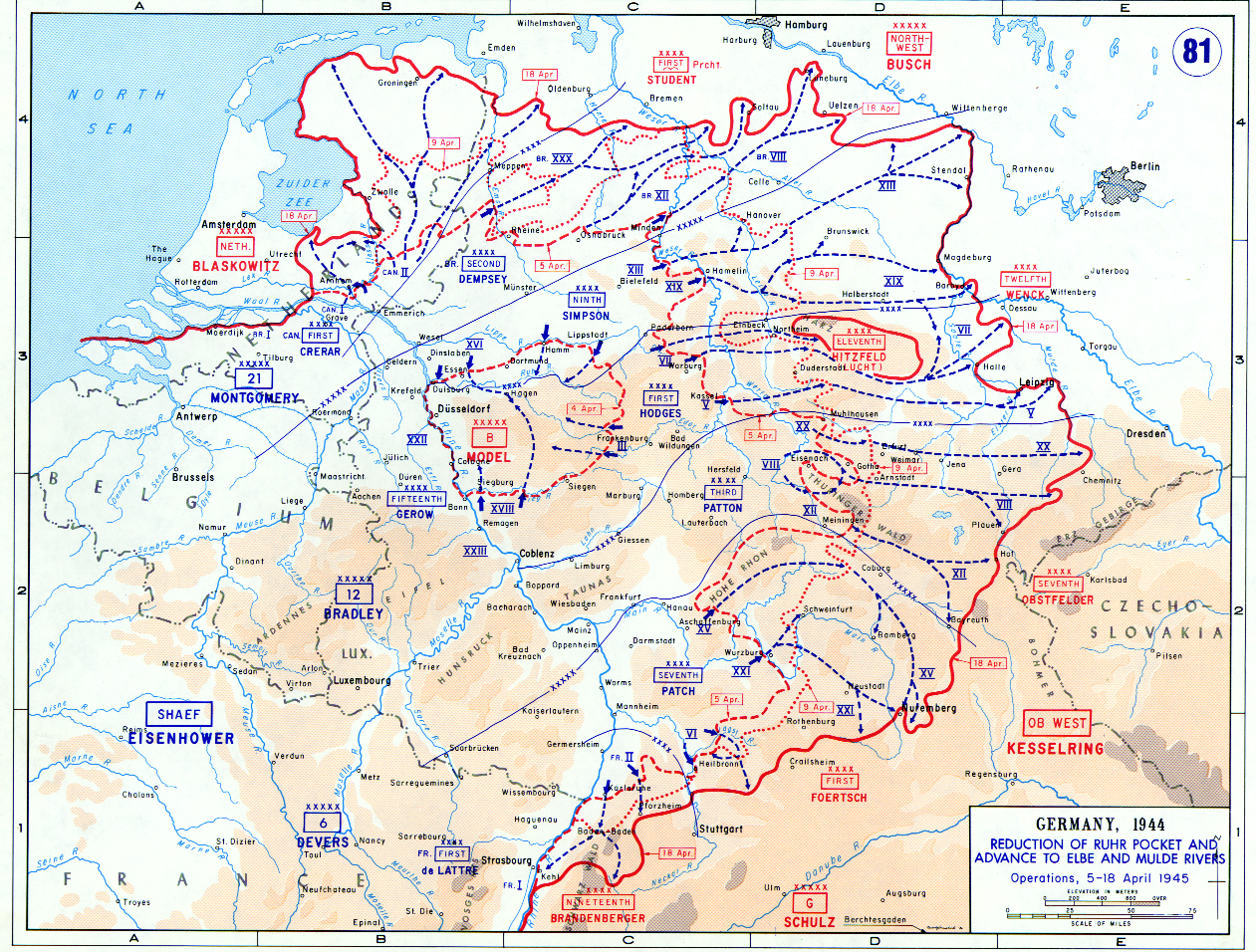
The reduction of the Ruhr Pocket and advance to Elbe and Mulde rivers between 5 and 18 April 1945

=== First World War ===
During the course of the First World War Rodewald lost a number of its inhabitants after they had been drafted to serve in the army, although the area was not occupied after cessation of hostilities.

=== Second World War ===
==== 11th Armoured Division ====
During the dying days of the Second World War, the troops of the British 11th Armoured Division carried on their steady, although strongly contested, advance across the North German Plain. Under the command of Major General George Roberts, it had 53rd (Welsh) Infantry Division to its north (later being replaced by 7th Armoured Division after particularly heavy fighting at Rethem), and 6th Airborne Division to the south. Directly to its front were the troops of SS Panzer Grenadier Ausbildungs und Bataillon 12. HJ, who had been pushed back from Stolzenau during their defence of the Weser, and the sailors of 2nd Marine Infanterie Division that were now forming a defensive line along the Aller. The division formed an essential part of General Montgomery's 21st Army Group during its crossing of the Rhine and the subsequent race to the Baltic.

==== 159th Infantry Brigade ====
Having crossed the River Weser at Petershagen, rather than the intended crossing point at Stolzenau – which was staunchly being defended by SS elements of the Hitler Youth and featured one of the last stands of the Luftwaffe, the British 159th Infantry Brigade's, forming the right hand flank of the divisional thrust, advanced along its axis of Loccum, Rehburg, Eilvese, Hagen, Dudensen, Laderholz and Rodewald. Its two battle groups were formed by combining the 2nd Fife and Forfar Yeomanry with 1st Battalion the Herefordshire Regiment and the 15th/19th The King's Royal Hussars with 1st Battalion the Cheshire Regiment. Each battle group would then take it in turns to head up the advance, where they would be leapfrogged by the other battle group after any major actions, thus allowing the opportunity to establish control and to re-organise should substantial losses be experienced.

With the objective of securing the bridge spanning the Leine river, the British 159th Infantry Brigade fought through the nearby village of Laderholz where they met stiff resistance by soldiers laid at the side of the roads and armed with Panzerfausts. On one occasion a near miss occurred where a Panzerfaust struck, but did little more than damage the vehicle's tool bin (the first three tanks not carrying infantry for obvious reasons). It responded, however, by directing one of its 77 mm charges through the window in which the weapon was fired, killing all the occupants of the room in the process.

The divisional flash of 11th Armoured Division

After quelling the last pockets of resistance in Laderholz, the 2nd Fife and Forfar Yeomanry/1st Battalion the Herefordshire Regiment Battle Group, had the unenviable task on 8 April 1945 of crossing the flat open country which separates the southern tip of Rodewald from Laderholz. The German defenders managed to set up concealed positions in the woods at Wiebusch, along with a road block at the south-west entrance of the village and a brief barrage of artillery and mortars were employed by the British in order to try and flush out the Panzerfaust-wielding infantrymen, before A Squadron of 2nd Fife and Forfar Yeomanry could make their advance in their 35-tonne (77,000 lb) Comet tanks with infantry soldiers of 1st Battalion the Herefordshire Regiment perched perilously on the exterior.

With resistance remaining steady in Wiebusch, a company of the 1st Battalion the Herefordshire Regiment were to head northeast along the region of the River Alpe, where they then turned east towards the centre of the village. It soon became apparent that they would encounter no further resistance as a white flag had been affixed to the church spire of St. Aegidien by Heinrich Kahle and August Deecke, in order to prevent collateral damage occurring to an area of very little strategic or military value.

In the meantime it was decided that C Squadron of 2nd Fife and Forfar Yeomanry and C Company from the 1st Battalion the Herefordshire Regiment, should bypass the delay at Wiebusch and make a cross-country dash from Laderholz to Mandelsloh, in an attempt to secure a crossing of the Leine. On reaching Mandelsloh, it was found that the village was undefended and that bridging at Helstorf was not possible. They then headed north and just before nightfall, had a short sharp battle at Niedernstöcken where 70 prisoners were taken.

By the 9th of April the remaining elements of resistance had been extinguished, or fled during the hours of darkness, and A Squadron of 2nd Fife and Forfar Yeomanry moved west along Niedernstöckener Straße and into Niedernstocken itself where they found the bridge already destroyed.

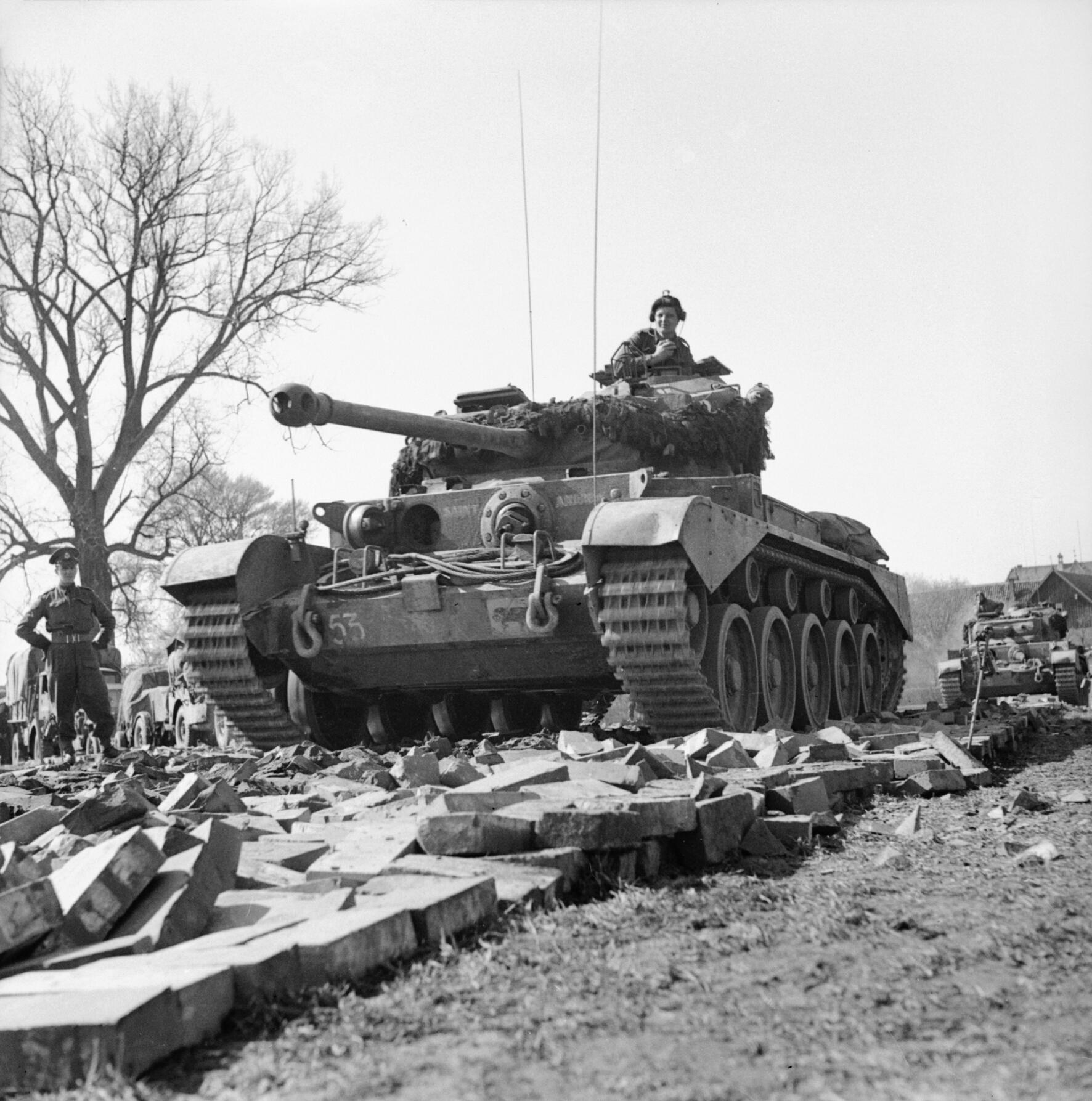
Comet tanks of 15th/19th The King's Royal Hussars, 11th Armoured Division, crossing the Weser at Petershagen, Germany, 7 April 1945

With no viable crossing of the Leine available to 159th Infantry Brigade, its units were forced to head south, where they bridged using 6 Airborne Division's crossing at Neustadt am Rübenberge, before taking up the advance through Esperke, Grindau, Schwarmstedt, crossing the Aller river at Essel and pushing on towards Bergen-Belsen.

==== 29th Armoured Brigade ====
On the 9th of April, and less than 8 kilometres (5.0 mi) to the west, the infantry of the 4th Battalion the King's Shropshire Light Infantry and the 8th Battalion the Rifle Brigade (Prince Consort's Own) were given the task of clearing Steimbke of a Hitler Youth battalion which saw the soldiers of SS-Panzer Grenadier Ausbildung und Ersatz Battalion 12 Hitlerjugend trying to retreat to the relative safety of the wood to the north, which during their withdrawal, they were to endure a heavy mauling where many were cut down by heavy tank fire of 23rd Hussars.

Due to their fanatical resistance, which left the village smouldering and cost some 150 German casualties, it was decided that B Squadron and Recce Troop of the 23rd Hussars, accompanied by F Company of 8th Battalion the Rifle Brigade (Prince Consort's Own)], who were position just south of Steimbke should bypass the capture of the village and advance eastwards along the Bundesstraße 214, through Wendenborstel, Rodewald, Suderbruch, Norddrebber and press on to the bridge at Bothmer in order to secure a crossing point for 29th Armoured Brigade, who were forming the left hand thrust of 11 Armoured Division's advance through Petershagen, Loccum, Rehrburg, Schneeren, Linsburg, Stöckse and Steimbke. On their arrival at Nordrebber, the first vehicle was destroyed by Panzerfaust and heavy fighting ensued with each house having to be systematically cleared. The German troops were described as being 'fresh and full of spirit', as they tried to delay the Allied advance on the river. Unfortunately this resulted in many of the village's farmhouses being reduced to ashes. Having eventually cleared the village, a prompt stab to the northeast proved futile as the bridge was blown up in the advancing troops' faces (the bridge on the westbound exit of the B214 at Schwarmstedt didn't exist at this point).

By the 10th of April, 159th Infantry Brigade had advanced north on the eastern side of the Leine as far as Grindau, which allowed for the unhindered construction of bridges at Helstorf, with 29th Armoured Brigade crossing here on the 11th, before heading to Essel, via Bothmer and Schwarmstedt, which would also be left in a pitiful state after much fighting.

==== Inns of Court Regiment (The Devil's Own) ====
Employed as the Division's reconnaissance unit, the Inns of Court Regiment were used to liaise with 53rd (Welsh) Infantry Division to the north, provide flank protection, sniff out potential bridging points and areas of high interest, such as V2 components around the Nienburg area and an alleged PoW camp to the north of Steimbke. Having dispelled these rumours, they then entered the north of Rodewald at Neudorf, having arrived from Lichtenhorst, before pushing on without resistance to Gilten.

==== 2. Marine Infanterie Division ====
A remaining one-man bunker standing adjacent to a disused hunter's cabin in the woods around Paschenburg

The soldiers of 2. Marine Infanterie Division, commanded by Vizeadmiral Schleuren, had the unenviable title of being the last bastion of formal resistance by a coherent German formation to fight against the British Army. Its ranks consisted of Kriegsmarine, Volksgrenadier and Hitlerjugend, who although lacking in tactics and experience, fought bravely and tenaciously, even though the war's outcome was already obvious. With very few natural obstacles to assist in defence, the division would fall back to the region's three major rivers, where a major stand would be made until the position became unsustainable and the defending troops would withdraw during the hours of darkness in order to avoid being strafed by Allied aircraft.

==== Collateral Damage, Civilian Casualties and Refugees ====
Although Rodewald remained largely unscathed during both the ground advances and the bombing raids of the Second World War, there are still splash marks to be found on some of the southwesterly facing walls of the buildings around the area of Krummende and shell holes are clearly visible in the woods at Wiebusch. Whether any of the houses were destroyed during the fighting is unclear, but it is fair to assume that the village was only defended at its entrance from Laderholz.

==== Aircraft Losses ====
During the Second World War, Rodewald was never a deliberate target of Bomber Command, however, a number of losses were experienced by both the Allied and Axis powers. On 10 February 1944, a Bf 109G-6 piloted by Unteroffizier Alfred Arndt of V.Jagdgeschwader 11, crashed in the region of Rodewald's Haidmühle. Although never officially identified and the grounds for the aircraft's loss never established, he was laid to rest in Rodewald's cemetery.

Then on 8 March 1944, Leutnant Wolfgang Kiesel of I.Jagdgeschwader 11, died at the age of 24 when his Fw 190A-7 / R4 crashed in unknown circumstances near Wendenborstel.

Another member of V.Jagdgeschwader 11 died on 4 April 1944, the unknown aircraft being piloted by the 23-year-old Unteroffizier Paul Tröndle, forming a part of the Reichsverteidigung. The grounds for his death are not clear and although he crashed in Rodewald, he was later buried at Wunstorf's cemetery.

On 8 March 1944, an American B-17 named Sleepy Time Gal, was flying a bombing mission from RAF Deopham Green, Norfolk to Berlin as part of the 452nd Bomb Group, 731st Bombardment Squadron, when it was intercepted over Hanover by ten to fifteen Fw 190s, Bf 109s and Bf 110s. Initially mistaking the distant aircraft for Allied escorts, the B-17 Flying Fortress was soon peppered by cannon fire, resulting in the loss of two of the four engines. Having ensured that his crew bailed out successfully, including the freeing of a trapped gunner, and giving away his own parachute without hesitation, the pilot, 2nd Lieutenant Theodore H MacDonald, managed to crash land the aircraft in the region of Lichtenmoor, with eight of the crew being taken as prisoners of war and two later succumbing to their injuries.

The final loss in this area was again at Lichtenmoor when a Halifax VII bomber named Canada Kid of 432 Squadron, Royal Canadian Air Force, crashed on a bombing run from RAF East Moor to Hanover on 5 January 1945, 300 metres (980 ft) to the east of the road which links Steimbke and Lichtenhorst. The aircraft had just turned on the last leg of the course, south of Bremen, when a German night fighter attacked. One of the wings caught fire and the flames spread rapidly. The 27-year-old pilot, Flight Lieutenant JE Sales, was killed as a result, along with another member of the crew. They were later buried at the Hanover War Cemetery and the surviving five were held as prisoners of war.

== Coat of arms ==
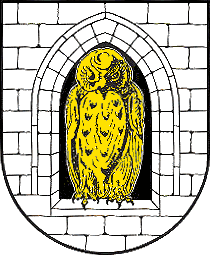
Rodewald's Coat of Arms

The coat of arms consists of an owl perched on a clerestory window aperture, surrounded by stone. The motive of the owl originates from a small stone owl which can be found in the spire Rodewald's main church, St Aegidien.

It was approved in 1960 as a symbol of the Mittlere Bauernschaft parish by the regional president of Hanover and in 1969 adopted to represent the village as a whole.

== Transportation ==
=== Road ===
The village's inhabitants are served by two major roads, these being the Bundesstraße 214, running east–west from Celle to Nienburg and the Landesstraße 192, which runs north–south from Lichtenhorst to Neustadt am Rübenberge. Both are cyclist friendly and have designated cycle paths encompassing a system where motor vehicles are obliged to give way. The roads themselves are in relatively good condition, which is not necessarily the case for many of the other surrounding villages whose roads have been badly damaged by a number severe winters and remain in a poor condition due to a lack of investment – often the only viable solution being a speed reduction from 50 to 30 kilometres per hour (31 to 19 mph). To the east and south are two major motorways, the Autobahn 7 and Autobahn 2 respectively.

=== Train and Bus ===
Public transport is somewhat awkward should one intend to visit any of the local cities or towns, except Nienburg where a bus service is in place. This is due to the bus service being restricted to within the confines of the district of Nienburg, serving mainly school children, students and adults without the luxury of a privately owned vehicle. The nearest train station (and taxi service) is located 10 kilometres (6.2 mi) to the east at the town of Schwarmstedt, but due to it forming part of the district of Soltau-Fallingbostel cannot be reached by public transport. Most of those who have access to a privately owned vehicle and intend to travel into Hanover, but aim to avoid congestion, tend to drive the 25 kilometres (16 mi) south east to Bennemühlen, a town at the regional extremities of Hanover where lower train fares can be obtained. Another option is to use the Hanover bus service from Ladeholz or Niedernstöcken, which is again inconvenient for those without access to a motor vehicle.

=== Air ===
Hanover International Airport is situated to the north of the city in an area known as Langenhagen and is located besides the Autobahn 352. Consisting of three terminals and at an approximate distance of 50 kilometres (31 mi) by road, the airport is efficient not overwhelming, yet offers a good selection of destinations.

== Sports, Leisure and Culture ==
=== Clubs ===
The village has an entwining sense of community spirit with most inhabitants either actively or indirectly supporting one of the many clubs in operation. At around 30 in strength, the main ones include:

==== SSV Rodewald ====
The Sports and Games Club dating back to 1921 which aside fielding three football teams at district level also offers the opportunity to participate at handball, gymnastics, athletics, table tennis, Nordic walking and hiking. The Club boasts a sports hall, training football pitch and club house, and a match football pitch with a club house offering spectators food and drink.

==== Schützenverein ====
Literally meaning Marksmen Club, there are three Schützenvereinen within the village, one per Bauernschaft, with the members wearing a very distinctive and traditional uniform linking back to their days as a local militia. Those participating apply marksmanship principles, without attaching any military importance and compete in a purely sporting manner. The Clubs have their own Schützenhaus and hold an annual internal competition with the winner of the men's, women's and children's events being crowned during a large celebration known as Schützenfest. The weapons used tend to range from air-rifles to small bore weapons and crossbows.

==== Theaterverein Preciosa ====
An amateur dramatics club provides entertainment in the form of short plays and pantomimes, often performing at Gasthaus Ernst Höper on Krummende. One of their specialities is the use of Plattdeutsch during some presentations in an attempt to revive a local language which has been in decline since the 18th century.

==== Reit und Fahrverein ====
Also founded in 1921, the Riding and Carriage Club thrived until the Second World War when all but the most essential horses were commandeered for the war effort. Post war the Club again began to flourish and exists to this day. The riding hall is used for various activities including lessons in dressage, show jumping and horseback gymnastics.

==== Freiwillige Feuerwehr ====
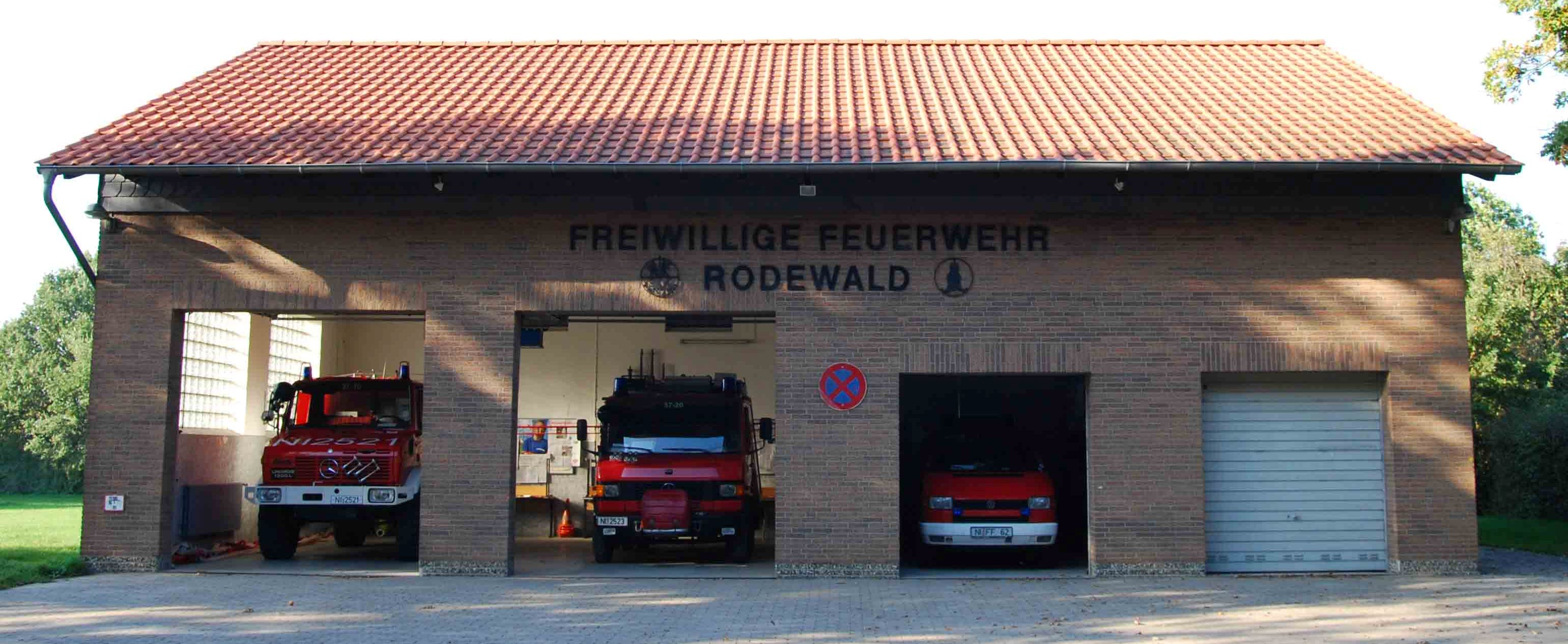
Rodewald's Fire Station

Although more a form of public service than a club, Rodewald has a volunteer fire brigade consisting of three active groups (one per Bauernshaft), a senior members association and a youth organisation. All active members must have attended a form of basic training and continue to develop their skills during scheduled monthly meetings where continuance training is delivered or equipment and hydrants are tested and maintained. Regional courses are also available in group leadership, the use of breathing apparatus, vehicle maintenance and radio operation.

During an emergency the alarm is raised by the use of numerous civil defence sirens signalling that all active members within the vicinity are to make their way to the centrally located fire station and man the two fire engines and minibus where needed. As all local villages are interlinked and retain their own volunteer fire brigade, a sizable response can therefore be guaranteed when the situation requires it.

In the near future it is envisaged that a larger fire engine will replace one of the existing vehicles, which will also involve much structural adaptation to the station itself.

=== Recreation ===
==== Freibad ====
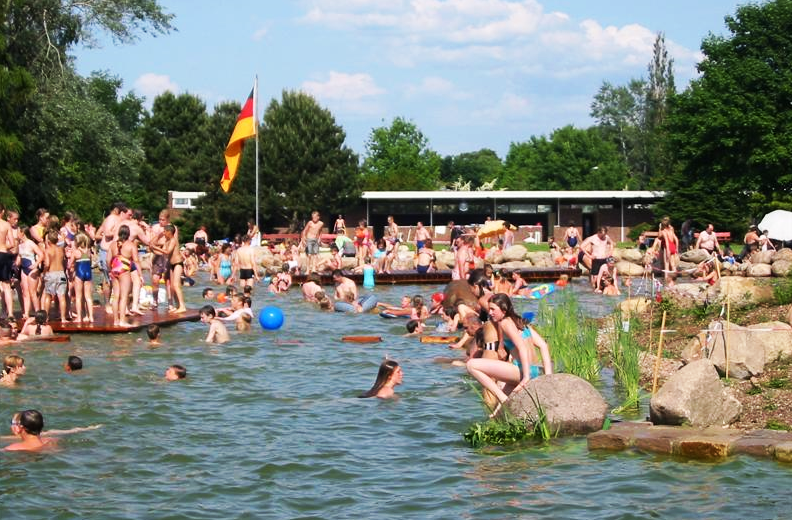
Rodewald's open-air naturally filtered pool in high summer.

The centrally located outdoor swimming pool is open during the weekends of summer months. It is considered eco-friendly due to the utilisation of aquatic plants and haydite, a rock to which friendly bacteria attach, acting as biological cleansers. Its own waterfall, aside providing a base for those who wish to jump into the water from a height, oxygenates the pool and acts as a return. A kiosk offers all the delights of a typical German snack bar or Schnellimbis and there are also ample other features available such as; water slides, pontoons, dedicated sun bathing area, ball games and changing facilities.

=== Festivals ===
Throughout the year there a plethora of festivals which take place of varying scales and themes. The most notable being:

==== Osterfeuer ====
The Osterfeuer, or Easter Fire, is celebrated on the Holy Saturday in the 'obere Bauernschaft' and on Easter Sunday at the Fire Station, during the hours of nightfall. Orchestrated by the local fire brigade, a large collection of small branches and twigs are heaped up on the grassed area close to the station. This allows the local inhabitants to rid their gardens of the year's tree and hedge cuttings.

It is a family event with food and drink being available, as well as a time for the local children to meet up and play.

==== Schützenfest in Wiebusch ====
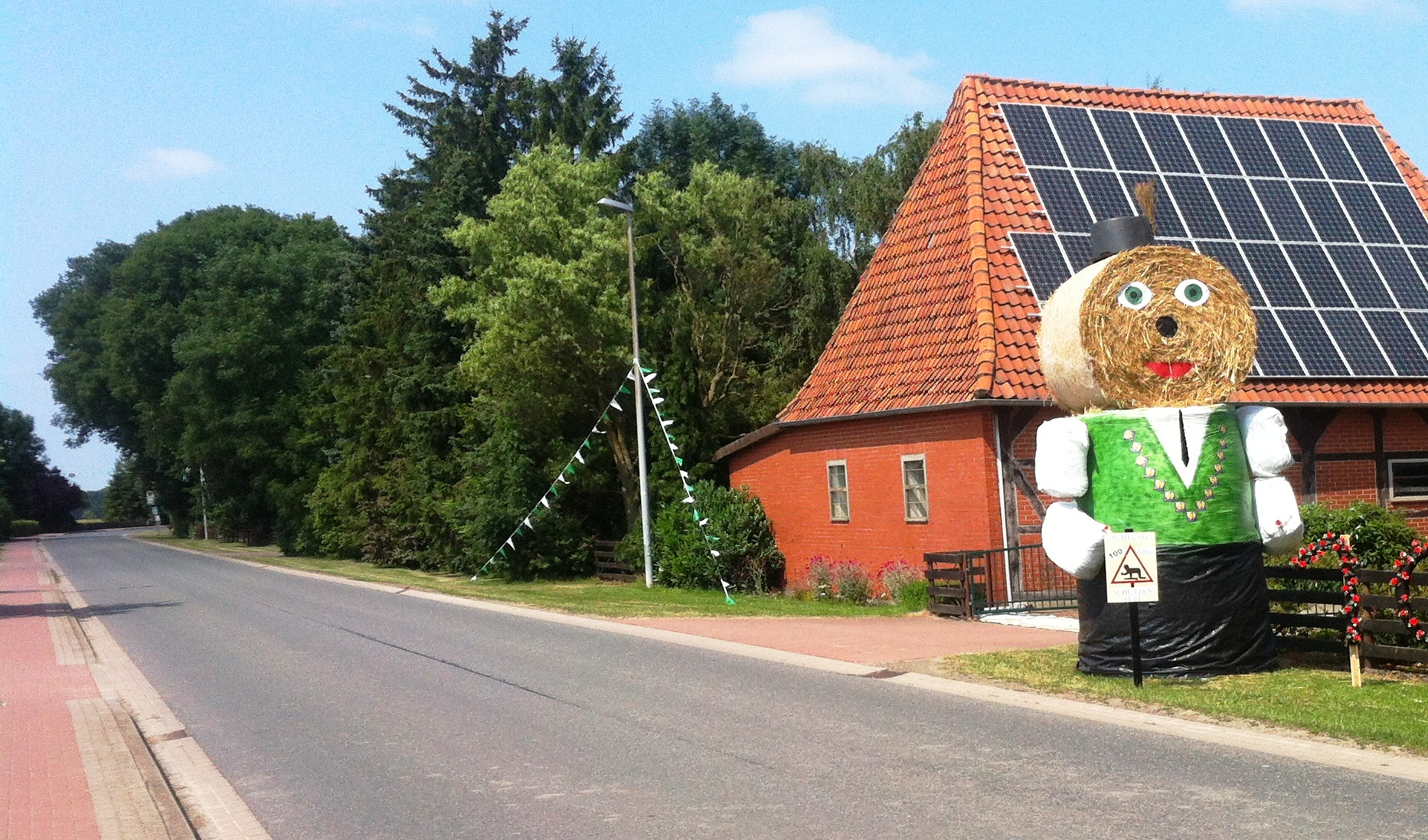
A typical example of the street decorations during Schutzenfest.

Schützenfest is normally a weekend affair which takes place during the weekend following Pfingsten or Pentecost as it is known in English. A marching band usually parades along the main road where they halt at each individual winner's house where various festivities steeped in tradition take place (see above for details). The event's crescendo later takes place in Wiebusch where traditional music is played, along with food and drink being served.

==== Jahrmarkt in Marktplatz ====
Translating as yearly market, Jahrmarkt is one of Rodewald's biggest events. Developing as a village fair where livestock and foodstuffs such as honey, saffron and pepper could be traded, it later became a place where people would ride carousels, enjoy multi-national fast food, play fairground games for prizes, listen to live music, dance and frequent many of the temporary bars which form part of the circuit. Taking place during the third weekend of September, the gathering still retains its nickname of Heiratsmarkt or marriage market due to the amount of local folk who met there and later set up in holy matrimony.

==== Erntefest in Wiebusch ====
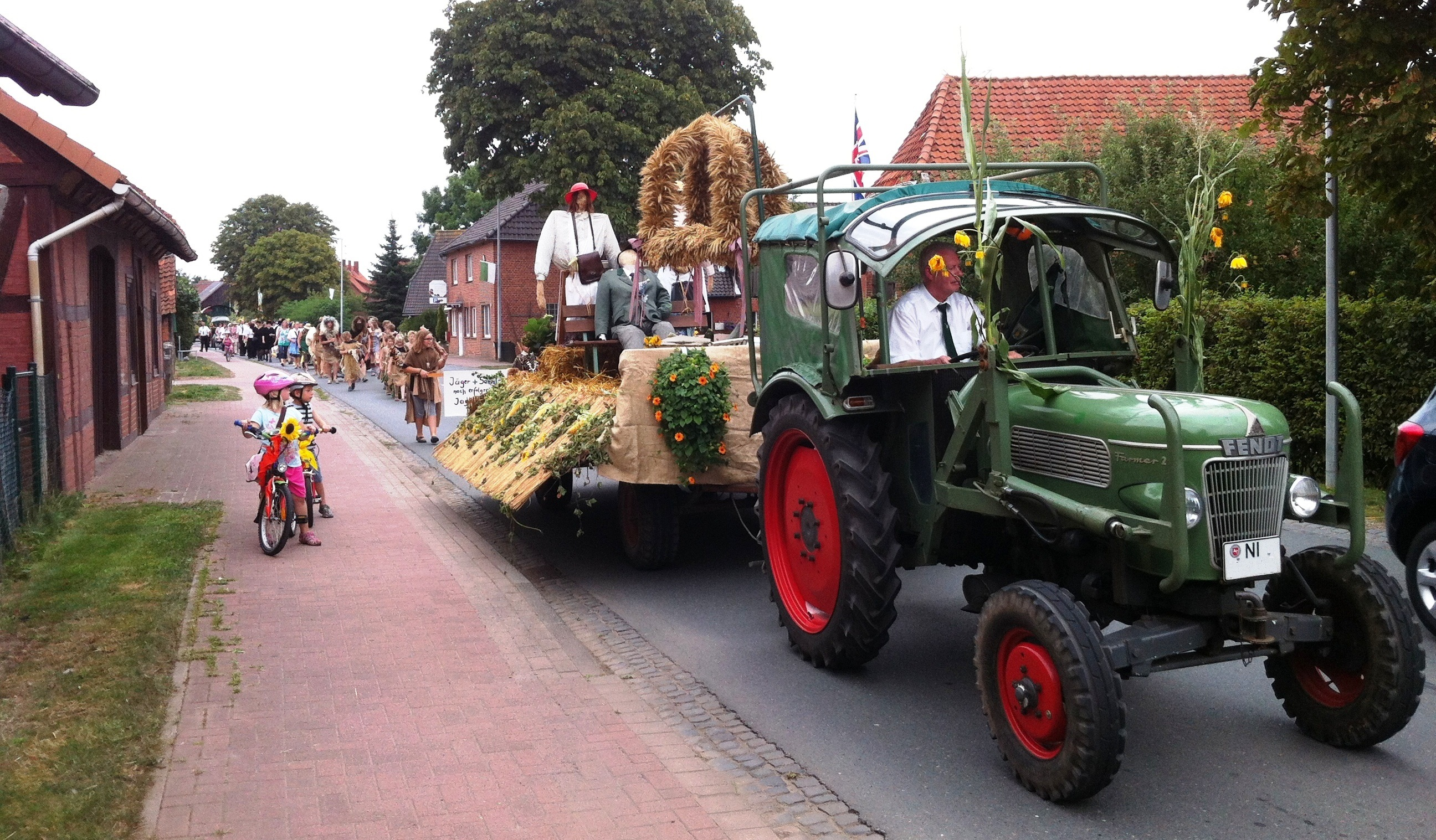
The Erntefest procession.

Traditionally a time for local farmers to celebrate the Ernte or harvest, this three-day event is staged during the first weekend of September and involves a large tent being set up in the wooded area of Wiebusch to the south of the village. Organised by the Schützenverein, a procession consisting of various floats, tractors and trailers decorated in harvested crops, a marching band in yearly alternating fancy dress outfits and members of the Schützenverien itself, march on Saturday afternoon from Marktplaz, at the centre of the village, to Wiebusch, where they are readily replenished with liquid refreshments by spectators along the route. Local food and drink can be enjoyed whilst listening to live music, where many villagers practice the Disco-Fox style of dancing.

== Local Wildlife ==
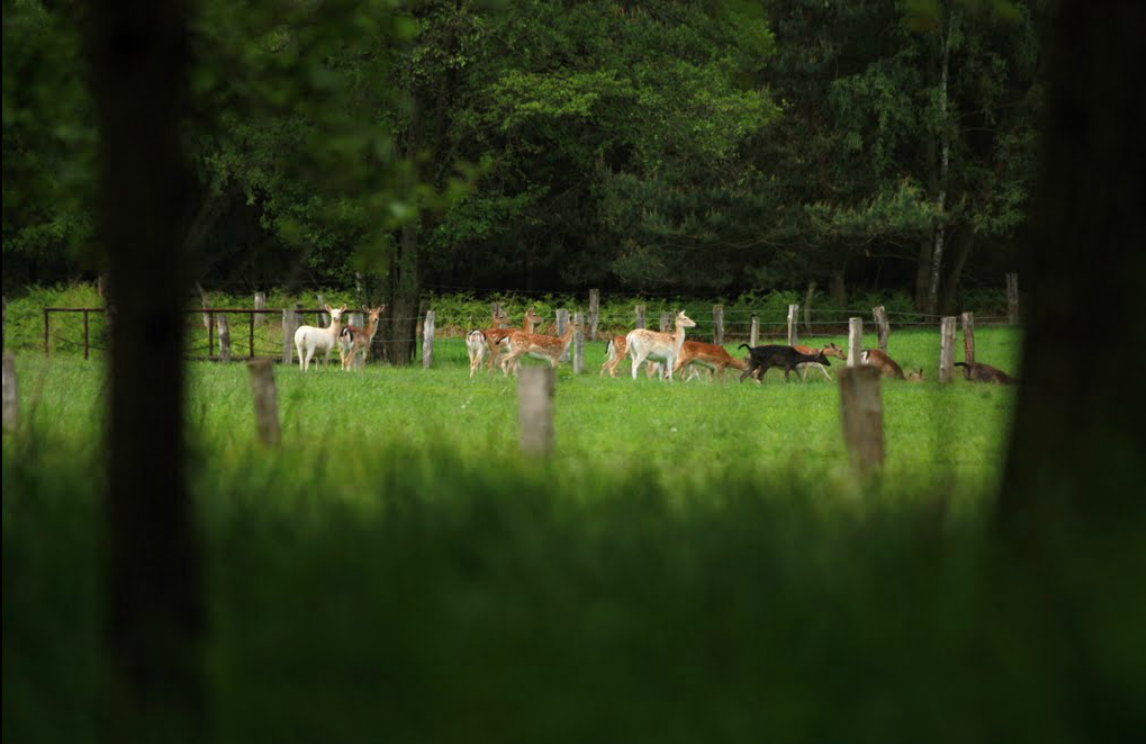
A herd of roe deer seen grazing on agricultural land

The surrounding area is awash with local wildlife which tends to live within the three main types of habitat available; agricultural fields, wooded areas of mixed deciduous and coniferous content, and moorland.

In the open areas can be seen many birds of prey such as the common buzzard, kestrel, sparrow hawk and during warmer months, the red kite. Mammals which are easy to spot include; wild boar, red fox, feral cat, hare, roe deer and the slightly larger fallow deer, which tend to be more suited to the marshier areas to the north.

Along Rodewald's stream, known as the Alpe, water birds can be commonly seen in and around the flooded fields such as the stork, heron, great egret and kingfisher.

Hunting is common within the area with numerous elevated hides of a fixed nature being scattered around tree lines. Aside providing game meat, it also helps control the deer and wild boar populations which destroy crops, resulting in farmers viewing them as pests.

During the fawning period of 1 April and 15 July, dogs are not allowed off their leash in open countryside with the animal liable to be shot if seen harassing game or livestock.

Deer and wild boar prove a real risk to motorists with collisions taking place regularly. In an effort to remind motorist of the danger, pink crosses are placed on the spot of any recent accidents.

=== The Strangler of Lichtenmoor ===
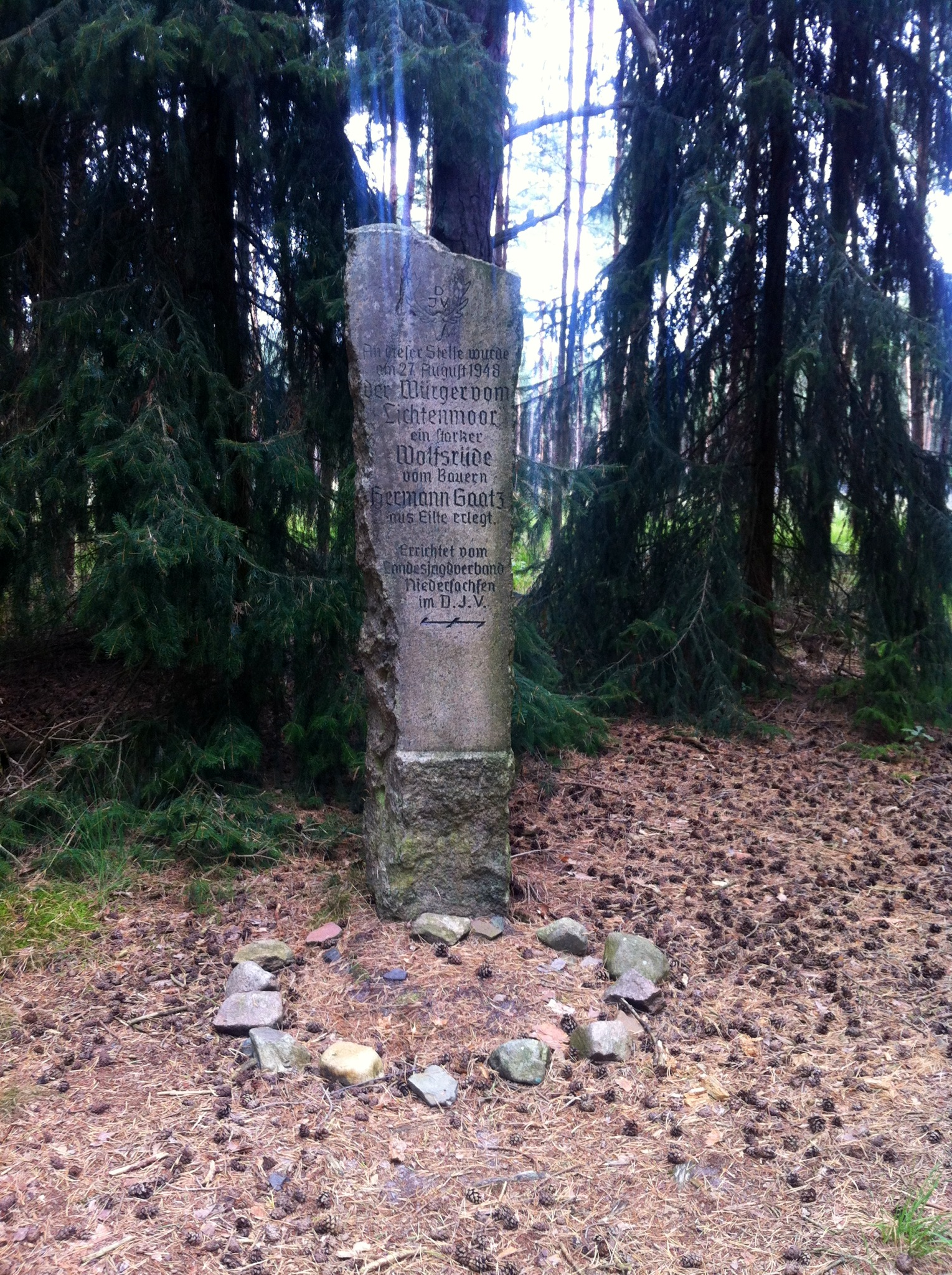
On this spot on 27 August 1948, The Strangler of Lichtenmoor, a powerfully built male wolf, was shot by farmer Hermann Gaatz of Eilte

The last wolf in the area was destroyed by a 61 years of age farmer named Hermann Gaatz on 27 August 1948 around the Schotenheide area between Eilte and Rodewald. It followed what had become a period of local hysteria known as Strangler of Lichtenmoor, after a number of domestic pets, cattle, sheep and wildlife had been found mutilated injuries tended to be unusually clean cuts and around the hind right quarters, which suggested a human with a knife rather than those inflicted by a predatory animal). A stone was positioned on the very spot where the animal fell, which had been found to be a 6-year-old male weighing 43 kilograms (95 lb), with a shoulder height of 85 centimetres (33 in) and length of 170 centimetres (67 in), who last seen stalking deer.

The claim of shooting the last wolf in the area proved short lived as in 1955 a conservationist called William Scharff shot what was in fact to be the very last one. Although no others have been seen to date, it has been suggested that the wolves are slowly returning from the east and Poland.

== See also ==
- War diaries and maps
