= Giebichenstein boulder =

Erratic boulder in northern Germany

Coordinates: 52°37′59″N 9°18′53″E

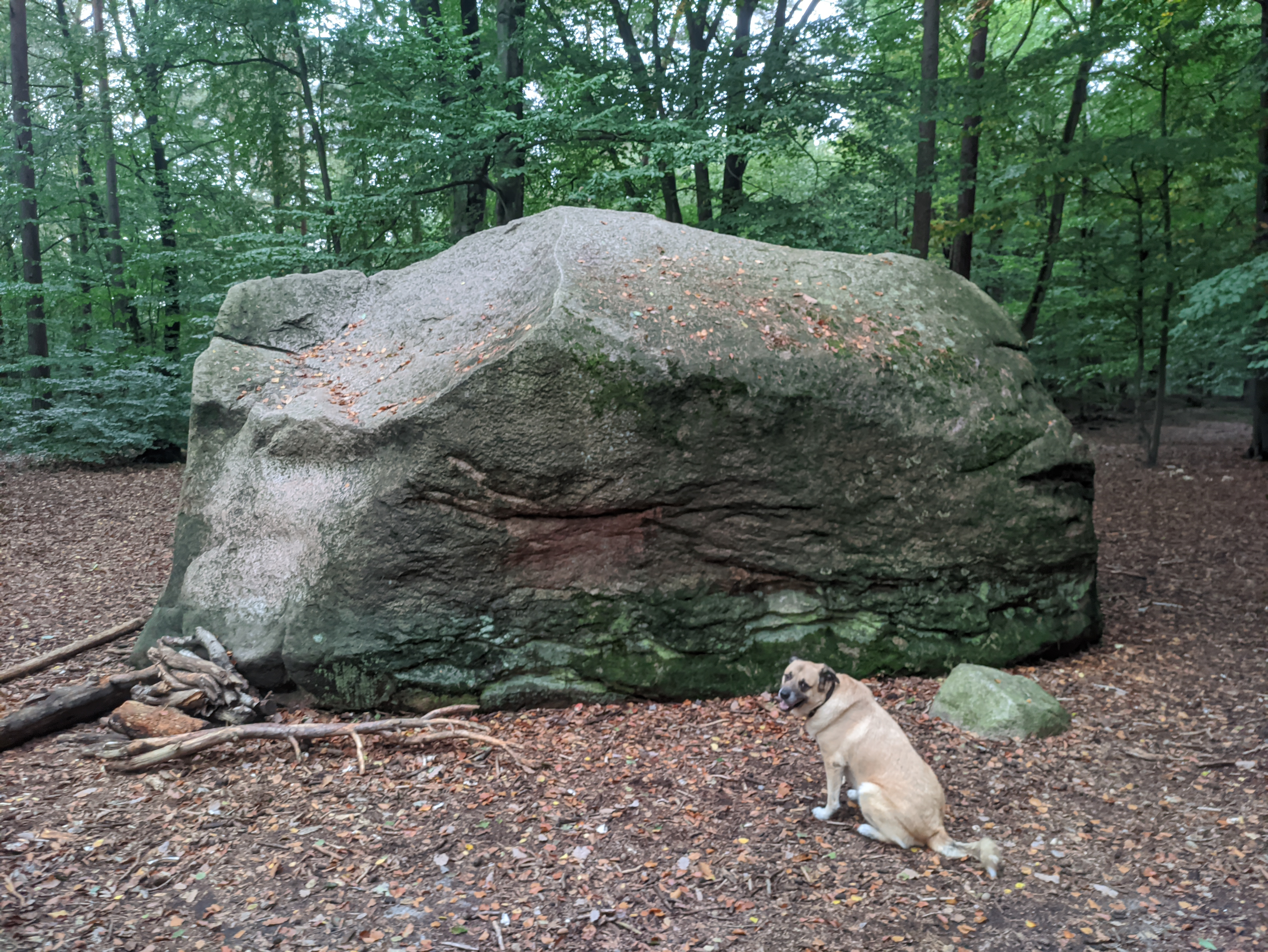
The "Giebichenstein" near Stöckse, Germany

The Giebichenstein near Stöckse, Germany, in the district of Nienburg, Lower Saxony, is one of the largest erratic boulders of northern Germany. It weighs around 207 tonnes (460 thousand pounds). A picture of the Giebichenstein is part of the emblem of the Stöckse municipality.

There is the supposition that during Wolstonian Stage the stone was deposited by glaciers as a part of a moraine. Near the Giebichenstein there are the remains of a dolmen, and at the stone itself there were found the remains of a Stone Age hunter's camp.

== See also ==
- List of individual rocks
