= Scharzfels Castle =

Castle ruins in Scharzfeld, Germany

Coordinates: 51°37′44.50″N 10°24′32.00″E

Scharzfels Castle (German: Burgruine Scharzfels) is the medieval ruin of a fortification located east of the village of Scharzfeld in the borough of Herzberg am Harz in central Germany. It lies in a wood on a ridge about 150 m above the Oder valley. For centuries after its construction in the 10th or 11th century it remained an impregnable fortress. The inner ward is built on a dolomite rock outcrop about 20 m high. The castle was first captured after a siege in 1761 during the Seven Years' War and then blown up.

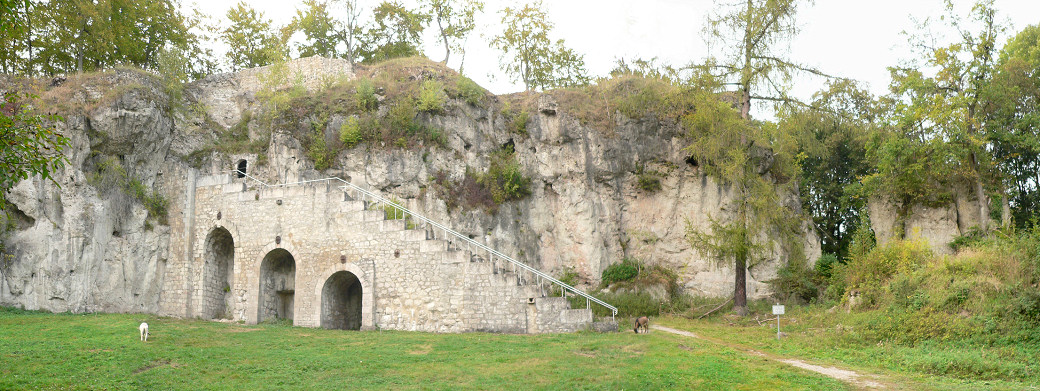
The upper ward on a dolomite rock outcrop and its access stairway

== Construction ==
Of the fortifications of the former outer ward nothing visible remains apart from a well house. The lower or outer ward is now a flat terraced area with a tourist restaurant. From the outer ward a stairway, built in the 19th century, leads to the upper ward on the 20-metre-high dolomite rock. The rock has an area of about 20 metres × 60 metres. This eyrie-like position with its vertical rock faces made the castle impregnable. The stone castle buildings were built on top of the rock or in gaps. According to contemporary accounts, there was at least a palas and a tower. Of the buildings and the defensive wall only preserved fragments remain that have now been restored. In contrast, the tunnels and rooms hewn out of the rock still exist, including the 15-metre-long corridor that runs from the castle entranceway.

Several hundred metres away from the castle ruins is the rock known as the Frauenstein, which was once an observation tower and an outwork.

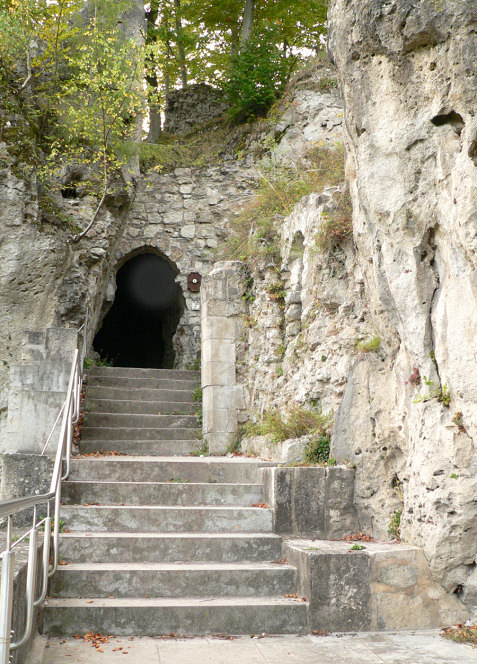
Castle entrance at the top of the stairway at a height of around 20 metres

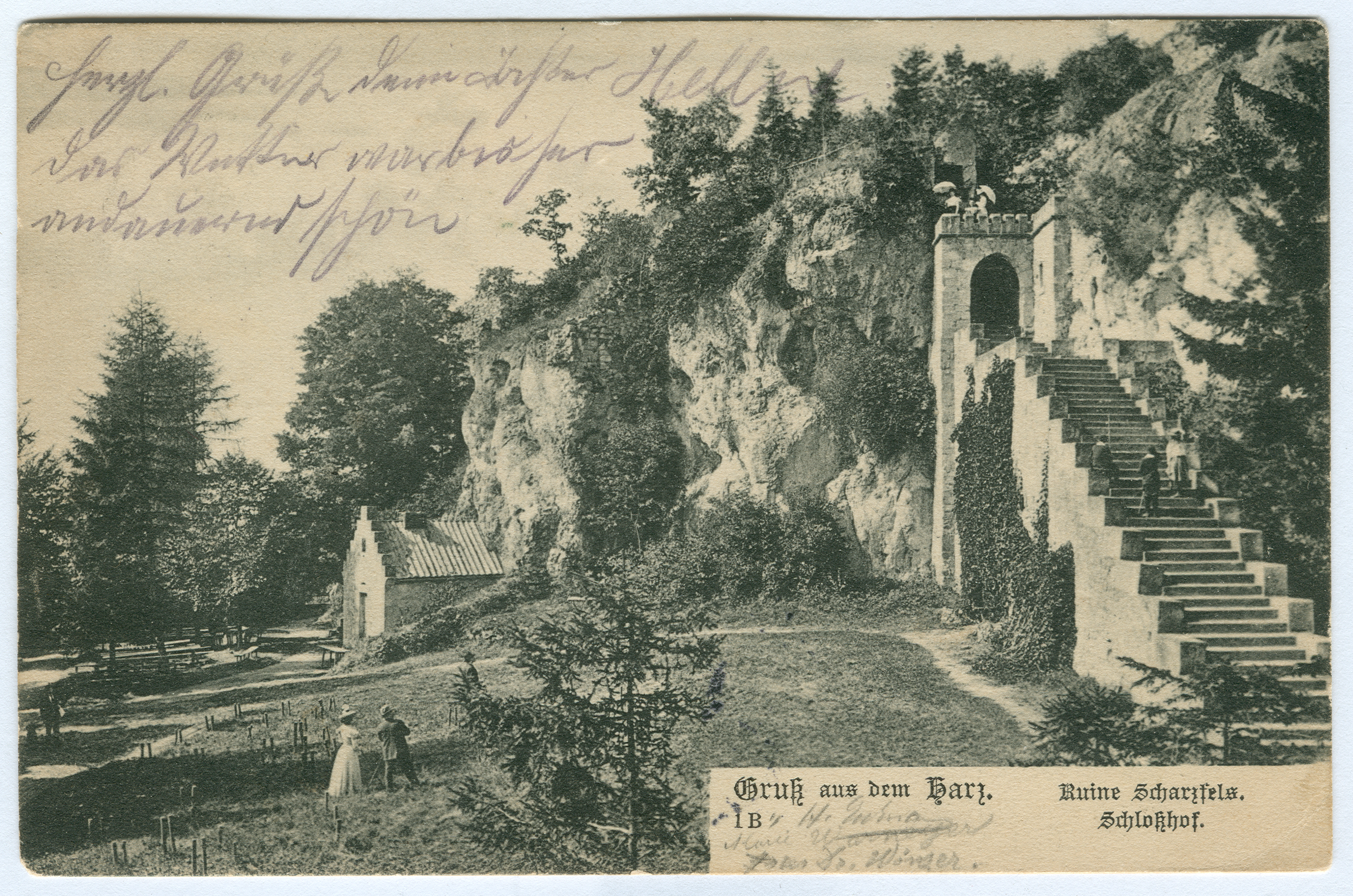
Ca. 1900: Around the castle gate; postcard by Karl Friedrich Wunder

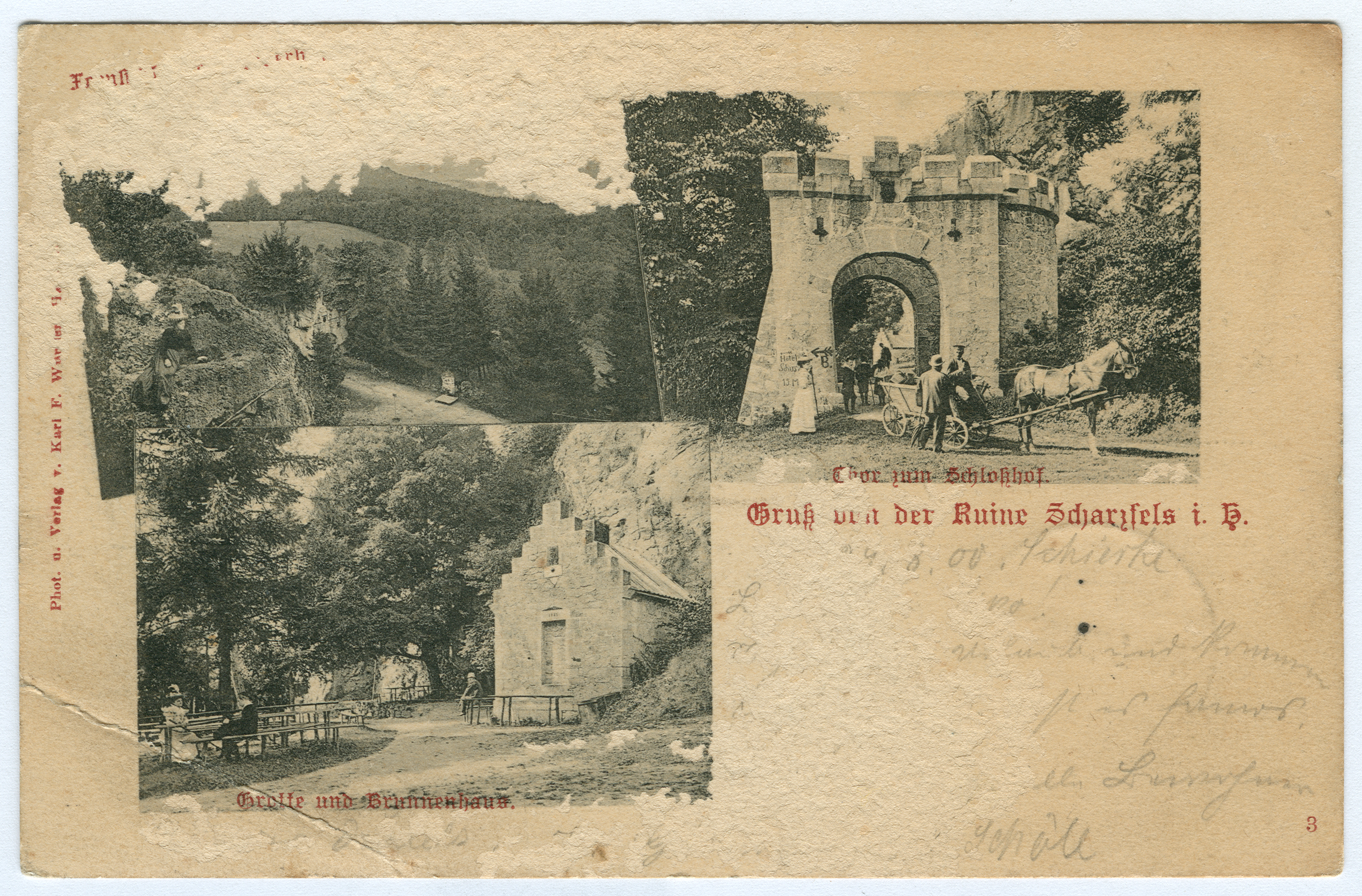
Postcard with views of the castle ruins

== History ==
=== Emergence in the Middle Ages ===
The castle of Scharzfels was probably built in the 10th or 11th century and belonged in its early days to the Magdeburg archdiocese. It only became of historical significance through Emperor Lothair of Süpplingenburg who acquired it in 1131 and turned it into an imperial fort (reichsfeste). This purchase is witnessed by the same document in which the castle is mentioned in writing for the first time, as Castrum quoddam Scartuelt. From that time the castle was home to several lines of counts, including the counts of Scharzfeld who were named after the castle. After they had become extinct, the castle went in 1300 as a fief of the Principality of Grubenhagen into the possession of the counts of Hohnstein. After the extinction of the Harz-based line of the House of Hohnstein in 1593, the feudal castle and house returned to the House of Grubenhagen. In 1596 Duke Henry Julius of Brunswick-Wolfenbüttel inherited the fortress. Later it passed into the possession of the Hanover line of the House of Welf.

=== Fortress and gaol ===
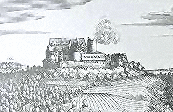
1654 Merian copperplate of the castle

In 1627 the castle was expanded, occupied by a garrison and heavily fortified. In the centuries after the construction of the castle no enemy power was able to capture it, despite conflicts such as the Peasants' War and the Thirty Years' War. In the 17th century Scharzfels became a state gaol. From 1695 Eleonore of the Knesebeck (born 1655) resided here, who came from a prestigious ancient Lüneburg family, albeit of the lesser nobility. She became the maid to Princess Sophia of Ahlden after Sophia's marriage in 1682. Between the vulnerable sixteen-year-old, Sophie Dorothea, who had married into the House Hanover, and Eleanor a friendly relationship developed, a sort of mother-daughter relationship, and she was a confidante in the extra-marital love affair of her mistress with the reckless Count of Königsmarck, serving as a letter bearer. The family of Eleanor of the Knesebeck tried again and again to initiate a legal process and sought in vain for a bail of 100,000 talers. The prisoner remained incarcerated in a tiny room, only being allowed to see an old nurse once a day. Her family eventually bribed the roofer, Veit Rentsch. As a result, Eleanor was freed in 1697 with outside help in a daring rescue action, being lowered about 20 metres down from the high castle rock, her body being tied to the body of her rescuer, who abseiled with her. Previously, he had made an opening in the roof of the room where the prisoner was held and hauled her out with a rope. Below, her brother waited with a handful of mounted men and carried them to safety. She traveled to Vienna, where she managed secure an imperial letter of protection and drove to Brunswick. In 1717 she died in a village near this city. From the family of her former mistress, she received 2,000 talers in support.

=== Capture ===
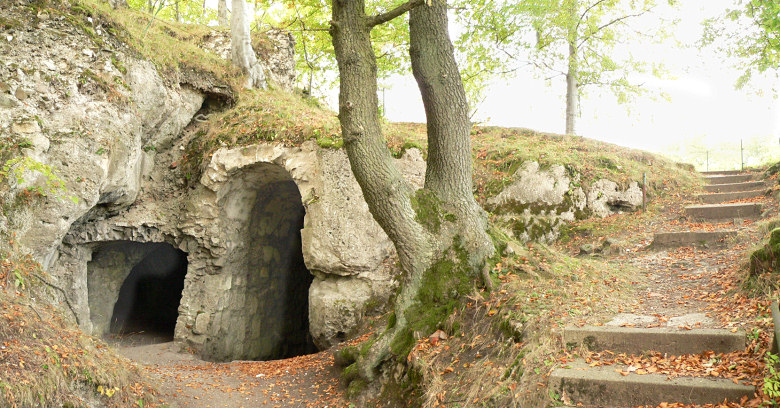
Rock tunnels on the upper ward

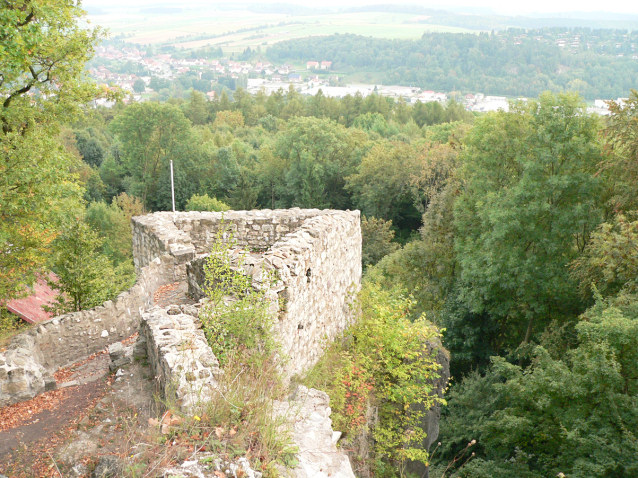
View over the defensive wall to Barbis

In 1761, during the Seven Years' War, a body of French troops, numbering some 6,000 men, appeared in front of Scharzfels Castle. They succeeded in forcing the surrender of the castle which had been defended by 40 gunners, 100 infantry from the Harz and 250 invalids from Hanover. When the defenders refused to give up voluntarily, the French attacked the castle with an assault and bombardment, but met with no success. As the result of a tip-off about a hidden path to the Liethberg a hill in the vicinity, the French were able to destroy the outwork at Frauenstein by shelling and then bombard the castle. After a ten-day siege, the garrison surrendered the castle on 25 September 1761. The capture of this hitherto impregnable fortress caused great jubilation in Paris. Their joy was dampened somewhat when it became known that the defenders were largely invalids. After only four days' occupation the French blew up the castle and withdrew when it became known that Prince Ferdinand of Brunswick was advancing on Scharzfels. Since that time, the castle site has lain in ruins.

== Walking and climbing ==
Scharzfels Castle is no. 151 in the system of checkpoints in the Harzer Wandernadel hiking network; it lies on the Karst Trail and Harzer Baudensteig trail. The north face of the dolomite rock is used for climbing.

== Sources ==
- Friedrich, Ernst Andreas (1992). Wenn Steine reden könnten. Band II, Landbuch-Verlag, Hanover, ISBN 3-7842-0479-1
- Nück, Wolfgang-Dietrich (2008). Graf Sigebodo II. von Scharzfeld/Lauterberg, Verlag für Regionalgeschichte, Bielefeld, ISBN 978-3-89534-692-7
- Vladi, Firouz (1990). Die Burg Scharzfels, Verlag Jungfer, Herzberg, no ISBN
