= Oettern-Bremke =

- Ortsteil of Detmold
- Position of Oettern-Bremke within Detmold
- Interactive map of Oettern-Bremke
- Location within Germany Location within North Rhine-Westphalia
- Coordinates: 51°58′2″N 8°52′15″E
- Country: Germany
- State: North Rhine-Westphalia
- District: Lippe
- Town: Detmold

Area
  - Total: 3.25 km^{2} (1.25 sq mi)
- Elevation: 171 m (561 ft)

Population (2006)
  - Total: 153
  - Density: 47.1/km^{2} (122/sq mi)
- Time zone: UTC+01:00 (CET)
  - Summer (DST): UTC+02:00 (CEST)
- Postal codes: 32758
- Dialling codes: 05231

Oettern-Bremke is a village in the borough of Detmold in the district of Lippe in the German federal state of North Rhine-Westphalia and lies about 5 km north of the town centre. The neighbouring Detmold villages are, in a clockwise direction, Bentrup, Loßbruch, Klüt, Jerxen-Orbke and Niewald. Oettern-Bremke was probably in the 13th century, like the neighbouring villages of Nienhagen and Niewald, founded as a Hagenhufendorf. The name Oettern comes from otters, that presumably lived in the nearby stream of the same name: Oetternbach. Bremke was mentioned as Bredenbeke in old documents dated 1322 and 1507. Formerly an independent municipality, it is part of the town Detmold since 1970.

Around 153 villagers live in Oettern-Bremke on an area of 3.2 km^{2} (as of August 2006). The current village chairman is Bernd Moritz (SPD), the representative in the Detmold town council is Wolfgang Köster (SPD).
