= Tiefenbeek =

River in Germany

Location
- Country: Germany
- State: Lower Saxony

Physical characteristics
- Mouth
  - location: Sieber
  - coordinates: 51°41′38″N 10°25′02″E

Basin features
- Progression: Sieber→ Oder→ Rhume→ Leine→ Aller→ Weser→ North Sea

Tiefenbeek (also Breitentalbach) is a small river of Lower Saxony, Germany. It flows into the Sieber in the village Sieber.

The Tiefenbeek features a hiking path connecting Sieber to Bad Lauterberg, leading past the Grosser Knollen mountain.

The Tiefenbeek is an almost 3 km long tributary of the Sieber river. It originates at 600 m elevation at the Aschentalshalbe mountain range. From its origin, the rivulet heads northwest and west, then turns southwest, where it is separated from the Sieber river by the Breitentalskopf mountain.It then turns northnorthwest and merges at a height of 320 m into the Sieber. The name Tiefenbeek stems from the depth (German tief) of the valley and the Middle Low German word for creek (German Bach, Middle Low German beek).

== See also ==
- List of rivers of Lower Saxony
