= Steimbke (Samtgemeinde) =

- Samtgemeinde
- Location of Steimbke within Nienburg district
- Interactive map of Steimbke
- Location within Germany Location within Lower Saxony
- Coordinates: 52°39′N 9°23′E
- Country: Germany
- State: Lower Saxony
- District: Nienburg
- Seat: Steimbke
- Subdivisions: 4 municipalities

Area
  - Total: 185.71 km^{2} (71.70 sq mi)

Population (2025-12-31)
  - Total: 7,255
  - Density: 39.07/km^{2} (101.2/sq mi)
- Time zone: UTC+01:00 (CET)
  - Summer (DST): UTC+02:00 (CEST)
- Website: www.steimbke.de

Steimbke is a Samtgemeinde ("collective municipality") in the district of Nienburg, in Lower Saxony, Germany. Its seat is in the village Steimbke.

The Samtgemeinde Steimbke consists of the following municipalities:

1. Linsburg
2. Rodewald
3. Steimbke
4. Stöckse
