= Unicorn Cave =

Show cave in Germany

Coordinates: 51°38′06″N 10°24′15″E

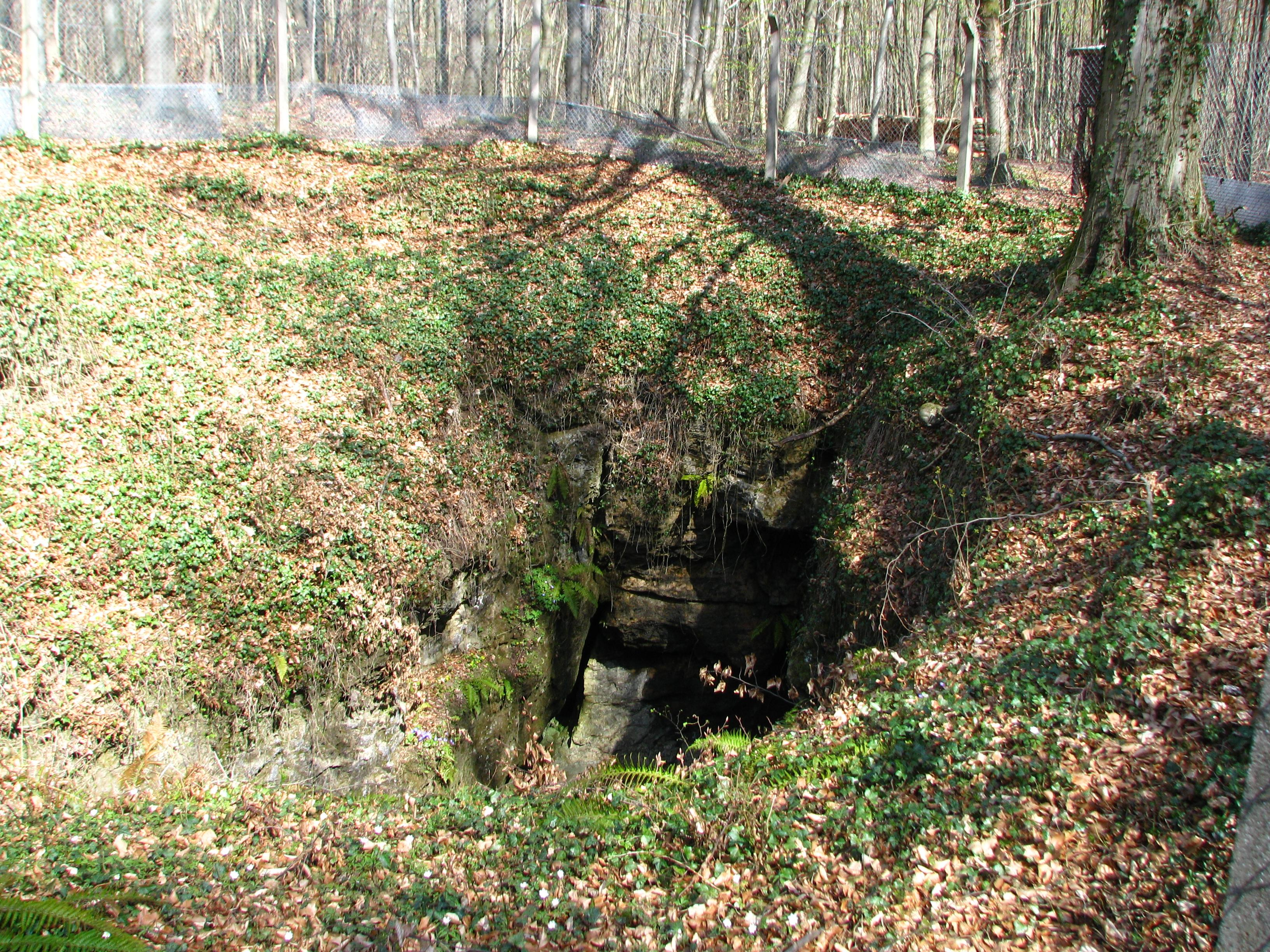
Natural entrance to the Unicorn Cave

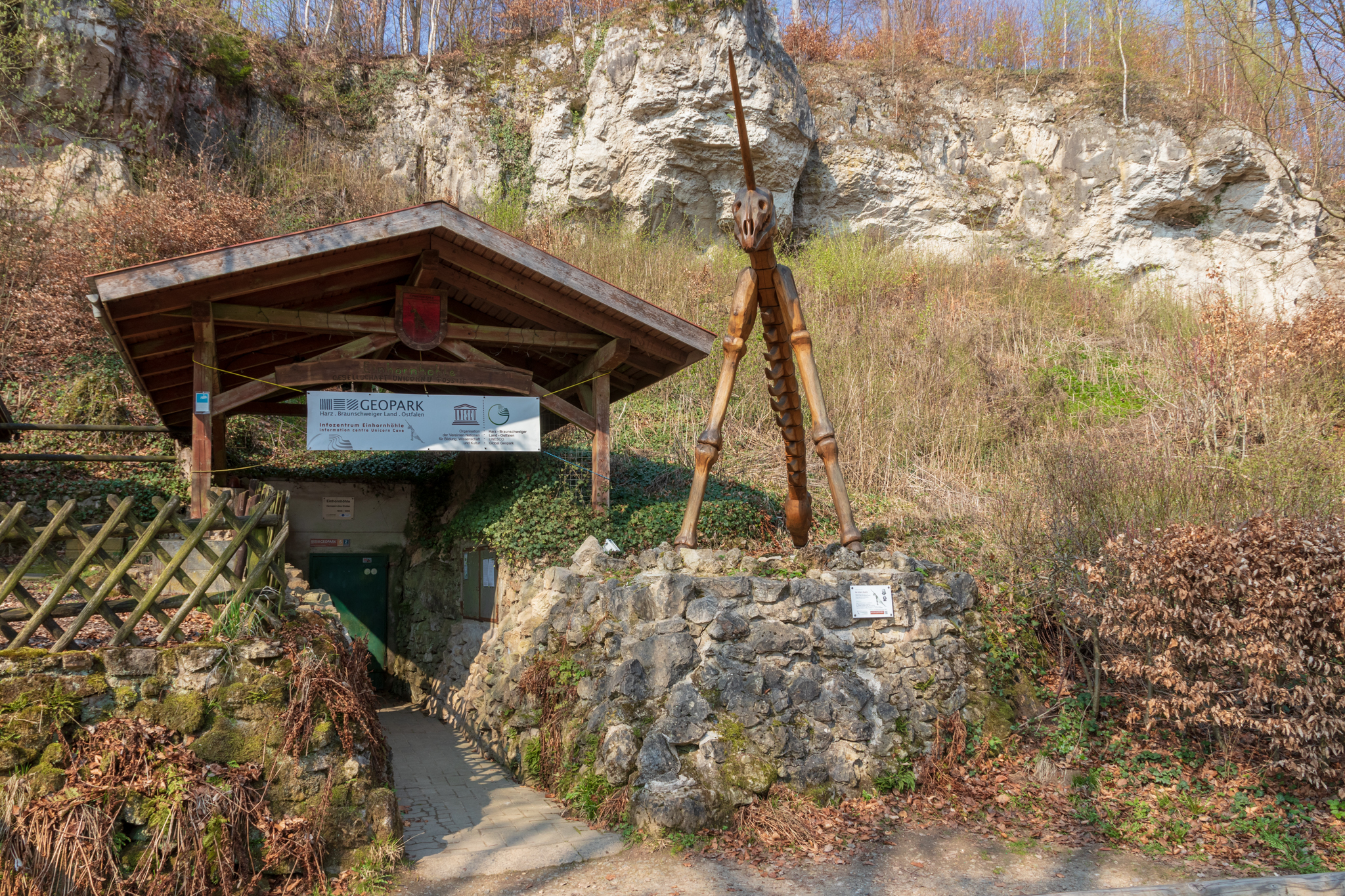
Public entrance to the Unicorn Cave

The Unicorn Cave (German: Einhornhöhle) is the largest show cave in the West Harz, about 1.5 kilometres (0.9 mi) northwest of Scharzfeld in the borough of Herzberg am Harz in central Germany. It is a karst cave developed in dolomite strata that is part of the Zechstein.

== History ==
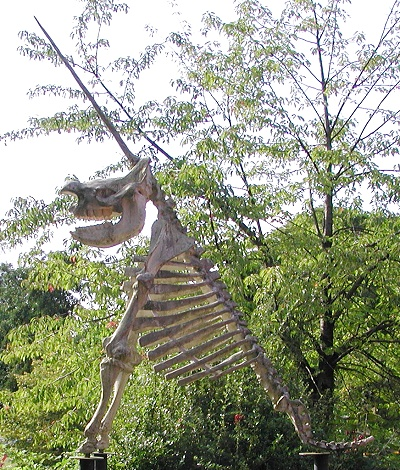
A reconstruction of a "skeleton", at Osnabrück Zoo

The cave was first mentioned in the records in 1541. In 1686, Gottfried Wilhelm Leibniz visited the cave and wrote a report about it mentioning the local trade with unicorn artefacts. In those days, fossilized bones supposed to be from unicorns were ground and used for making medicine. In the 17th century, Otto von Guericke, the mayor of Magdeburg, wrote a newspaper article about the finding of some ancient animal bones in the Zeunickenberg, a Harz mountain near Quedlinburg. Based on Guericke’s writings, Leibniz drew a fictional reconstruction of the unicorn's skeleton using the bones that had been found in the cave and published the drawing in his book Protogaea.

In 1872, Rudolf Virchow carried out an excavation there and determined that the unknown bones actually stem from extinct animals like mammoths and cave bears. Over 70 species of animal have been identified from the many bones that have been found, including 60 species of mammal; amongst them the cave lion and the wolf.

In 1905, the Unicorn Cave was made accessible to visitors by the construction of an entrance gallery. Since then, 270 metres (890 ft) of the total length of 610 metres (2,000 ft) have been opened up as a show cave. The Unicorn Cave is one of the three information centres of the Harz – Brunswick Land – Eastphalia National Geopark.

The Unicorn Cave has a checkpoint (no. 101) which is part of the Harzer Wandernadel network of hiking trails.

In 2021, the Giant deer bone of Einhornhöhle was found in the cave, the oldest piece of European art ever discovered, and attributed to Neanderthals.

== Folklore ==
According to local folklore, an old and mystical woman lived in a cave in the nearby village of Scharzfeld. As she was a pagan, she was forced to flee from a group of Frankish warriors, led by a monk in a black habit. A unicorn is said to have appeared and protected her from the pursuers, allowing her to escape and join the witches' community on the Brocken Mountain. The unicorn then chased away the warriors and black monk, causing him to disappear into a deep hole while running. This hole then led to the Unicorn Cave.

== See also ==
- List of show caves in Germany
