= Giant deer bone of Einhornhöhle =

Neolithic artwork in prehistoric Germany

Giant deer bone of Einhornhohle
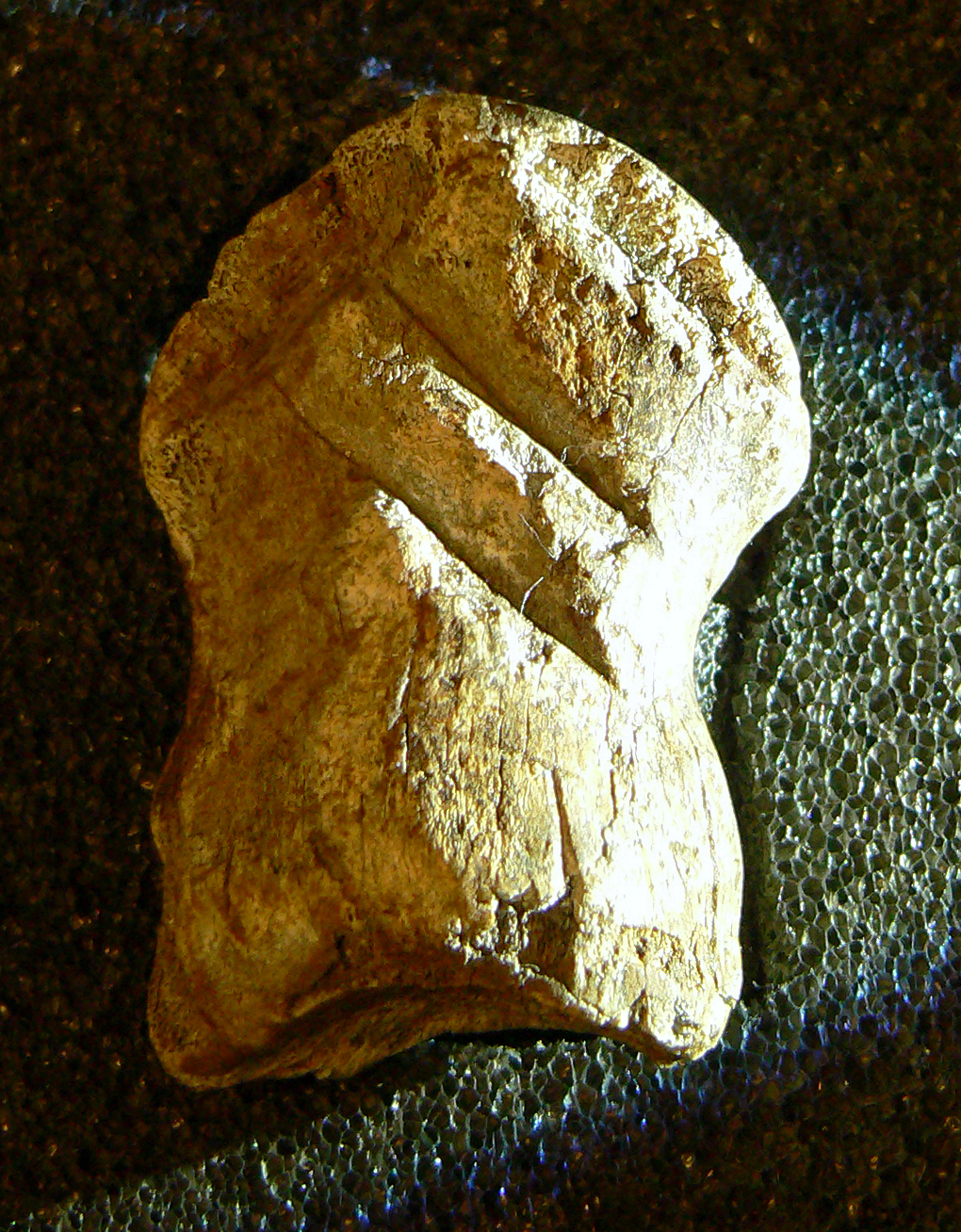
- Material: Bone
- Size: Length: c. 6 cm Width: 4 cm
- Created: c. 51,000 years ago by Neanderthals
- Discovered: 2021; Lower Saxony, Germany

The Giant deer bone of Einhornhöhle is a piece of art made in the Middle Paleolithic period by Neanderthals. Dated to 51,000 years ago, the piece is the oldest piece of art ever found in Europe.

It was found in the Einhornhöhle ('unicorn cave') in the Harz Mountains of Germany.

== Location ==
The Einhorn Cave near Scharzfeld is considered to be the key site for research into Neanderthals in northern Germany. Since 2019, archaeologists from the Lower Saxony State Office for Monument Preservation have been conducting excavations there with the Unicornu fossile society, the operating association of the Unicorn cave. The excavations are being conducted in the Jacob Friesen passage, in which hundreds of Neanderthal stone artifacts had already been recovered during the 1980s. This passage leads to a buried cave entrance, which is also being excavated. Its entrance portal collapsed about 10,000 years ago. Protected under the collapse of the ceiling made of stone and earth material, the bone artefact lay in a well-preserved Neanderthal cultural layer amidst the remains of hunting prey. The engraved bone was dated to around 51,000 years old, making it the oldest piece of art ever found in Europe.

== Description ==
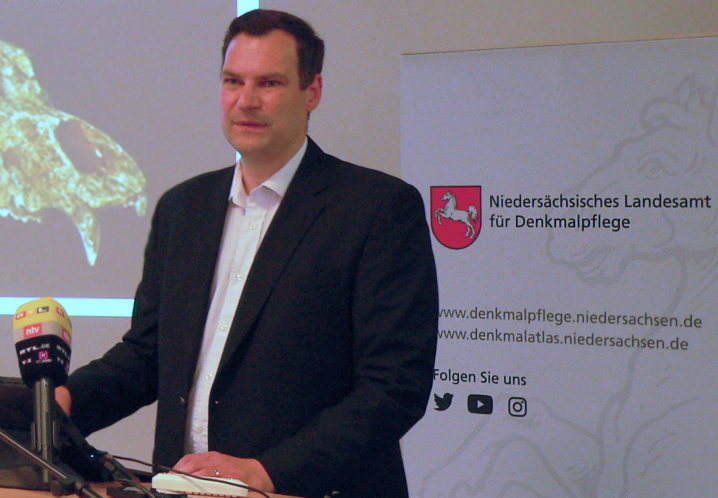
The excavation manager of Einhornhöhle Dirk Leder from the Lower Saxony State Office for the Preservation of Historical Monuments.

The find is a toe bone of a giant deer, about six centimeters long, four centimeters wide and three centimeters thick. On one side it features an angular line pattern of six engravings up to three centimeters long. Another pattern of four short engravings has been worked into the lower area. The bone can be placed vertically. Investigations using 3D microscopy showed that these are not battle marks, but intentionally incorporated notches. A radiocarbon dating of the bone gave an age of around 51,000 years.

The researchers assume that the Neanderthals deliberately chose bones of the giant deer for their engraving because it was an imposing animal with antlers almost four meters wide. To determine the cost of the engraving, the researchers conducted experimental archaeology on the foot bone of modern-day cattle, which is comparable to that of the giant deer. They showed that the bone first had to be boiled in order to be able to engrave the softened surface of the bone with stone implements. This took about 1.5 hours for the sample.

The Lower Saxony State Office for the Preservation of Monuments at the University of Göttingen, the Technical University of Braunschweig, the Universities of Kiel and Tübingen and the Free University of Berlin were involved in the research project. The research was funded by the Lower Saxony Ministry for Science and Culture as part of the "PRO Lower Saxony" program.

== Evaluation ==
The decorated piece of bone is around 10,000 years older than previous finds of Upper Palaeolithic art, and previous finds have been attributable to modern humans, who only arrived in Central Europe about 40,000 years ago.

According to Thomas Terberger from the Lower Saxony State Office for the Preservation of Monuments and the Seminar for Prehistory and Early History at the University of Göttingen, the find shows that the Neanderthals took the trouble to produce symbolic marks before the arrival of modern humans in Europe, which suggests considerable cognitive abilities. The processed piece of bone speaks for the creative power of Neanderthals and suggests that they communicated at least through symbols. It is an indication that the Neanderthals had an aesthetic sensibility. Terberger considers the bone from the cave to be outstanding evidence from the time of the Neanderthals in Lower Saxony and one of the most important finds from the time of the Neanderthals in Central Europe. The paleontologist Silvia Bello from London's Natural History Museum sees the find as one of the most complex artistic expressions of Neanderthals.

== Bibliography ==
- Fox-Skelly, Jasmin. "The animals with an eye for art". BBC.
- Gershon, Livia. "Is This 51,000-Year-Old Deer Bone Carving an Early Example of Neanderthal Art?". Smithsonian Magazine.
- "Symbole des Neandertalers aus der Einhornhöhle im Harz". landesarchaeologen.de (in German). 30 June 2021.
- Leder, Dirk; Hermann, Raphael; Hüls, Matthias; Russo, Gabriele; Hoelzmann, Philipp; Nielbock, Ralf; Böhner, Utz; Lehmann, Jens; Meier, Michael; Schwalb, Antje; Tröller-Reimer, Andrea; Koddenberg, Tim; Terberger, Thomas (September 2021). "A 51,000-year-old engraved bone reveals Neanderthals' capacity for symbolic behaviour". Nature Ecology & Evolution. 5 (9): 1273–1282. doi:10.1038/s41559-021-01487-z. ISSN 2397-334X. PMID 34226702. S2CID 235746596.
- McDermott, Amy (2 November 2021). "What was the first "art"? How would we know?". Proceedings of the National Academy of Sciences. 118 (44) e2117561118. Bibcode:2021PNAS..11817561M. doi:10.1073/pnas.2117561118. PMC 8612210. PMID 34706942.
- "Kreative Neandertaler verzierten Knochen". n-tv.de (in German). n-tv. 5 July 2021.
- "Universität Göttingen - Information for the Media". www.uni-goettingen.de (in German). Universität Göttingen. 5 July 2021.
- "Neandertaler: Frühmensch schnitzte Muster in Knochen". DIE WELT (in German). 5 July 2021.
- "Neandertaler als Künstler? - Frühmenschen hatten "ästhetisches Empfinden"". Die Welt (in German). 5 July 2021.
- Dirk Leder, Raphael Hermann, Matthias Hüls, Gabrielle Russo, Philipp Hoelzmann, Ralf Nielbock, Utz Böhner, Jens Lehmann, Michael Meier, Antje Schwalb, Andrea Tröller-Reimer, Tim Koddenberg, Thomas Terberger: A 51.000 year old engraved bone reveals Neanderthalers' capacity for symbolic behaviour. In: Nature Ecology & Evolution. vom 5. Juli 2021 doi:10.1038/s41559-021-01487-z
- Guido Kleinhubbert: Das Geheimnis der Einhornhöhle in: Der Spiegel vom 10. Juli 2021, S. 102–104 (Online hinter Paywall)
