= Gropenborn =

River in Germany

Location
- Country: Germany
- State: Lower Saxony

Physical characteristics
- Mouth
  - location: Sieber
  - coordinates: 51.7004°N 10.4332°E

Basin features
- Progression: Sieber→ Oder→ Rhume→ Leine→ Aller→ Weser→ North Sea

Gropenborn is a river of Lower Saxony, Germany.

It rises to over 560 meters above sea level and flows mostly to the northwest, where it is separated by the Gropenbornskopf from the Sieber. After about 2 km (1.2 mi) it discharges an altitude of less than 340 m northeast of the village Sieber in the district of Göttingen into the Sieber.

The dominant organism group are caddisflies with 12 species.

== See also ==
- List of rivers of Lower Saxony
