= Harz – Brunswick Land – Eastphalia National Geopark =

The Harz – Brunswick Land – Eastphalia National Geopark (German: Nationaler Geopark Harz – Braunschweiger Land – Ostfalen) in central Germany extends from the Flechtingen Hills in the north to the gypsum karst region on the southern edge of the Harz and from east to west over the entire width of the mountain range on the territory of the three federal states of Lower Saxony, Thuringia and Saxony-Anhalt.

It includes nature parks and other natural protected areas which are the reason why the Harz mountains, the Elm and the Drömling are destinations for tourists seeking to be close to nature.

== History ==
The idea of establishing a national geopark emerged from the Eastphalian Open-air and Experience Museum in Königslutter. In 2002 the museum succeeded in engaging the Harz Regional Association and the GUf as partners.

The Geopark has information centres in Königslutter, Quedlinburg, the Brocken House and the Unicorn Cave.

In 2015 it became a UNESCO Global Geopark
