= Linsburg =

- Municipality
- Coat of arms

- Location of Linsburg within Nienburg/Weser district
- Interactive map of Linsburg
- Location within Germany Location within Lower Saxony
- Coordinates: 52°35′35″N 09°18′12″E
- Country: Germany
- State: Lower Saxony
- District: Nienburg/Weser
- Municipal assoc.: Steimbke

Government
  - Mayor: Jürgen Leseberg

Area
  - Total: 23.5 km^{2} (9.1 sq mi)
- Elevation: 47 m (154 ft)

Population (2025-12-31)
  - Total: 1,023
  - Density: 43.5/km^{2} (113/sq mi)
- Time zone: UTC+01:00 (CET)
  - Summer (DST): UTC+02:00 (CEST)
- Postal codes: 31636
- Dialling codes: 05027
- Vehicle registration: NI

Linsburg is a municipality in the district of Nienburg, in Lower Saxony, Germany.

== Geography ==
The municipality of Linsburg lies on the northern edge of the state forest of Grinderwald, about 10 minutes drive south of the county town of Nienburg/Weser.
