= Reihendorf =

Type of village in German-speaking countries

The Reihendorf (German pronunciation: [ˈʁaɪəndɔʁf], "row village" or ribbon development, plural: Reihendörfer) or Hufendorf (German pronunciation: [ˈhuːfn̩dɔʁf], "oxgang village") is the name used of a particular form of linear settlement in German-speaking countries that is characterized by rows of houses situated along a linear object such as a riverbank, road, valley, or stream.

== Description ==
Reihendörfer may consist of a one or two rows of houses or farmsteads; the latter being arranged either side of the village street. The farmland associated with each dwelling is adjacent to it, which has the advantage of saving time and reducing the effort involved in transport. The farm can be worked just outside the farmyard or within it e.g. manure can be readily transported from the cowsheds to the fields and the harvest can be easily brought in to the barns. The farmers also have better oversight of their land.

A Reihendorf does not usually have common land.

== Types ==
Specific forms of Reihendorf include the Straßendorf ("road village"), an elongated village that runs along a road; the Waldhufendorf, typical of forest clearings; the Marschhufendorf, found in marshland; and the Hagenhufendorf, which runs along one side of a river.
