= Gropenbornskopf =

- Location within Lower Saxony

Highest point
- Elevation: 581.2 m (1,907 ft)
- Coordinates: 51°41′39″N 10°27′04″E

Geography
- Location: east of Sieber, Göttingen district, Lower Saxony, Germany
- Parent range: Harz Mountains

The Gropenbornskopf is a northern offshoot of the Aschentalshalbe in the Harz Mountains of central Germany, two kilometres east of Sieber in the district of Göttingen in the state of Lower Saxony. It is 581.2 metres high and was named after the Gropenborn stream that flows downs its western side, and which it initially divides from the River Sieber.

== Sources ==
- Topographic map 1:25000, No. 4328 Bad Lauterberg im Harz
