= Hagenhufendorf =

Layout used in medieval settlements

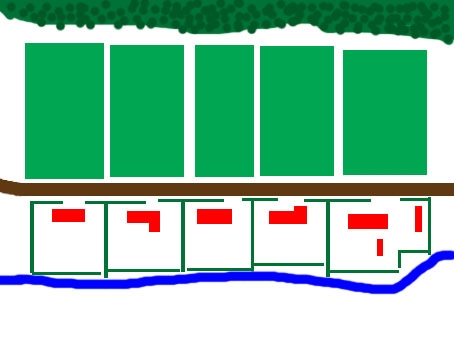
Plan of a Hagenhufendorf

A Hagenhufendorf (German pronunciation: [ˈhaːɡn̩ˌhuːfn̩dɔʁf]; also Bachhufendorf, Hagenhufensiedlung or Hägerhufensiedlung) is an elongated settlement, similar to a Reihendorf, laid out along a road running parallel to a stream, whereby only one side of the road has houses, whilst on the opposite side are the hides (Hufen), the handkerchief-shaped farmer's fields of medieval origin, about 20 to 40 morgens in area.

== Name ==
This German term is probably derived from Hagenrecht ("hedging right"), i.e. the owner had a right to enclose the land he used. This went even further for the Hägerhufensiedlungen, where there was a Hägerjunker in charge and special courts dealing with enclosure issues, the Hägergerichte.

== Description ==
The Hagenhufensiedlung was a form of planned settlement typical of the High Middle Ages that consisted of individually owned strips of land that were strung together in a line. The hides were as wide as the farmstead, but could be several hundred metres long.

The enclosed plots were used as vegetable gardens and for keeping small animals. The stream at the back of the farmhouses supplied the necessary water. From this type of settlement, long linear villages developed like Auhagen, Wiedensahl, Isernhagen, Kathrinhagen or Rodewald in Lower Saxony. Hagenhufensiedlungen may be found from the Taunus region as far as Western Pomerania. The Hägerhufensiedlung is restricted to a region in the area of the Weser Uplands, Leine Uplands and Lippe.

== Origin ==
The Hagenhufendörfer arose from the planned settlement of forested areas, predominantly in the 13th century, with the aim of clearing and cultivating the land. These villages had a lokator with a double hide (Doppelhufe). The Hägerhufensiedlungen go back to the 11th-century Eschershausen Treaty. Although they had no double hide and no lokator, they did have special enclosure rights (Hägerrecht).

== Extent ==
Hagenhufendörfer are especially common in the Börde regions, on the North German Plain immediately north of the German Central Uplands. The best-known region, with many such villages, is the area around Stadthagen, which was itself founded as a planned town in the centre of the plain that was to be settled, between the Schaumburg Forest and Bückebergen. The Hägerhufensiedlungen of the fertile plain can no longer be made out in the countryside.

== Sources ==
- Andreas Reuschel: Hagenhufensiedlungen oder "Hägerhufensiedlungen" in der Ithbörde? Ein Beitrag zur Ausdifferenzierung eines siedlungsgeographischen Terminus und Phänomens, dissertation in Bonn 2010
