= Scharzfeld =

German village

- Village
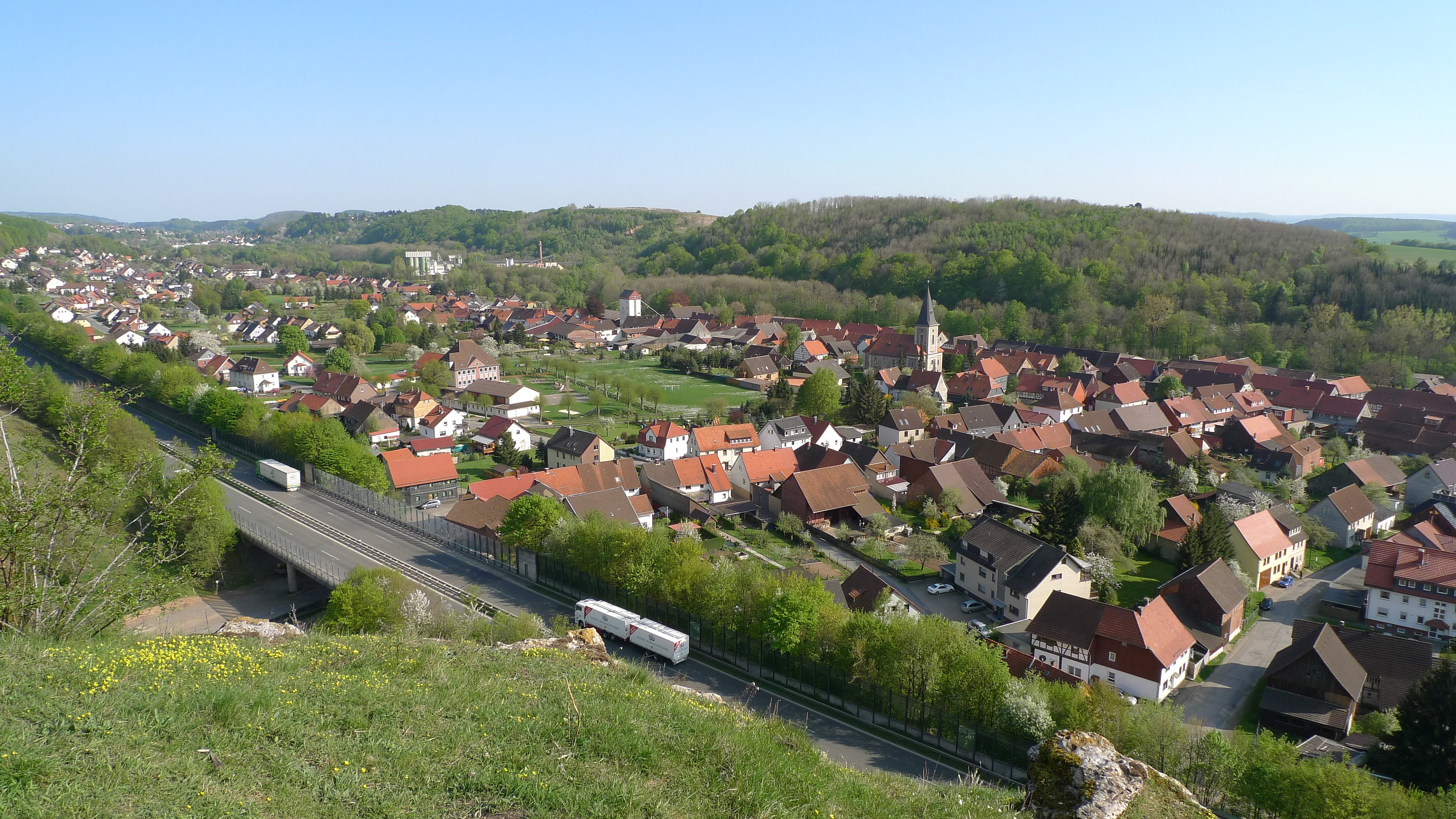
- View of Scharzfeld from Ritterstein

- Location within Lower Saxony
- Coordinates: 51°37′48″N 10°22′56″E
- Country: Germany
- State: South Lower Saxony
- District: Göttingen
- Borough: Herzberg am Harz
- Elevation: 220 m (720 ft)

Population (1 October 2006)
  - Total: 1,765

Scharzfeld is a village in the borough of Herzberg am Harz in the district of Göttingen in South Lower Saxony, Germany.

Scharzfeld lies at a height of about 220 m (720 ft) above sea level and has 1,765 inhabitants (as at 1 October 2006).

The first recorded mention of Scharzfeld is in a deed that relates to the year 952 and was probably forged in the 13th century. This stated that Otto the Great confirmed Schartfelde and other villages as belonging to the monastery at Pöhlde.

== Culture and places of interest ==
- Scharzfeld stone church on the Steinberg
- Nature reserve (dry grassland) with views over Scharzfeld near the Steinkirche
- Unicorn Cave
- Scharzfels Castle ruins
- Großer Knollen and its pub
