= Steimbke =

Municipality in Lower Saxony, Germany

- Municipality
- Coat of arms

- Location of Steimbke within Nienburg/Weser district
- Interactive map of Steimbke
- Location within Germany Location within Lower Saxony
- Coordinates: 52°39′44″N 9°24′15″E
- Country: Germany
- State: Lower Saxony
- District: Nienburg/Weser
- Municipal assoc.: Steimbke

Government
  - Mayor: Friedrich Andermann (CDU)

Area
  - Total: 63.06 km^{2} (24.35 sq mi)
- Elevation: 51 m (167 ft)

Population (2025-12-31)
  - Total: 2,405
  - Density: 38.14/km^{2} (98.78/sq mi)
- Time zone: UTC+01:00 (CET)
  - Summer (DST): UTC+02:00 (CEST)
- Postal codes: 31634
- Dialling codes: 05026
- Vehicle registration: NI
- Website: www.steimbke.de

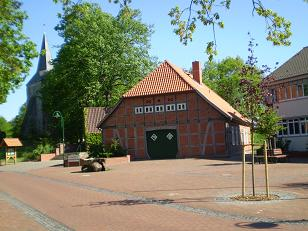
Steimbke town hall square and church

Steimbke is a municipality in the district Nienburg, in Lower Saxony, Germany. It is situated approximately 12 km east of Nienburg, and 40 km northwest of Hanover, in a swamp and heathland, whereas the Blindesee takes centre stage.

== Policy ==
=== Municipality of Steimbke ===
The villages Steimbke, Wendenborstel, Glashof, Eckelshof, Lichtenhorst, Lichtenmoor, and Sonnenborstel comprise the municipality of Steimbke. Steimbke is also the seat of the ("collective municipality") Steimbke.

=== Municipal council ===
The municipal council Steimbke has 12 members elected and a mayor elected directly. Since the local election on 10 September 2006, two parties and one Wählergemeinschaft represent it.

- CDU - 7 seats
- SPD - 2 seats
- WG Steimbke - 4 seats

re in 1934 by beginning oil production. "Brigitta" established an estate for industrial workers with bounteous sports facilities, a stadion with flood light and an indoor- as well as an outdoor swimming pool. In the meantime, the reduction of oil production has resulted to the abolishment of the pumpjacks that in former times have been Steimbke's landmark. As of 30 June 2005, Steimbke had a population of 2.739.
