= Großer Knollen =

Mountain in Lower Saxony, Germany

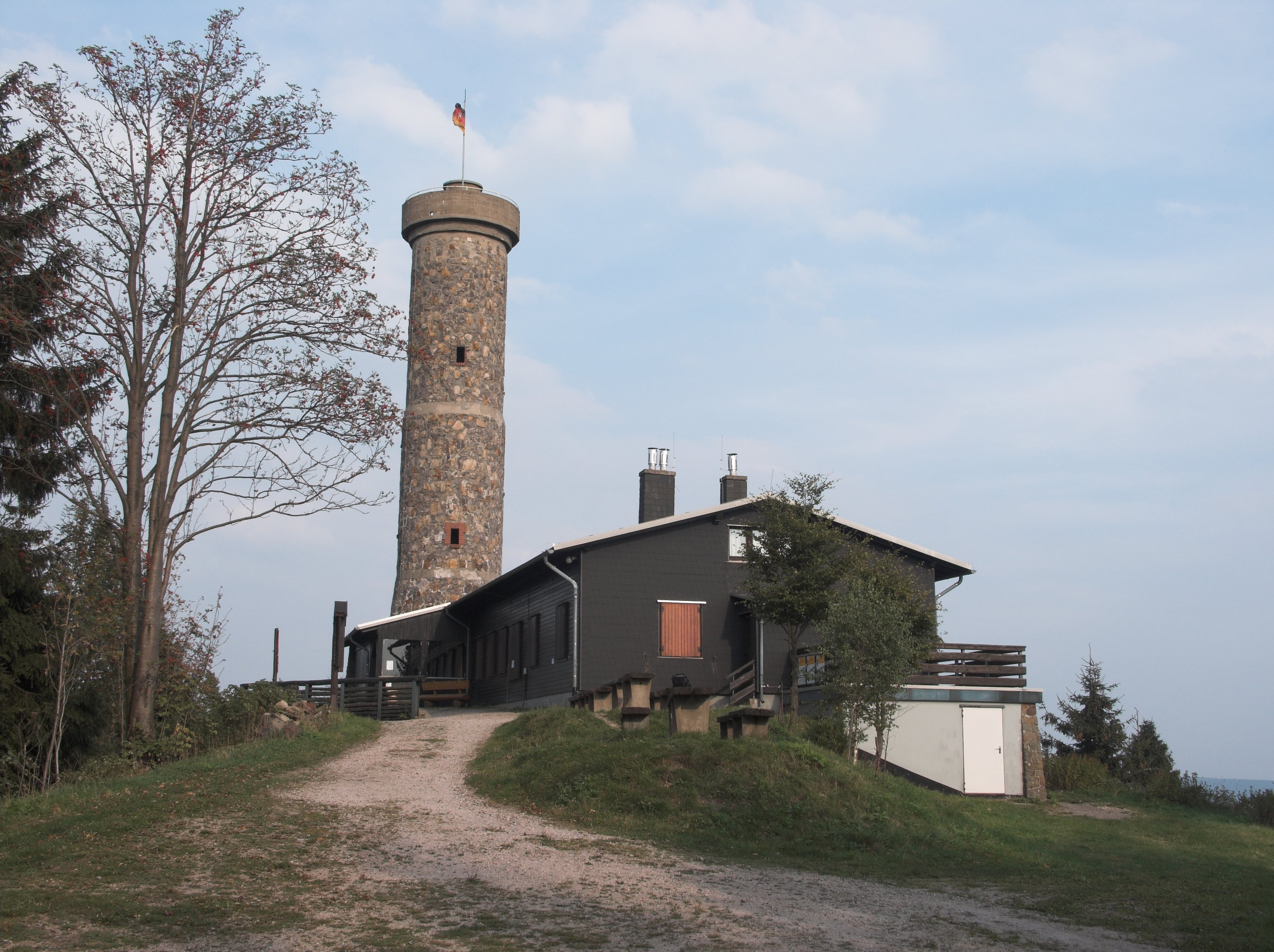
- Großer Knollen: summit with observation tower and inn

Highest point
- Elevation: 688 m (2,257 ft)
- Coordinates: 51°40′02″N 10°25′47″E

Geography
- Location within Lower Saxony
- Location: Lower Saxony, Germany
- Parent range: Harz

The Großer Knollen (also the Groß Knollen; colloquially referred to as the Knollen, historically the Grosze Knolle) is a 687.4-metre-high (2,255 ft) mountain in the southwestern part of the Harz in Lower Saxony, Germany.

== Geography ==
The Großer Knollen is located northeast of Herzberg am Harz and Scharzfeld, northwest of Bad Lauterberg im Harz and south of the hamlet of Sieber. It is surrounded by several other mountains and hills that range in height between 550 and 650 m above mean sea level. Just under 1 km away to the southwest the Kleiner Knollen rises to a height of 631 m.

== Geology ==
The Großer Knollen is a porphyritic volcano. When climbing the mountain walkers can see to the side of the path in places the reddish colouring in the rock that is due to the volcanic rock, porphyry. About 800 metres east of the Großer Knollen is the Knollengrube ("Knollen Pit"), in which iron ore was mined in 1925.

== Observation tower ==
From the roughly 20 m high observation tower, which stands next to the inn on the summit of the Großer Knollen, there is a view not only over the mountain peaks of the Harz, but also southwards to the Rotenberg and Eichsfeld. In good conditions visitors can even see as far as the Thuringian Forest to the south.

== Walking ==
Numerous walking trails radiate from the summit, including paths to Bad Lauterberg, Herzberg, Scharzfeld, Sieber and Sankt Andreasberg. The roughly 12 km long path to Sankt Andreasberg runs over a crest over 600 m high with many wonderful views.

The Großer Knollen is checkpoint no. 150 in the Harzer Wandernadel walking trail network.

== Forest ==
Today the lower flanks of the Großer Knollen are mainly covered by beech, but some spruce also grows in higher areas. In 1596 it was entirely covered in beech woods, in 1630 there were also some sycamores.

== See also ==
- List of mountains and hills of Lower Saxony

== Sources ==
- Topographic map 1:25,000 series, No. 4328 Bad Lauterberg im Harz
- Topographic map 1:25,000 series, No. 4228 Riefensbeek (to determine the isolation and prominence)
