= Sieber (Herzberg am Harz) =

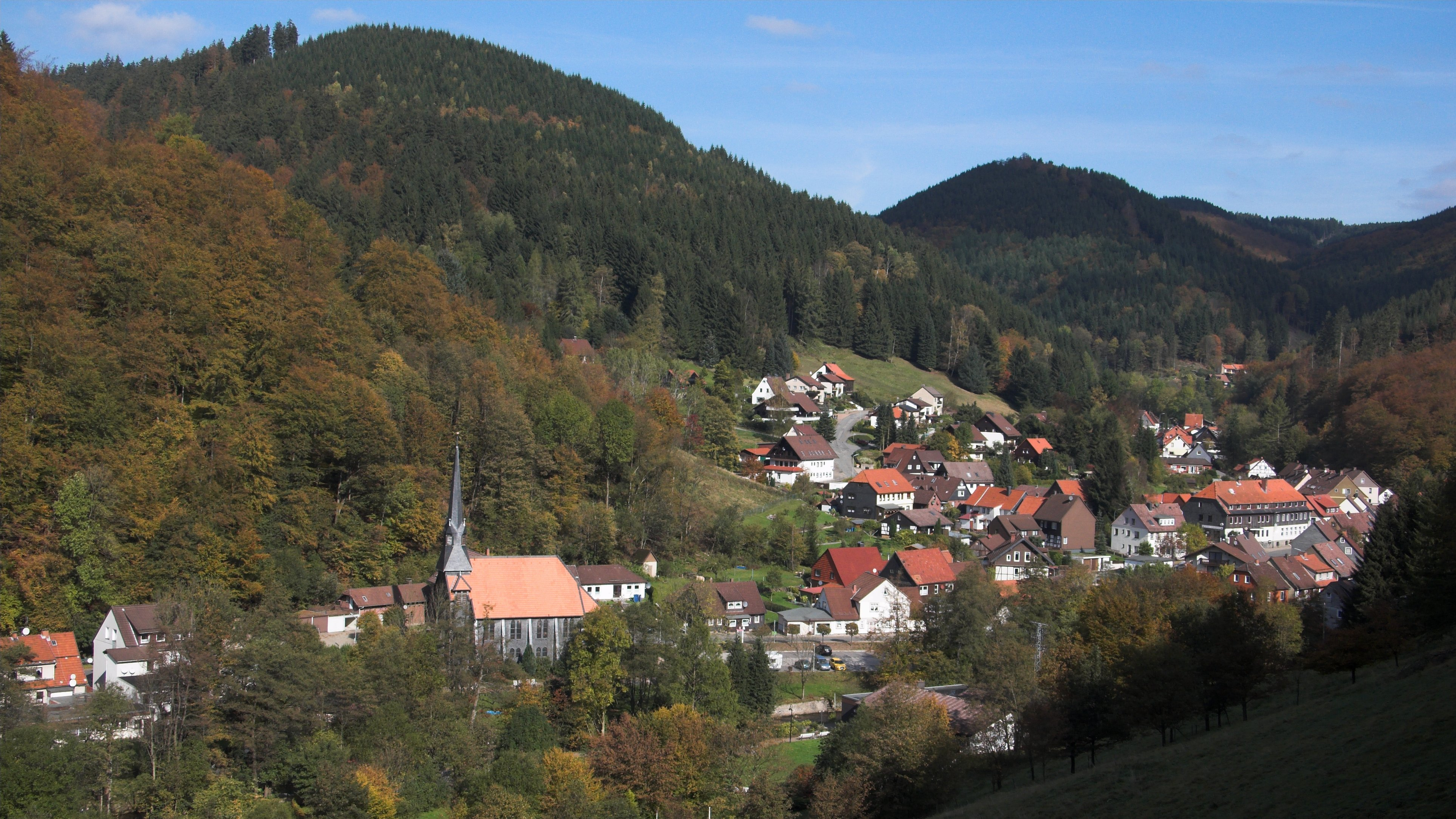
East...

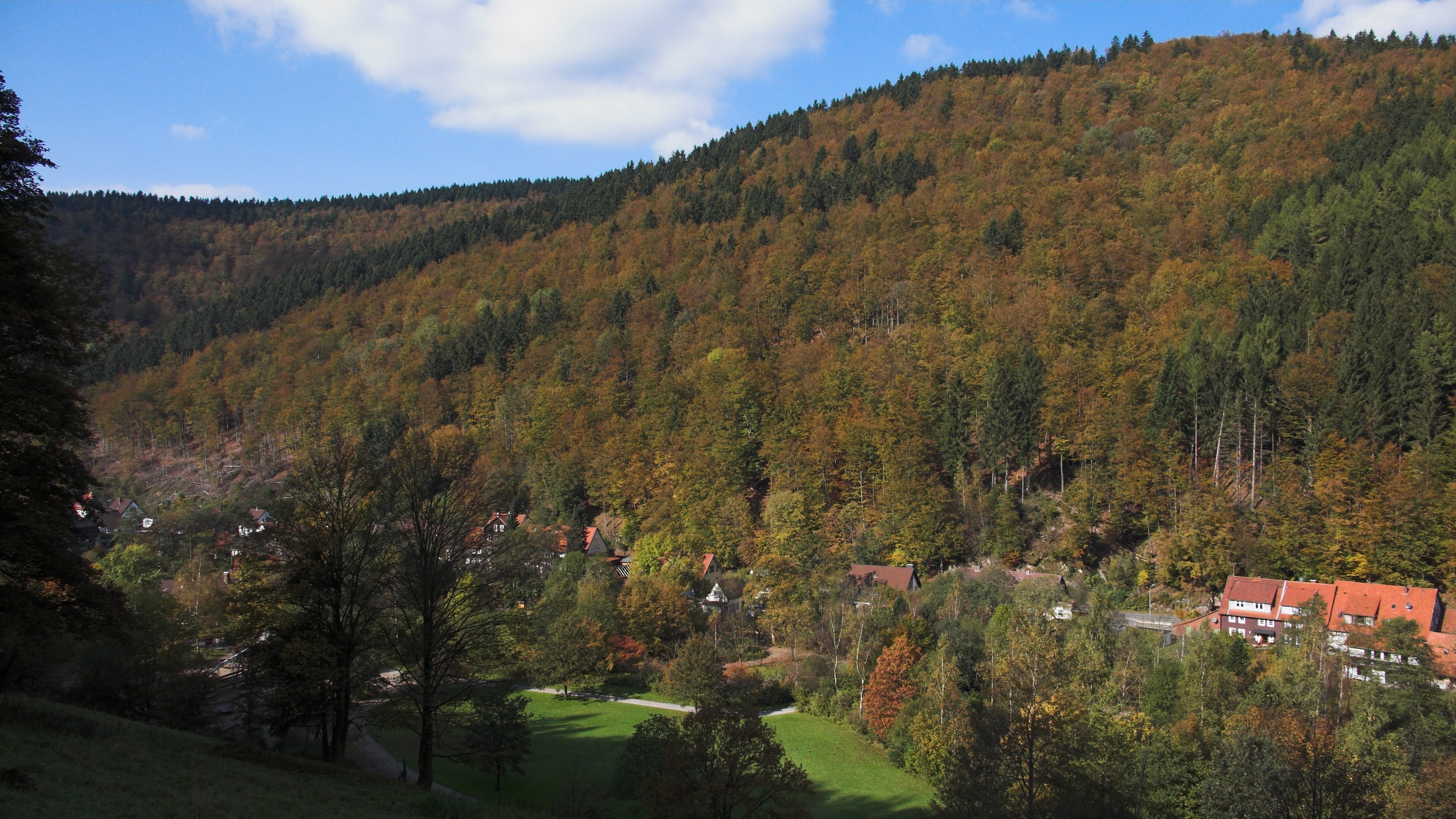
...and west Sieber

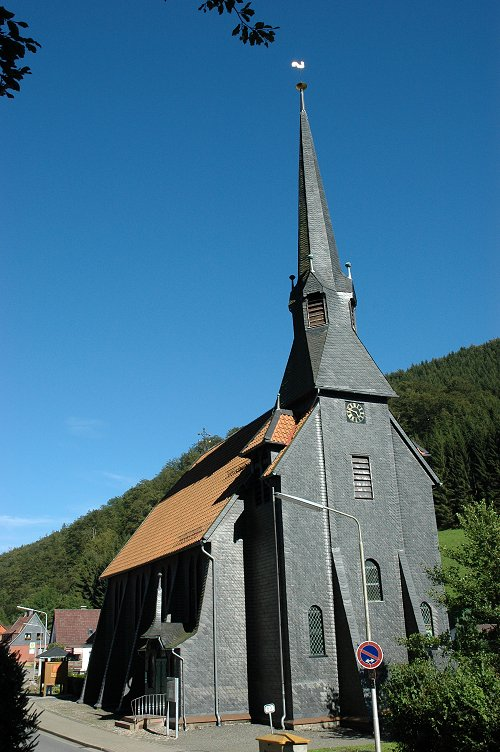
The church in Sieber

Sieber (German pronunciation: [ˈziːbɐ]) is a village in the borough of Herzberg am Harz in the district of Göttingen in South Lower Saxony (Germany).

Sieber lies at a height of 340 m above sea level and has about 600 inhabitants (1 October 2006). The settlement is spread out over a length of several kilometres in a narrow valley, running from east to west, through which the river of the same name flows. A tributary of the Sieber, the Goldenke, joins it in the village. Sieber has a Protestant church, St. Benedict, in which concerts also take place.

== History ==
Sieber was a home to the mining industry, but also to ancillary industries such as grinding shops. Furthermore, forestry had been an important employer for several centuries.

Until the mid-1980s plans were pursued to impound and use the water of the Sieber with one or more dams. Some plans envisaged the flooding of the entire village, with the population being rehoused in the Ilme valley. The relocated spa was promised the "best opportunities to get off the ground". Other plans foresaw a high dam immediately above the village. The latest plans by the Harzwasserwerke, the so-called "multi-stage solution" consisted of two smaller barriers in the upper reaches of the Sieber valley and in the Kulmke to transfer water into the Söse, and the construction of a "Lower Sieber Dam" between Sieber and Herzberg. In the end strong opposition from the population of the entire South Harz region ensured that these plans were stopped. Today, the Sieber is the largest unregulated river in the Harz.

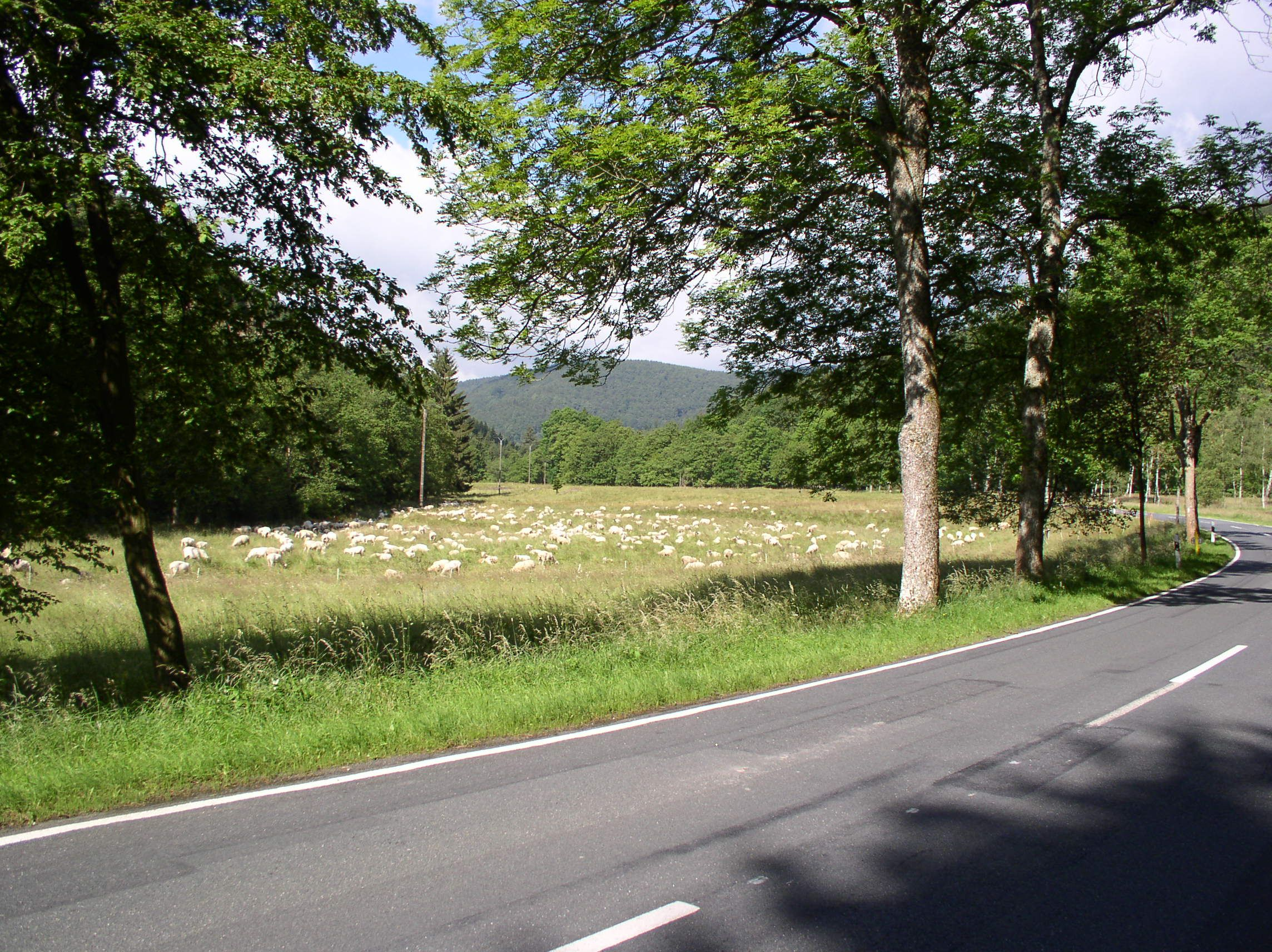
Flock of sheep in the Sieber valley

== Walking and recreation ==
Today the idyllic valley is a particular magnet for walkers, hikers, Nordic walkers and cyclists. Walkers especially can enjoy the Panorama Way along the southern side of the valley on a sunny day (the first two photographs are taken from this path). An easier path runs west of the valley into neighbouring Paradies. Longer and more difficult hiking trails lead to Hanskühnenburg, the Großer Knollen and Sankt Andreasberg. There is a large adventure playground for children. Sieber also has a heated swimming pool and an pleasant spa park. In summer, in the surrounding meadows one can often see a few herds of sheep.

=== Sons and daughters of the village ===
- Wilhelm Pook (1905-1993), architect and town and country planner
