= Wolfsberg (Calenberg Land) =

Hill in the Hanover Region, Germany

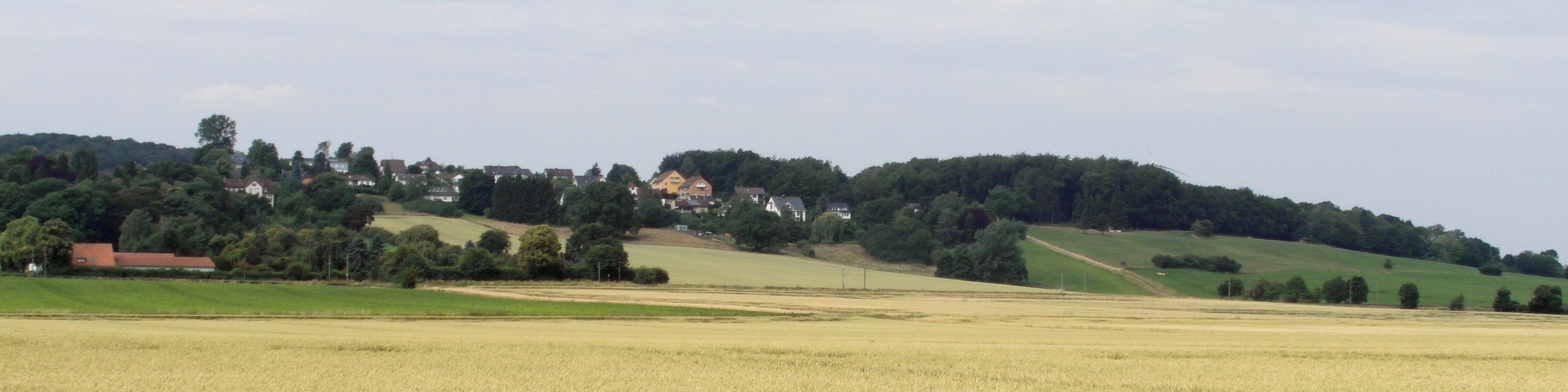
- View looking west to the Wolfsberg near Lüdersen

Highest point
- Elevation: 152.1 m above sea level (NN) (499 ft)
- Prominence: 11 m (36 ft)
- Isolation: 0.45 km (0.28 mi) → Süllberg
- Coordinates: 52°15′28″N 9°39′55″E

Geography
- Location within Lower Saxony
- Location: Hanover Region, Lower Saxony (Germany)
- Parent range: Calenberg Land

The Wolfsberg (German pronunciation: [ˈvɔlfsˌbɛʁk]) is a spur of the Süllberg, 152.1 m above sea level (NN), in the Calenberg Land near Springe in the Hanover Region.

== Location ==
The Wolfsberg lies just under 1 kilometre (0.62 mi) north-northeast of the Süllberg which lies east of the Deister ridge in Germany's Central Uplands. It rises around 13 kilometres (8.1 mi) south-southwest of the centre of Hanover in the borough of Springe and municipality of Wennigsen, whose boundary runs over the northwestern flank of the hill. The village of Lüdersen which belongs to Springe lies on the Wolfsberg, the parish to the west belongs to Holtensen.

== Geology and conservation ==
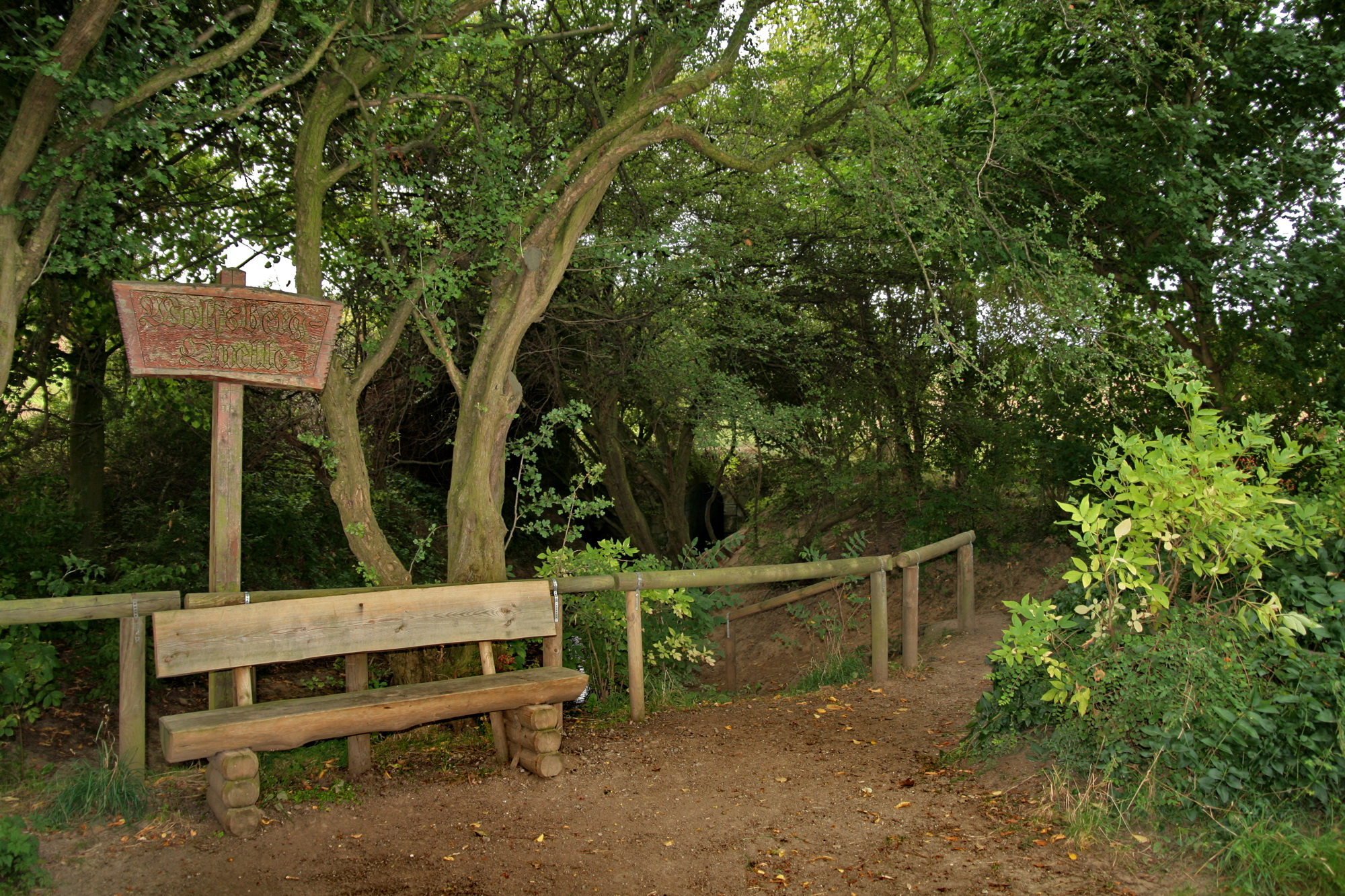
Wolfsberg spring

The Wolfsberg was formed in the Jurassic period. On its eastern side there are sandstone quarries with beds of Deister sandstone, which were exhausted in the 19th century. Since 1968 the Wolfsberg has been on the far side of the limit of building for protected area H-22 in the Hanover Region (this is currently being reviewed. According to political decisions the Wolfsberg element of LSG H-23 is to become part of North Deister). The reason for conservation is based on being the "central part of the natural space known as the Calenberg Loess Börde (Calenberger Lößbörde). This natural space is characterised by a layer of loess, up to 3 metres thick, that was formed in the Late and Post-Ice Age by wind excavation and deposition at the foot of the Central Uplands." On the northern slope of the hill is the Wolfsberg Spring which has been enclosed for tourist reasons. From there rises a subordinate tributary stream of the Ihme, which flows not far from Linderte and Vörie.

== Settlement ==
On the eastern edge of the Wolfsberg is the deserted village of Weningrodere. This was abandoned in the phase of the Late Middle Ages when villages emptied out. It was last mentioned in the records in 1370. The village lay where the road from Holtensen to Lüdersen met the road from Lüdersen to Linderte. Today the western side of the Wolfsberg is built upon. On the higher slopes of the domed summit, on which there is a residential quarter of Lüdersen, are residential roads.
