= Knigge =

People:

- Adolph Franz Friedrich Ludwig (Freiherr von) Knigge (1752–1796), German writer
- Rolf Peter Knigge (1951–1990), German pop singer/songwriter

Etiquette

- Adolph Freiherr Knigge's 1788 book On Human Relations is still often referred to as Knigge
- Derived from the above, any ruleset or book that concerns itself with etiquette

== See also ==
- 32899 Knigge (1994 PY1), a main-belt asteroid discovered on 1994 by F. Borngen
