= Holtensen =

Holtensen may refer to the following places in Lower Saxony, Germany:

- a part of Barsinghausen
- a part of Einbeck
- a part of Göttingen
- a part of Hamelin
- a part of Springe
- a part of Wennigsen
