= Süllberg =

Süllberg may refer to the following hills in Germany:

- Süllberg (Calenberg Land) (198.2 m), summit in the Calenberg Land near Springe, Hanover Region, Lower Saxony
- Süllberg (Hamburg) (74.7 m), hill Hamburg-Blankenese, Hamburg
- Süllberg (Hildesheim Forest) (277 m), summit in the Hildesheim Forest near Bad Salzdetfurth, Hildesheim district, Lower Saxony
