= All Sports Team Hannover =

The All Sports Team Hannover is a dragon boat team of the Hannoverschen Kanuclub v. 1921 e.V. from Germany.

== History ==
The team was founded in 2000 by Denis Starke during the dragon races in Hannover which takes place yearly on Whitsundays. The team's name is based upon the variety of sports players who have been the core of the team at the early beginning. The paddlers were chosen for the team Verein zur Förderung des Spitzensports (Supporters club of top sports). This organization supported top sportsmen and women in many different sport activities. To improve the relationship among themselves and to have fun together the club sent regularly a fun team to the Whitsunday dragon boat races in Hanover. After winning several times the fun team titles some sportsmen decided to do dragon boat racing seriously and to join the canoe club HKC. So initially were handball players, judo fighters, rugby players, water polo players, dancers, swimmers, dart players and also some paddlers in the boat of the All Sports Team. The ambition in combination with the sportive talent of the outsiders together with the know-how of the canoe top sports men were the basis for the success of the All Sports Team. The training course is the Maschsee, a lake in the middle of Hanover city.

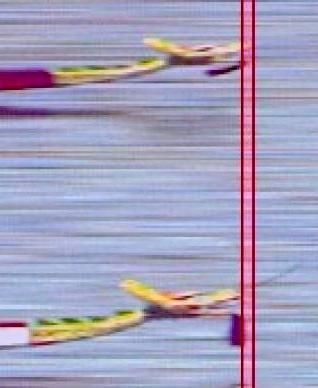
Foto finish German Championship 2007, less than 1/100 of a second ahead of Drag Attack Wuppertal

The All Sports Team was highly involved in the technical development of dragon boat sport in Germany, because it is practicing the Hybrid Exit, a special paddling style.

== Representing the state Lower Saxony ==
The most prominent paddler of the All Sports Team and during the 10-years-anniversary celebration in 2010 becoming honorary member, was the former home secretary and sports minister Uwe Schünemann. He joined the Unification Day Cup dragon boat races on the occasion of the German Unity Day dragon boat races. The first race took place on October 3, 2007. The All Sports Team represents the state Lower Saxony and won the cup already three times.

== Titles and success ==
Achieved solely in senior (ICF) and premium (IDBF) classes (under the age of 40), except 2 titles year 2013 in Duisburg

National Team WC/WG	1× Gold	3× Silver	6× Bronze	10 Total
National Team EC	1× Gold	1× Silver	1× Bronze	3 Total
Club-Crew World Championships	4× Gold	10× Silver	4× Bronze	18 Total
Club-Crew European Championships	10× Gold	4× Silver	2× Bronze	16 Total
German Championships	70× Gold	42× Silver	26× Bronze	135 Total

Overall Total: 185 Medals

2026

- 12. Common German Championships in München: 1× Bronze (Premier Mixed 200m), 2x Silver (Premier Mixed 500m and 2000m)

2025

- 11. Common German Championships in Halle: 1× Bronze (Premier Mixed 2000m)

2024 - nothing to report
2023 - nothing to report
2022

- Common German Championships in Munich: 1× Bronze (Open Smallboat 2000m)

2021

- The local sports magazine "Sportbuzzer Hannover" nominates the All Sports Team for the election "Legends of the Decade", and the All Sports Team got 3rd place.
- German Championships DDV in Brandenburg: 1× Bronze (2000m Premier Open Small Boat)

2020 - nothing to report
2019 - nothing to report
2018

- German Indoor-Championships in Minden: 1× Gold, German Champion Mixed
- Common German Championships in Munich: 1× Bronze (Mixed 500m)
- Common German Small Boat Championships in Schwerin: 2× Bronze (200m Mixed and Open)

2017

- Common German Championships in Brandenburg: 2× Silver (Mixed 200m, Mixed Smallboat 200m), 1× Bronze (Women Smallboat 200m)

2016

- German long-distance Championships in Saarbruecken: 1× Bronze (mixed 12.6 km)
- Common German Small Boat Championships in Schwerin: 6× Gold (Mixed 200m, 500m, Women 200m, 500m, 2000m, Open 200m)
- Common German Standard Boat Championships in Berlin/Gruenau: 2× Gold (Mixed 200m, 2000m), 2× Silver (Women 200m, 500m), 1× Bronze (Mixed 500m)

2015

- 4. Common German Championships (DKV/DDV) in Brandenburg: 4× Gold (Mixed 500m, Mixed Small Boat 200m, Women Small Boat 200m, Open Small Boat 200m), 4× Silver (Women Small Boat 500m, Mixed 200m, 2000m, Mixed Small Boat 500m), 4× Bronze (Open 200m, 500m, 2000m, Open Small Boat 500m)
- German long-distance Championships in Zeulenroda-Triebes: 5. Place (mixed 11 km)
- German Indoor-Championships in Minden: 1× Gold, German Champion Mixed

2014

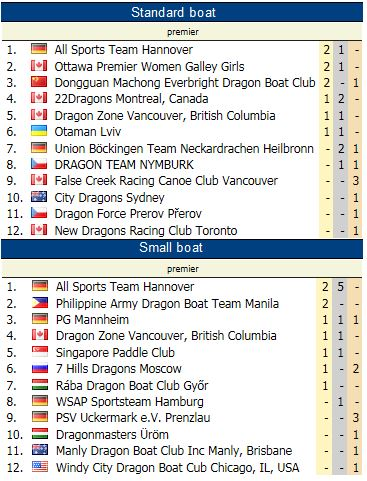
Medal table Premier 9th CCWC in Ravenna

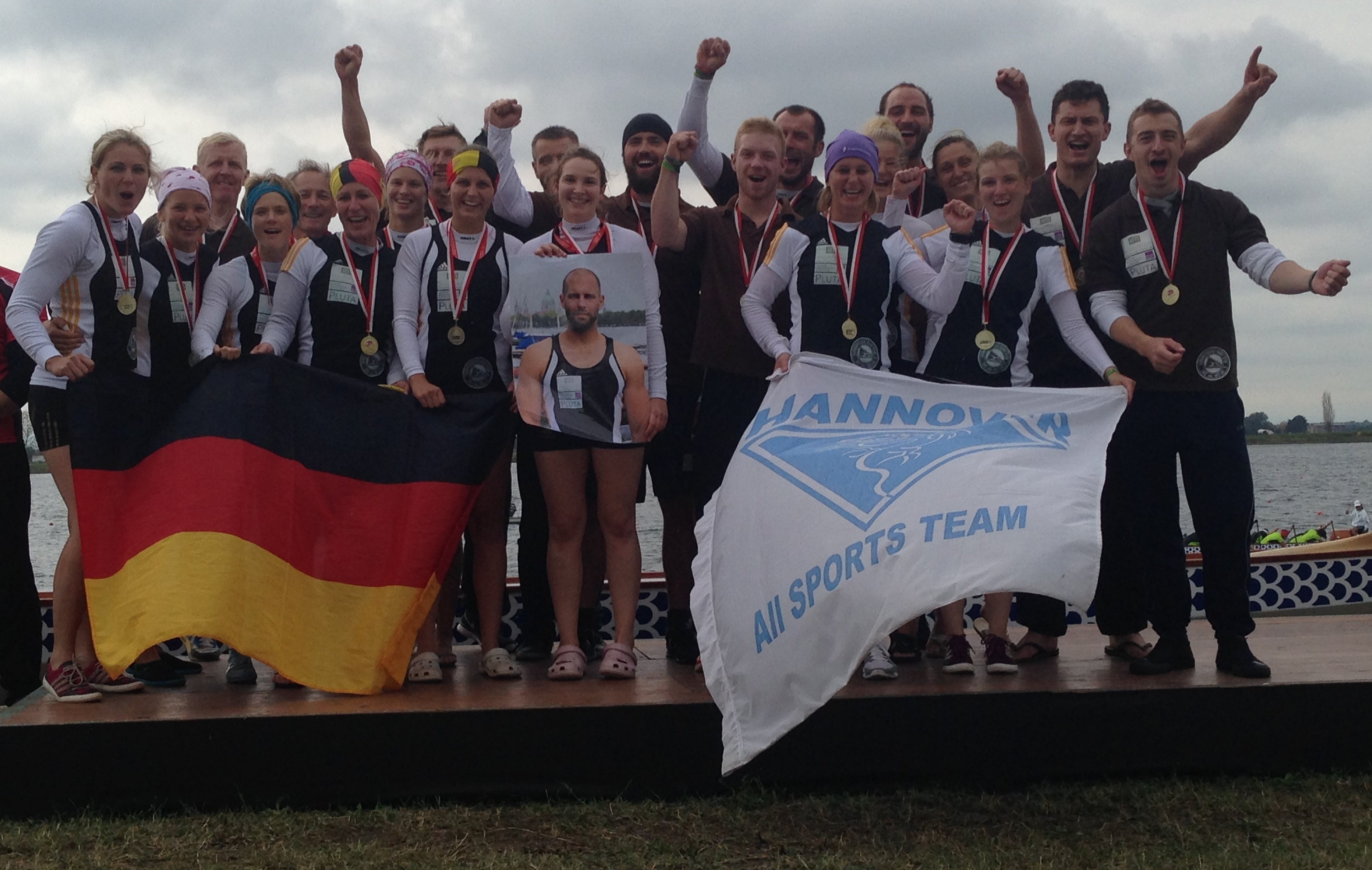
Medal Ceremony Mixed 2000m in Ravenna

- 9th IDBF Club-Crew World Championships in Ravenna/Italy: 4× Gold (Mixed 2000m, 500m, Mixed 200m Small Boat, Women 500m Small Boat), 6× Silver (Women 2000m/200m Small Boat, Open 2000m/200m/500m Small Boat, Mixed 200m)
- German long-distance Championships in Muelheim: 1× Silver (Mixed 12 km)
- German Indoor-Championships in Minden: 1× Gold, German Champion Mixed
- The Hannover All Sports Team becomes "Team of the Year" in Lower Saxony.

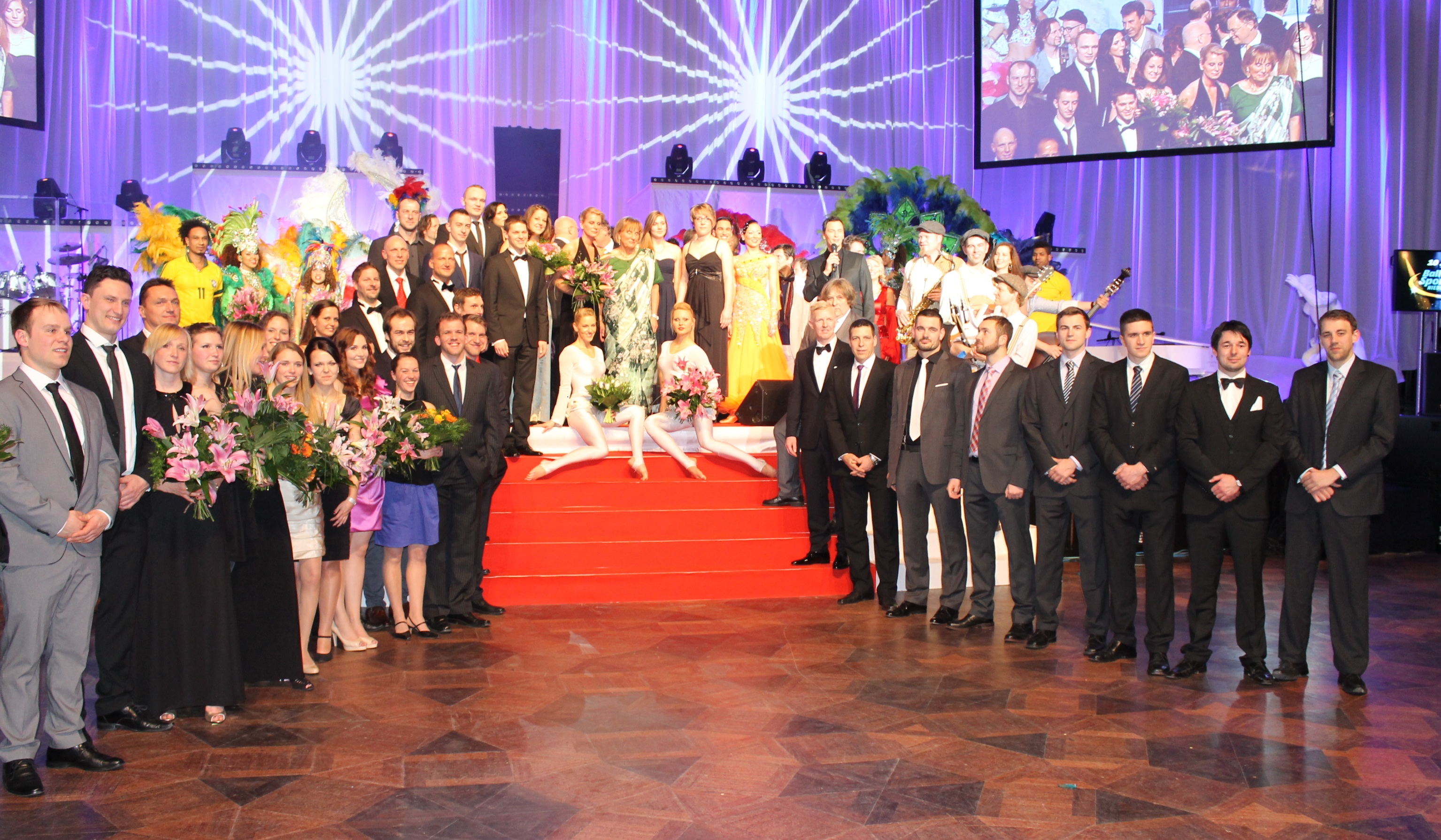
Celebration 2014 in the Kuppelsaal Hannover

- 3. Common German Championships (DKV/DDV) in Schwerin: 6× Gold (Mixed 2000m, 500m, Open 200m, Women Small Boat 500m, Open Small Boat 500m, 200m), 3× Silver (Mixed 200m, Open 2000m, Women Small Boat 200m), 1× Bronze (Open 500m)

2013

- Nomination for "Team of the Year 2013" in Lower Saxony
- 2. Common German Championships (DKV/DDV) in Duisburg: 10× Gold (Mixed 500m, 200m, Open 500m, 200m, Women Small Boat 500m, 200m, Open Small Boat 500m, 200m, Master Open Small Boat 500m, 200m), 2× Silver (Mixed 2000m, Open 2000m)
- EDBF - Club-Crew European Championships in Hamburg, Germany : 6 × Gold (Mixed 2000m, 200m, Open 200m small boat, Women 200m small boat, Open 500m small boat, Women 500m small boat), 1 × Silver (Mixed 500m)
- German long-distance Championships in Schierstein: 1× Silver (Mixed 11 km)
- German Indoor-Championships in Minden: 1× Gold, German Champion Mixed

2012

- 1. Common German Championships in Hamburg/Allermoehe (DDV/DKV): 9 × Gold (Mixed 2000m, 500m, 200m, Open 500m, 200m, Women Small Boat 500m, 200m, Open Small Boat 500m, 200m), 1 × Silver (Open 2000m)
- German Indoor-Championships in Minden: 1× Gold, German Champion Mixed
- German long-distance Championships in Rostock: 1 × Silver (Mixed 12 km)

2011

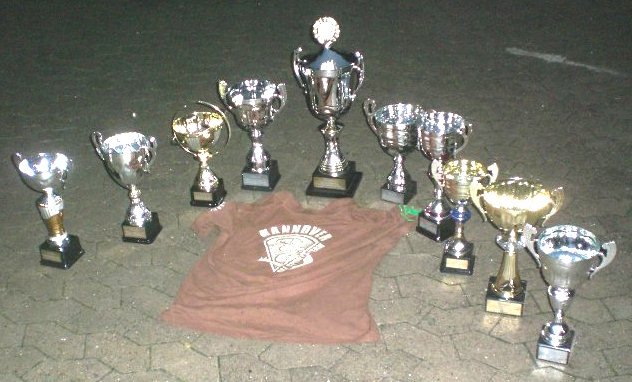
All trophies won at the German Championships 2011 in Brandenburg, including trophy for best team overall

- German Championships in Brandenburg (DKV): 7 × Gold (Mixed 2000m, 500m, 200m, Women Small Boat 500m, 200m, Open Small Boat 500m, 200m), 2 × Silver (Open 500m, 200m)
- World Championships of Nations in Tampa/USA (IDBF), with paddlers of the All Sports Team and as national coach Denis Starke: 1 × Gold (Mixed 500m Small Boat), 1 × Silver (Mixed 1000m), 2 × Bronze (Mixed 500m, 2000m)
- German Championships in Bad Waldsee (DDV): 1 × Gold (Mixed 500m), 2 × Bronze (Mixed 200m, 2000m)
- German Indoor-Championships in Minden: 1 × Bronze Mixed
- German long-distance Championships in Oberhausen: 1 × Gold (Mixed 21 km)

2010

- European Championships of Nations in Amsterdam (EDBF), with paddlers of the All Sports Team and as national coach Denis Starke: 1 × Gold (Mixed 200m), 1 × Silver (Mixed 500m), 1 × Bronze (Mixed 2000m)
- German Championship in Mainz (DDV): 1 × Gold (Mixed 500m), 1 × Silver (Mixed 200m), 3 × Bronze (Mixed 2000m; Open 500m, 2000m)
- German Indoor-Championships in Minden: 1 × Silver Mixed

2009

- 2. Place in Team of the Year in Lower Saxony people's voting
- EDBF - Club-Crew European Championships in Budapest, Hungary : 2 × Gold (Mixed 2000m, 500m), 1 × Bronze (Mixed 200m)
- World Championships of IDBF (International Dragon Boat Federation) of nations in Prague with paddlers of the All Sports Teams and as national coach Denis Starke: 1 × Silver (Mixed 500m), 1 × Bronze (Mixed 200m)
- German Championships in Friedersdorf (DDV): 1 × Gold (Mixed 2000m), 1 × Silver (Mixed 500m)
- German Championships in Munich (DKV): 1 × Gold (Mixed 500m), 2 × Silver (Mixed 200m, 2000m), 1 × Bronze (Open 200m)

2008

- Euro - League Races Frankfurt: 1 × Gold (Mixed 1.000m), 1 × Silver (Mixed 5 × 250m)
- German Championships in Berlin-Gruenau (DKV): 2 × Gold (Mixed 200m, 500m), 3 × Silver (Mixed 2.000m; Open 2.000m, 500m), 1 × Bronze (Open 200m)
- German Championships in Werder (DDV): 1 × Gold (Mixed 2000m), 2 × Silver (Mixed 200m, 460m)

2007

- ICF (International Canoe Federation) - Club-Crew World Championships in Gérardmer, France: 2 × Silver (Mixed 200m, 1.000m)
- German Championships (DKV) in Munich: 3 × Gold (Mixed 200m, 500m; Open 200m), 3 × Silver (Mixed 2000m; Open 500m, 2000m)

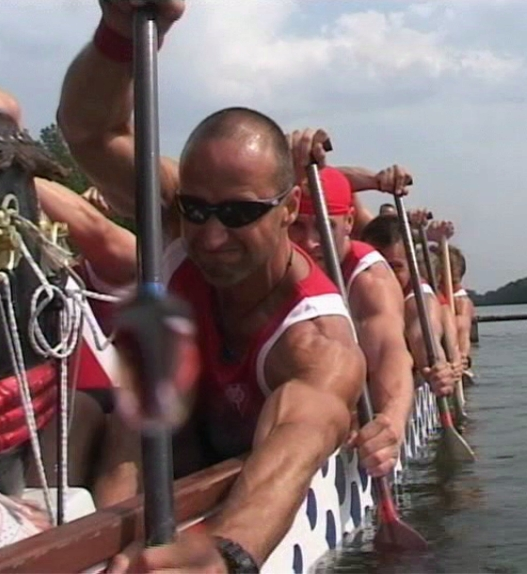
World Games 2005

2006

- ICF - Club Crew European Championships in Poznan, Poland: 1 × Gold (Mixed 2.000m, unofficial championships), 1 × Bronze (Mixed 200m)
- German Championships (DKV) in Brandenburg: 1 × Gold (Mixed 500m), 1 × Silver (Mixed 200m)

2005

- World Games (ICF) in Duisburg - All Sports Team is German Nationalteam 1: 1 × Bronze (Mixed 500m)
- IDBF - World Championships in Berlin - All Sports Team is German Nationalteam: 2 × Bronze (Mixed 200m, 2.000m)
- ICF -Club-Crew World Championships in Schwerin: 1 × Silver (Mixed 250m), 2 × Bronze (Mixed 500m, 2.000m)
- German Championship (DKV) in Duisburg: 1 × Gold (Open 200m), 2 × Silver (Open 500m, 1.000m), 3 × Bronze (Mixed 200m, 500m, 1.000m)

2004

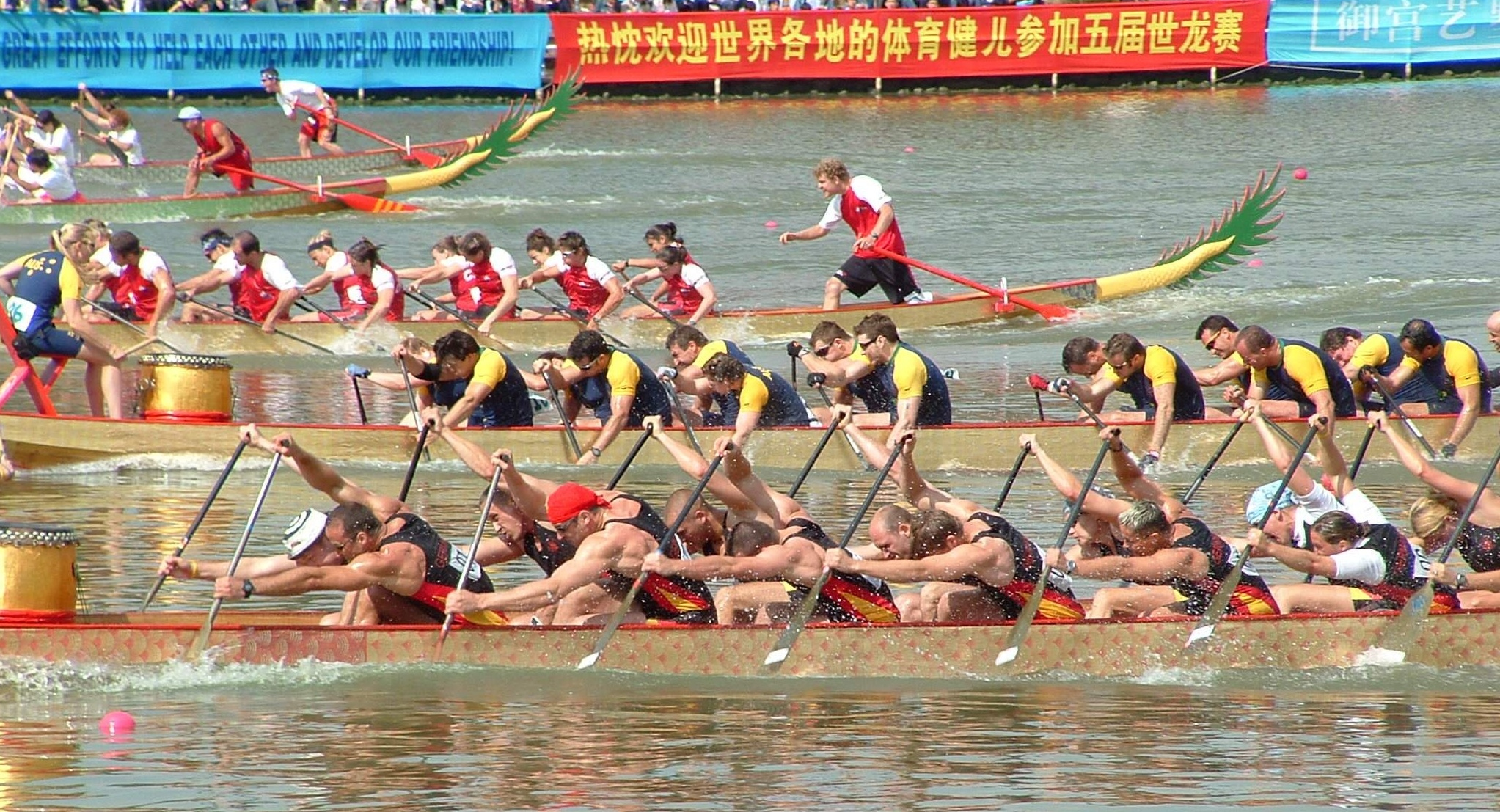
Shanghai 2004, All Sports Team wins Silver

- IDBF - World Championships in Shanghai, China - All Sports Team is German Nationalteam: 1 × Silver (Mixed 200m)
- IDBF - Club-Crew World Championships in Cape Town, South Africa: 2 × 4.place (Mixed 200m, 420m)
- German Championships in Brandenburg (DKV): 3 × Gold (Mixed 250m, 500m, Open 250m), 1 × Silver (Mixed 1.000m), 2 × Bronze (Open 500m, 1.000m)
- German Championships (DDV) in Schwerin: 3 × Gold (Mixed 250m, 500m, 1.000m)

2003

- EDBF -Club Crew European Championships in Auronzo di Cadore/Italy: 2 × Gold (Mixed 250m, 500m), 1 × Silver (Mixed 2.000m)
- German Championships (DDV) in Berlin: 2 × Gold (Mixed 250m, 1.000m), 1 × Silver (Mixed 500m)

2002

- German Championships (DDV) in Schierstein: 2× Silver (Mixed 250m, 1.000m)
- Winner of the DDV – Cup in Mixed and Open Class

2001

- German Championships (DDV) in Munich, first participation on a German Championships: 1 × Silver (Mixed 1.000m), 1 × Bronze (Open 250m)
