= Christoph Meineke =

German politician

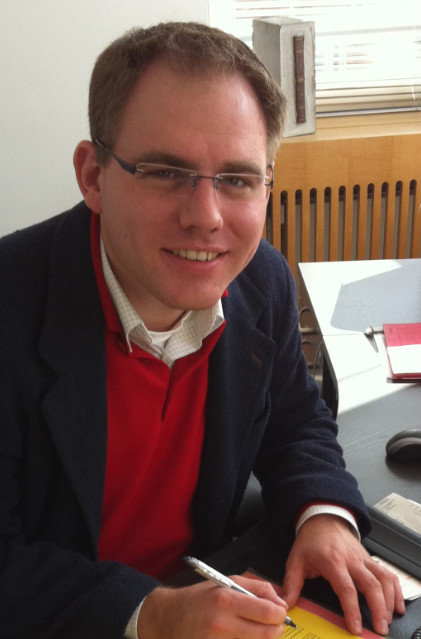
- In office January 1, 2007 – October 31, 2021
- Preceded by: first directly elected mayor

Personal details
- Born: March 13, 1979 (age 47) Hanover, Germany
- Party: Independent
- Education: Vienna University of Economics
- Profession: Economist

Christoph Meineke (born March 13, 1979, in Hanover) is a German non-party politician and since January 2007 the first directly elected strong mayor of the municipality of Wennigsen (Deister).

== Career ==
In September 2006, Meineke became the youngest full-time mayor elected in Germany. Meineke is the first mayor in Northern Germany, who ran for and won a direct election for mayor as an independent candidate without the support of a political party or initiative of voters. His election made headlines on a national level and to this day is used as a reference non-party politics in Germany.

Meineke is a member of the presidium of the League of Cities of Lower Saxony ("Niedersächsischer Städtetag") and of the Innovators Club of the German Association of Cities and Municipalities, and has developed a particular expertise on leveraging technology (such as Web 2.0 capabilities) in local politics. He was also a member of the working committee of the highly renowned Reinhard-Mohn-Price (formerly known as the Carl-Bertelsmann-Price), judging worldwide projects on democracy and participation. He established citizen participation programs in his city and received awards like the first German "Award for Digital Participation" in 2012 or got nominated for the German sustainability award in the category 'Governance and Administration'.

== Background ==
After graduating from the Matthias-Claudius-Gymnasium in Gehrden, Meineke studied economics at the Vienna University of Economics, the University of St. Gallen and the Zeppelin University in Friedrichshafen. He is currently also working toward a doctorate degree in economics under Prof. Birger Priddat at Witten/Herdecke University. In 2012, he completed the Senior Executives in State and Local Government Program at Harvard University's Kennedy School of Government.

== Publications ==
Kommunalwahlkampf 2.0 (Municipal elections 2.0 experiences and tips), in: F.-R. Habbel/A.Huber (Hrsg.): Web 2.0 für Kommunen und Kommunalpolitik, Boizenburg: Verlag Werner Hülsbusch, 2008. (In German)
