= Maschsee =

Artificial lake in Hanover, Germany

Masch Lake
- German: Maschsee
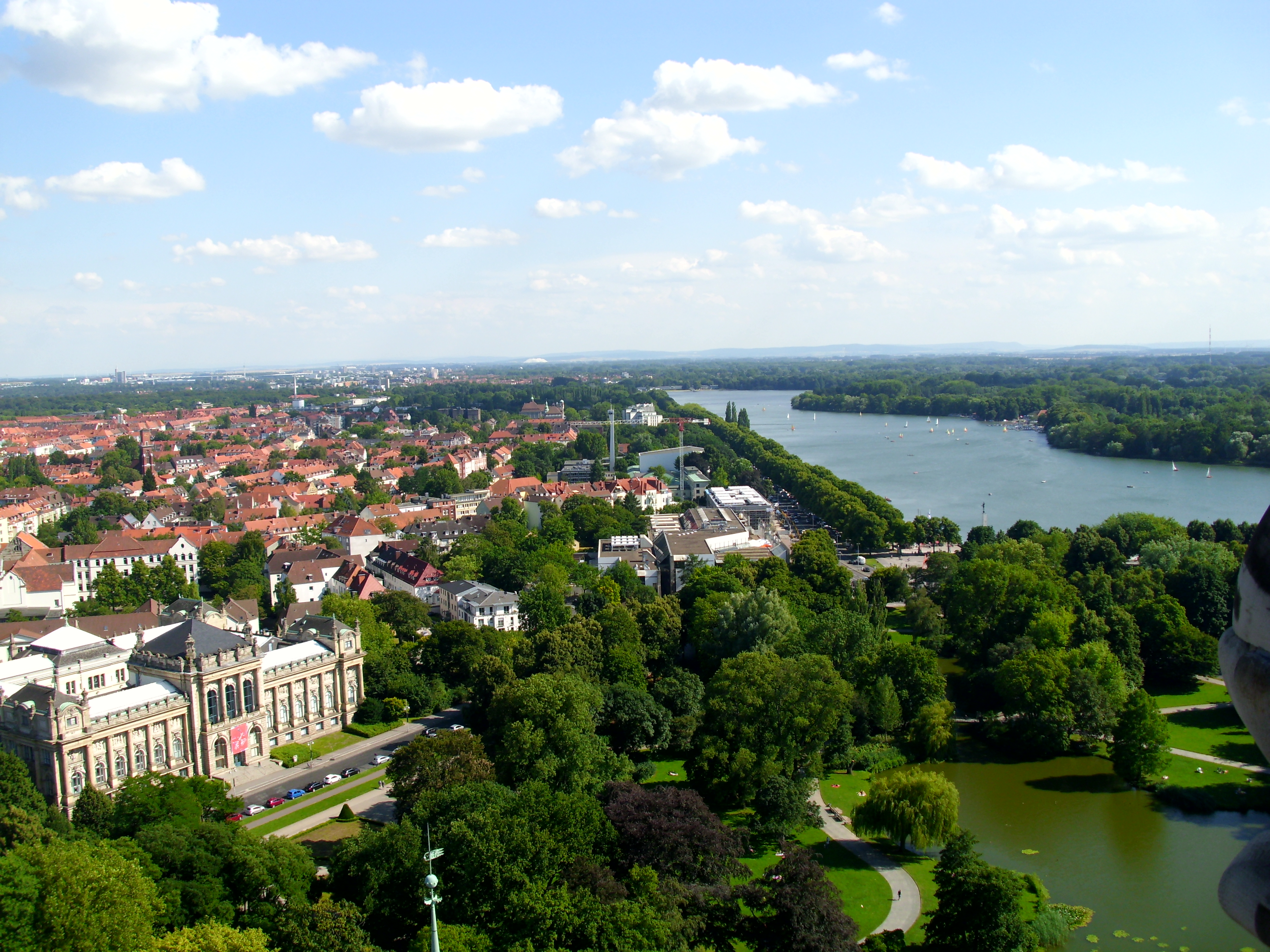
- Masch Lake as seen from the New Town Hall observation platform, about 500 metres (1,600 ft) to its north

- Location within Lower Saxony
- Location: Hanover, Lower Saxony
- Coordinates: 52°21′11″N 9°44′41″E
- Type: Artificial lake
- Basin countries: Germany
- Max. length: c. 2.4 km (1.5 mi)
- Max. width: 530 m (1,740 ft)
- Surface area: 0.78 km^{2} (0.30 sq mi)
- Average depth: c. 2 m (6 ft 7 in)
- Water volume: 1,600,000 m^{3} (1,300 acre⋅ft)
- Surface elevation: 53.20 m (174.5 ft)
- Settlements: Hanover

The Masch Lake (German: Maschsee) is an artificial lake situated south of the city centre of Hanover, the capital of Lower Saxony, Germany. Covering an area of 78 hectares (190 acres), it is the largest body of water within Hanover and a popular recreation area as well as venue for numerous water sports.

== Name ==
The name of the lake stems from the so-called Leinemarsch, or simply Marsch, meaning 'swamp'. This is the historical description for the area in which the lake was built, that was in a deep-lying floodplain of the Leine river.

== Construction ==
=== Design ===
Creating a lake in the wide river valley of the Leine river near Hanover was first considered during the late 19th century. This tied in with the by-then necessary dyking of the Leine and Ihme rivers, which would regularly flood the city after snow melted in the Harz mountains in spring. The creation of a lake could reduce the threat of high water levels and put the Leine's river valley area to better use.

Over the course of the following decades different designs emerged, from small to large, such as situating a shooting range (Schützenplatz) on an island within the lake. In September 1925, the newly elected city mayor Arthur Menge commissioned Otto Franzius, a water engineer and professor at the Hanover Technical College (now Leibniz University Hannover), to work out the details of the construction of a lake together with the city's building authorities. Franzius was to be responsible for the designing of the hydro-engineering and hydrological elements of the project, while the city authorities, led by Karl Elkart, would handle the urban development aspects.

In contrast to the original idea that the lake be dug down into swamp land and then be supplied with water from the Leine, a new proposal emerged to build the Maschsee above the swamp in a bowl-like structure – raising it higher than the water level of the Leine – and having it be filled using a system of water pumps. This would eradicate the potential problem of accumulating mud through flood waters.

Franzius created a final design that proved both effective and financially acceptable, whereupon the city authorities provided a grant of 14,000 Reichsmarks in January 1926 toward attempts to seal the basin of the proposed lake.

Despite the plans being completed it nevertheless took roughly eight years until the beginning of the 1930s for work to commence. The three main factors behind the creation of an artificial lake in the Leine river valley were:

- The embankment of the Ihme flood channel
- The creation of a local recreation area close to the city that provided the opportunity for water sports
- The elimination of high unemployment levels (which in 1932 was 58,000 Hanoverians) through programmes of public works

One factor against construction of the lake was the nearly 20-metre-high (66 ft) Bismarck Tower that stood in the centre of the proposed water feature. Here, paramilitary marches took place, and it was the site of a book burning in 1933. The landmark was eventually demolished in 1935 during the course of the lake's construction.

=== Job creation ===
In the 1930s, the era of the Great Depression, the city of Hanover lacked the necessary finances to commence the Masch Lake project, even though the project had already been planned at the time for some ten years. The project was favourable for the Nazi Party that came to power in January 1933 as it would help reduce unemployment levels, which was a central theme of their propaganda. On 28 November 1933 the project was approved at a meeting of the city council.

On 21 March 1934 the first ground was broken in the Leine swamp. Despite the unsettled financing of the project, it provided many people with work. Driven by the harshness of the economic situation of the time, they took on tough working conditions and low pay which was barely above unemployment support.

During construction, 14 locomotive trains with 365 tipping wagons were used along a 15-kilometre (9.3 mi) track, as well as diggers and 5 crawler tractors. Many workers though had to supply their own tools. Initially there were 100 people working on the project, but by completion 1,650 people had been involved in the excavation of roughly 780,000 square metres (8,400,000 sq ft) of earth to create the lake basin.

With the Masch Lake project fully completed by early 1936, the official opening took place on 21 May 1936. Hundreds of thousands of Hanoverians and guests looked on from the edge of the lake as the event began with the then-typical trooping of the Nazi Party. In addition some 6,000 sporting persons took part in a rally along with the armed forces and public officials.

Just a few years later, during World War II, the lake was covered up with canvasses and fake landscapes created on floating islands in an attempt to confuse Allied bomber pilots regarding their whereabouts during air raids on Hanover.

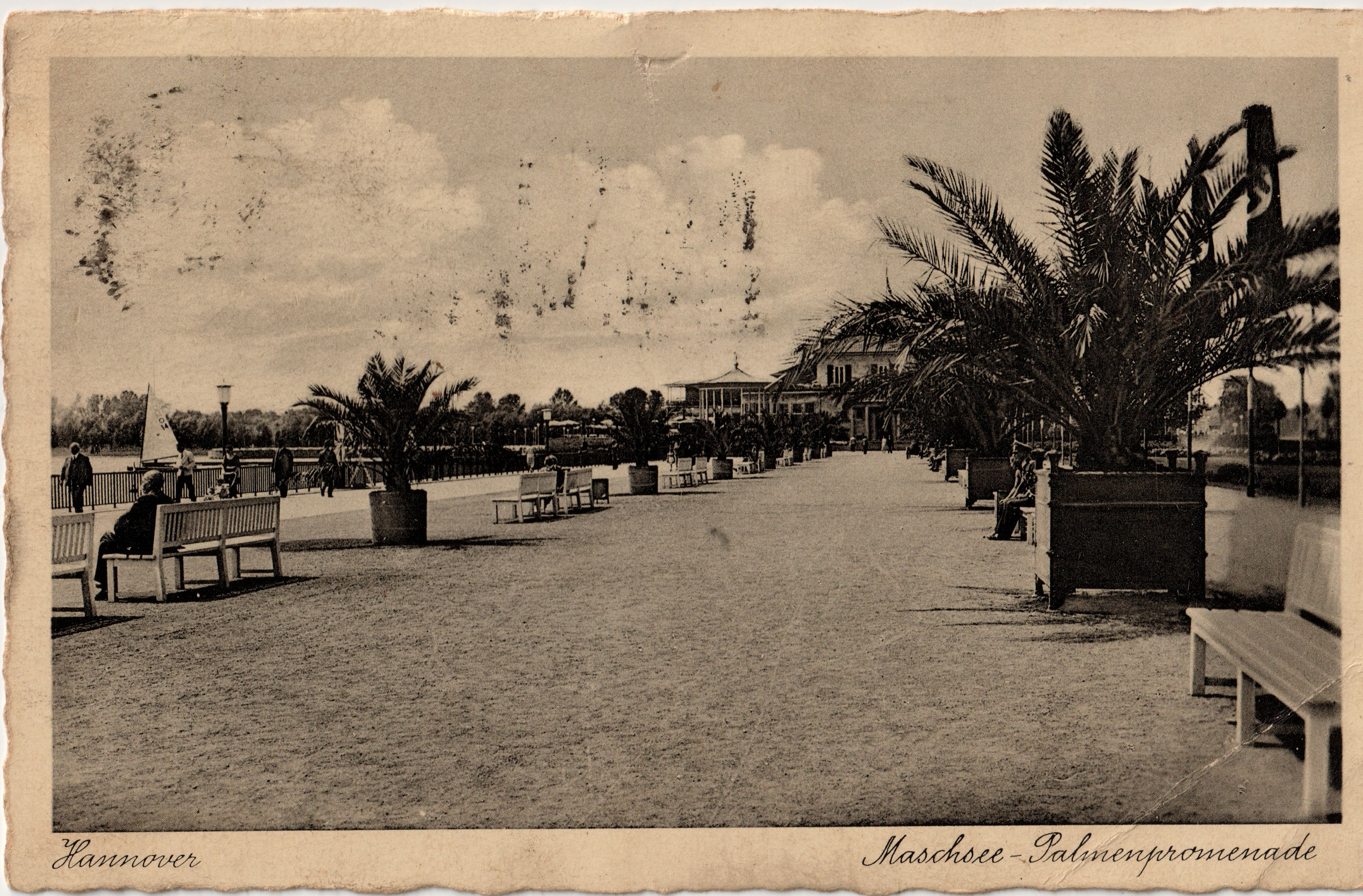
Machsee promenade, about 1937

== Water supply ==
The water level loses a maximum of 1.3 centimetres (0.51 in) per day through evaporation and water seepage, which equates to 10,000 cubic metres (350,000 cu ft) of water. In order to maintain a constant level, a pump station at a series of ponds in Ricklingen provides the Masch Lake with a water supply. Its three pumps send water along an 800-metre-long (2,600 ft) pipe to the "source" of the Masch Lake. Depending on weather conditions, between 1–2 million cubic metres (35–71 million cubic feet) of water are required per year. From November until February no pumping is carried out, so the water level sinks on average 45 centimetres (18 in) during this time.

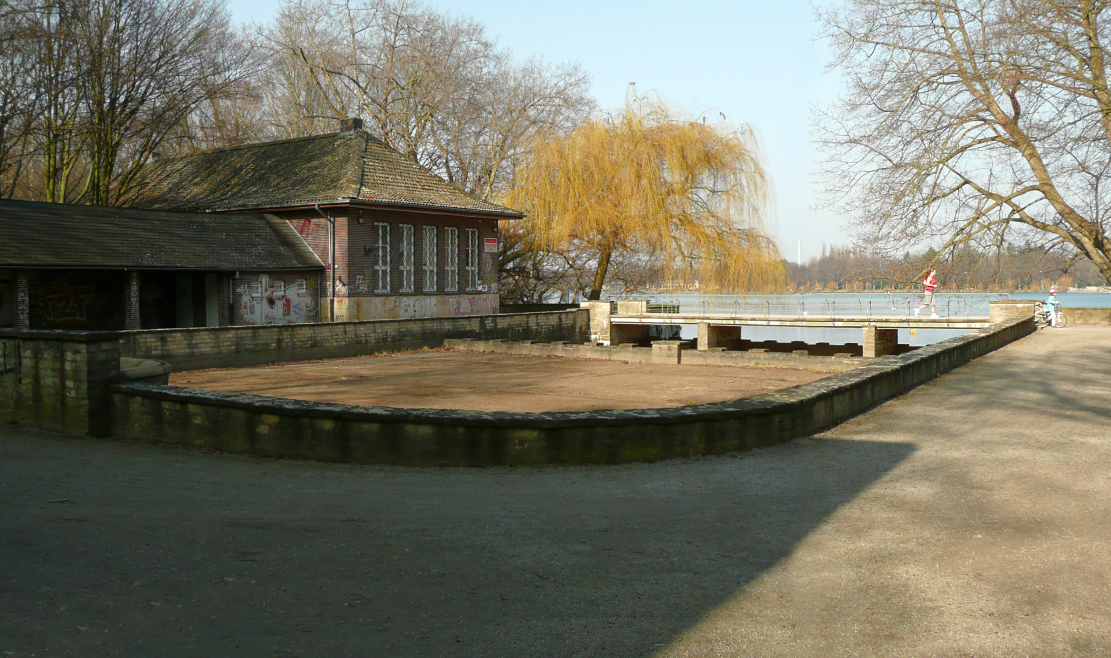
The "source" of the Masch Lake, with empty water basin

Until 1960, the water level of the Masch Lake was supplied by the Masch Lake Source pump station. Its pumping and filtering houses were one of the first building projects at the site of the lake to be put into operation in November 1935. The plant is equipped with two pumps which are capable of raising 500 litres (130 US gal) of water every second from the Leine.

As the Leine is strongly contaminated with suspended sediment, the usage of this water supply meant that the Masch Lake quickly began to silt up. In 1960, the Hanover city administration therefore decided to build a new pump station at the Ricklingen Ponds, in order to supply the lake with groundwater.

The old pumping house is only used today when the oxygen content of the water is too low, as this water is supplied to the lake through an open-air three-stage cascading system that raises oxygen levels. It is also put into use during the Masch Lake Festival.

Today the old pumping house is used as a club house by the Hanover Sport Club.

== Leisure activities ==
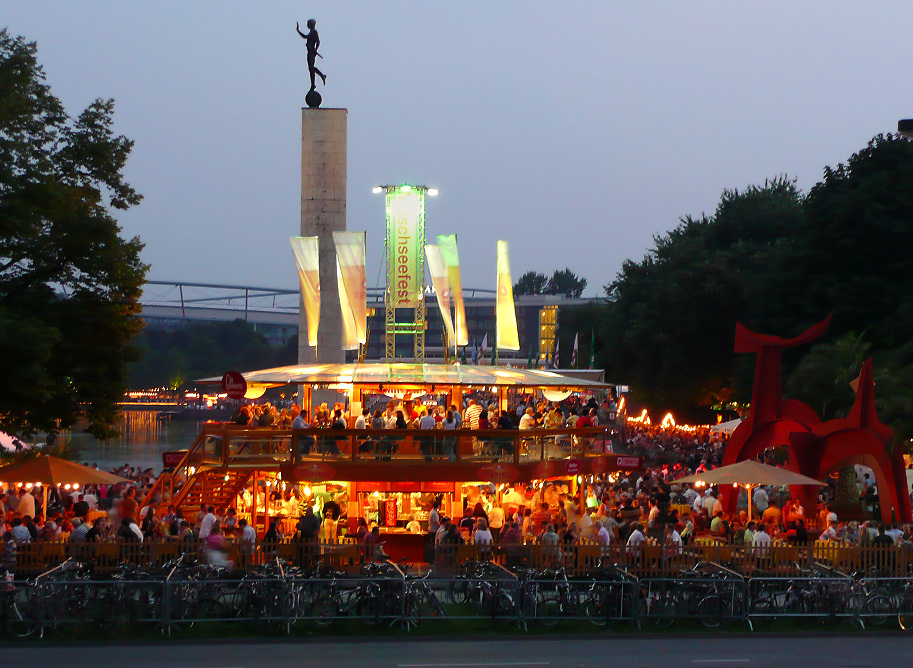
The annual Masch Lake Festival.

=== Masch Lake Festival ===
In summer the Masch Lake Festival (Maschseefest) is held over several weeks beside the lake, which draws around two million visitors annually. The event was first staged in 1986 to commemorate the 50th anniversary of the lake's opening. It features musical performances, cabaret, cuisine and firework displays.

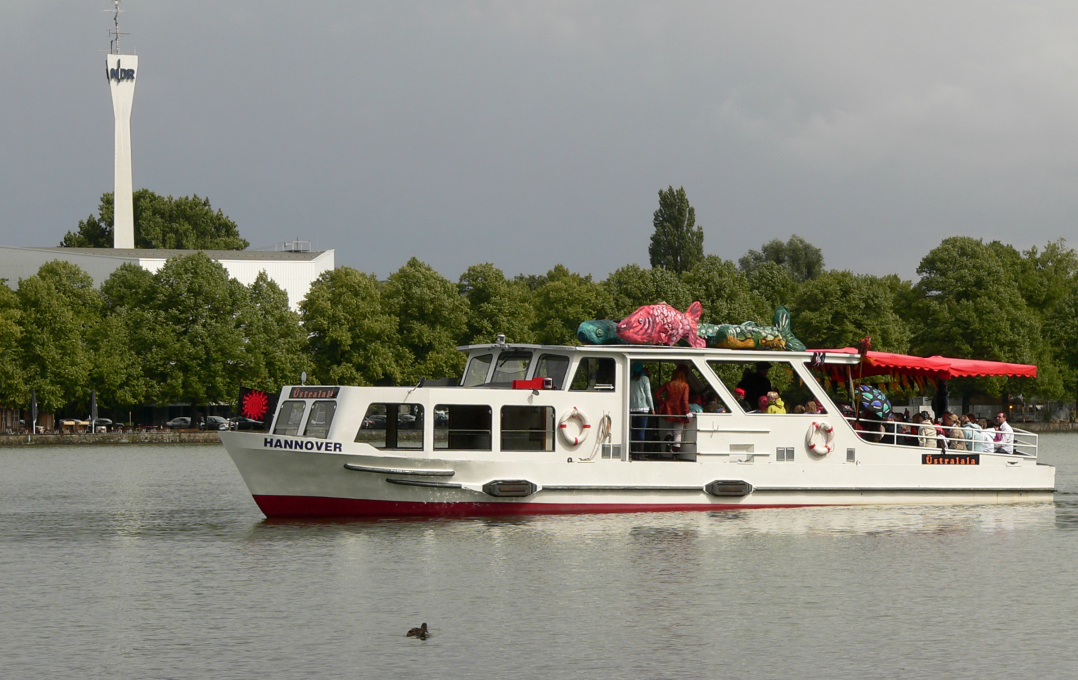
A boat operated by üstra during the festival.

=== Boats and ships ===
During the summer months the Hanoverian transport company üstra operates boat trips on the lake using electrically powered vessels. Surrounding the Masch Lake are numerous clubs for water sports (most popularly, rowing and sailing). During the year many diverse competitions are held on the lake, including the annual European Dragon Boat Race.

Between 1952 and 1989 motor boat competitions were regularly staged on the lake, which saw four world championships contested and ten European champions crowned.

=== Bathing ===
The Masch Lake Beach lies at the southern point of the lake. In 2005, the city handed over the former city open air pool to a private investor who began construction on a commercial wellness park that stalled before being taken over by investor group Aspria in 2007.

In spring 2009 Aspria Hannover opened a private spa and sport club in the buildings of the old public facilities and some newly built premises. Aspria also took over the running of the public bathing area, although since 2009 over half of the bathing area has been accessible to members of the private Aspria club only.

=== Exercising ===
With its proximity to the centre of Hanover, the Masch Lake is a popular recreation area for the city's walkers and joggers. In 2005, a 6-kilometre-long (3.7 mi) route around the lake was mapped out by the German Athletics Association. This track runs along the footpath, closer to the water than the asphalt-coated cycle path. Since 2003 the cycle path has also been open for roller skating usage.

=== Ice activities ===
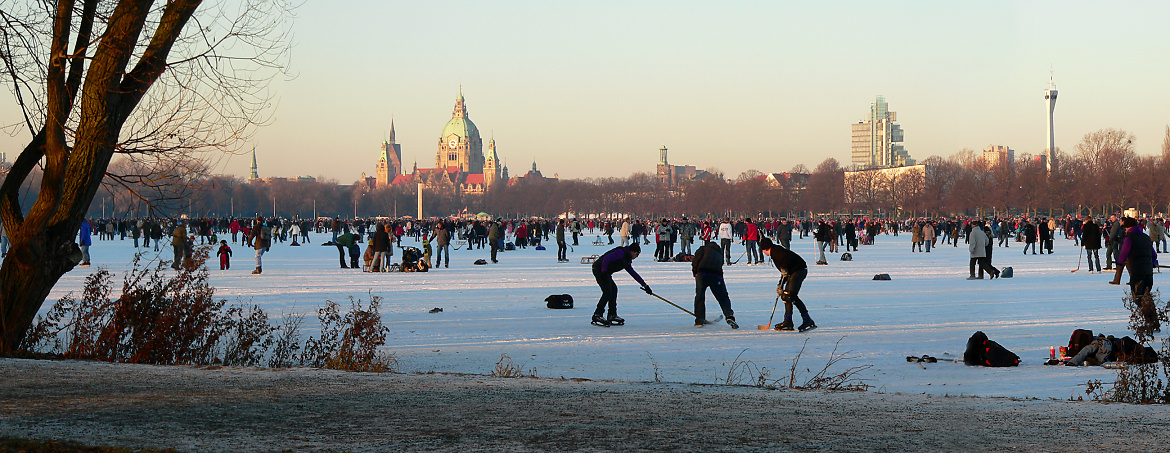
Ice hockey on the frozen Masch Lake.

If the lake freezes in winter and the thickness of the ice exceeds 13 centimetres (5.1 in), the city authorities hoist a flag at the northern shore of the lake to indicate that it is permitted to go onto the ice. In periods of constant cold weather the lake can draw more than 10,000 visitors a day for activities such as ice skating and ice hockey. When ice thickness reaches 20 centimetres (7.9 in), as it did in 2003, stalls may also be erected on the ice.

== Art works ==
Notable works of art on the northern side of the lake are the 6-metre-high (20 ft) red steel Hellebardier (meaning 'Halberdier') sculpture by Alexander Calder (1972) as well as the bronze Olympic torchbearer that stands atop an 18.5-metre-high (61 ft) stone column and 'Putto on the Fish' that were both created in 1936 by Hermann Scheuernstuhl.

Other sculptures on the eastern side are the Menschenpaar (meaning 'Human Couple') by Georg Kolbe (1936–37) and two lion sculptures created by Arno Breker (1938). In 1948 Erich Haberland unveiled his piece 'The Swimmer', which stands in the public bathing area.

Spanish artist Santiago Sierra caused a sensation in 2005 when he remembered the fact that the Masch Lake was built through a Nazi work programme by installing a walk-in room filled with mud at the Kestner Society Art Gallery.

A light art project was held around the lake at the start of 2009 under the title 'New Moon on the Lake'. The display consisted of 22 illuminated pieces that had been created by international artists, which formed the opening of the 2009 Garden Project in Hanover.

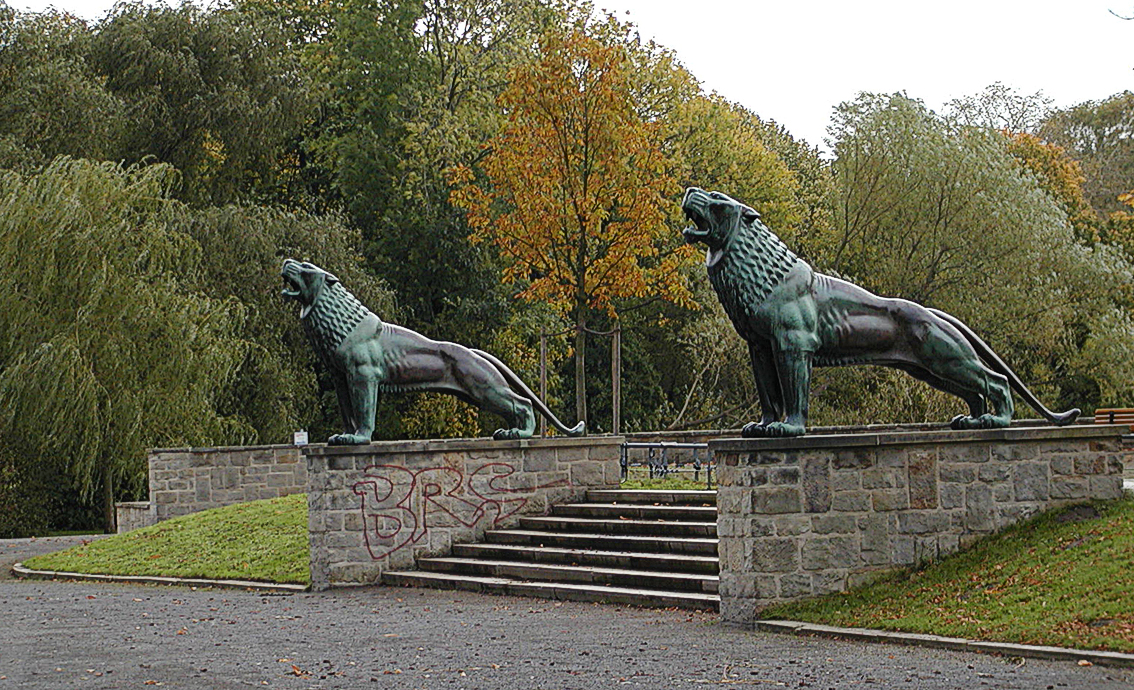
'The Lion Bastion' by Arno Breker

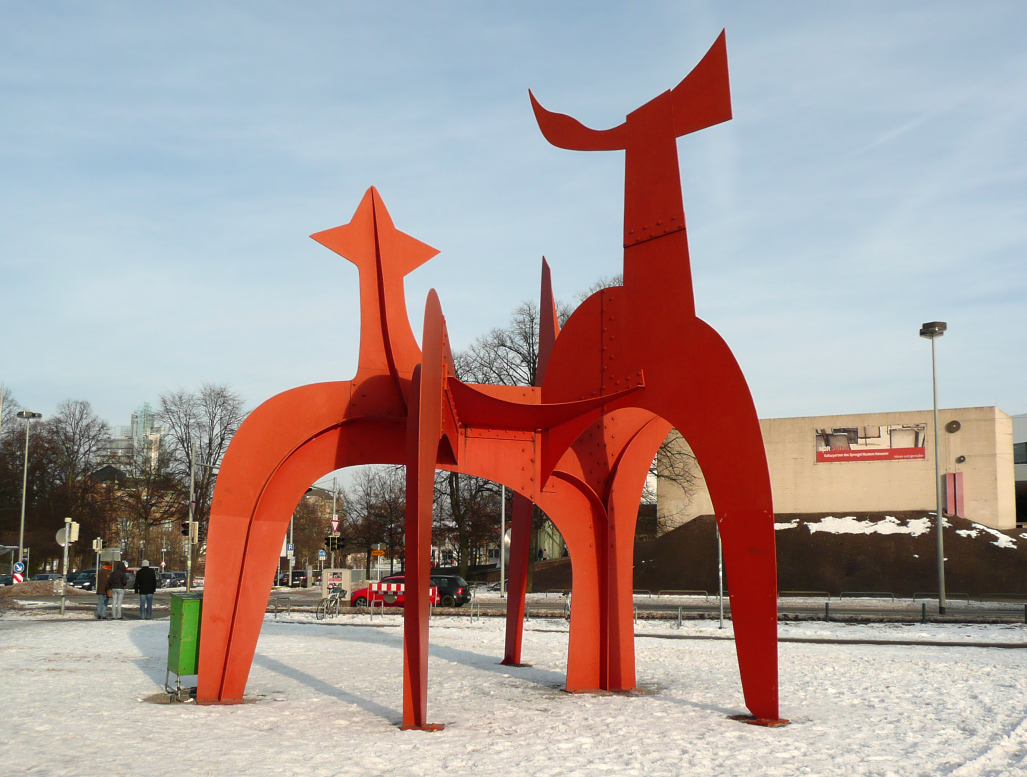
Hellebardier by Alexander Calder

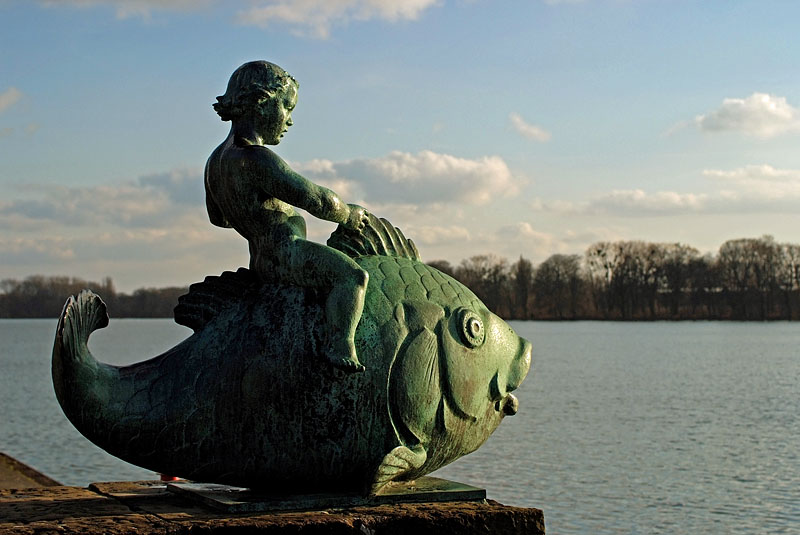
'Cherub on the Fish' by Hermann Scheuernstuhl

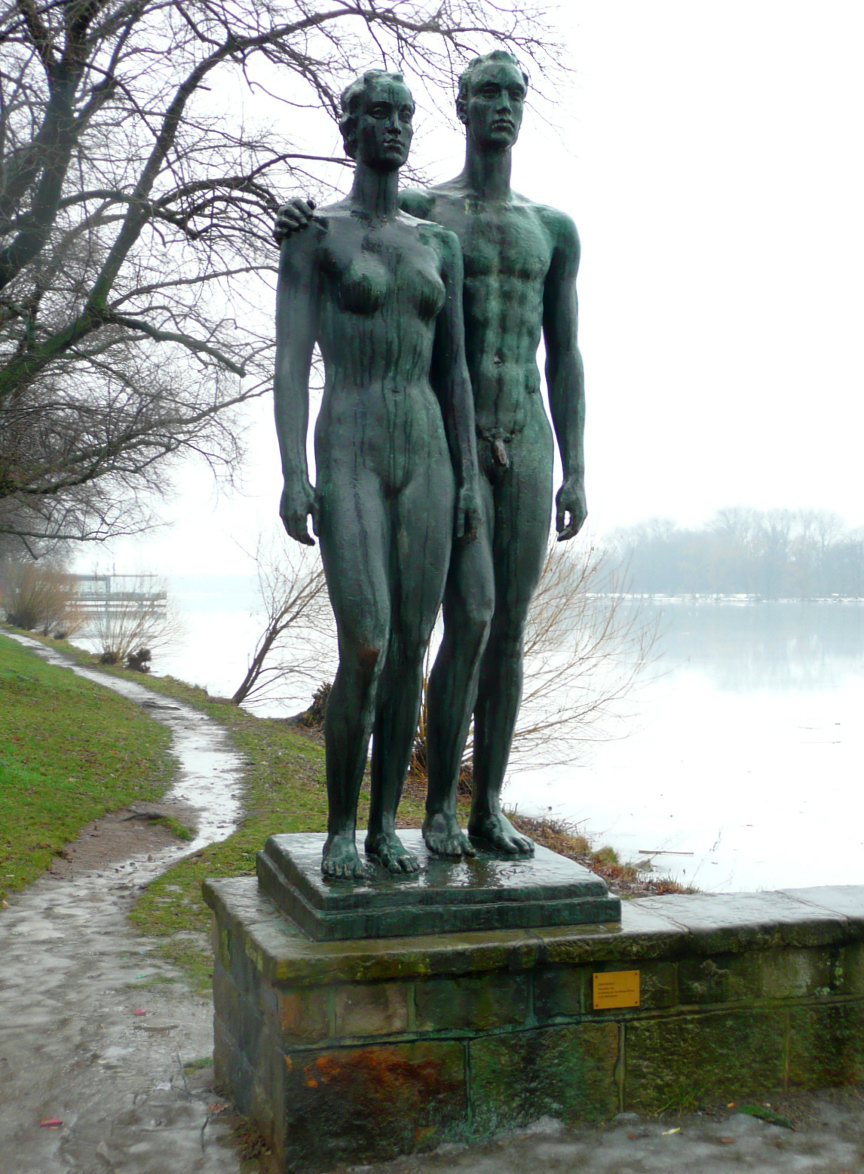
Menschenpaar by Georg Kolbe

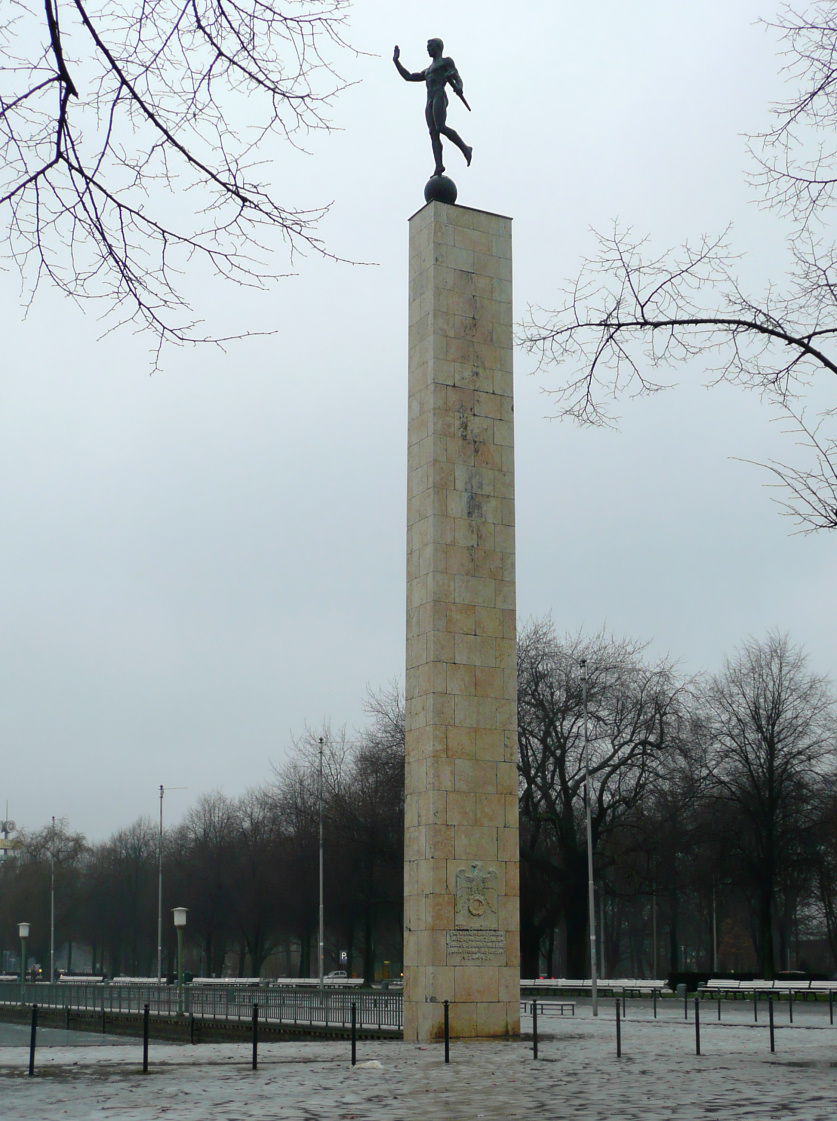
The Olympic torchbearer column

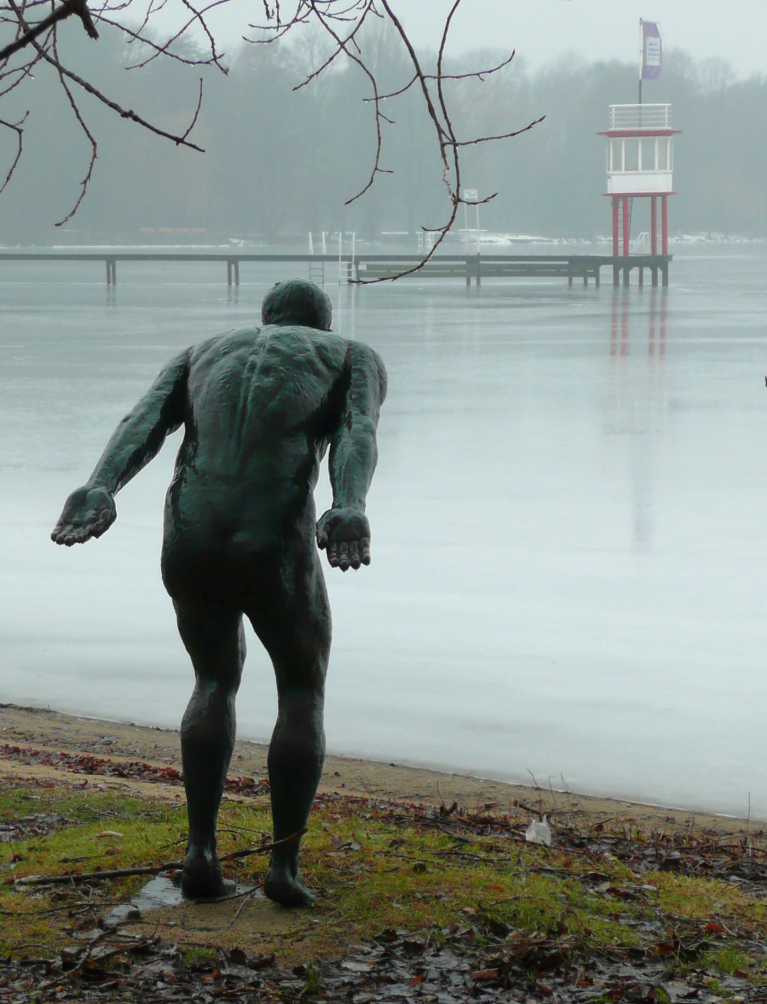
'The Swimmer' by Erich Haberland

== Accessibility ==
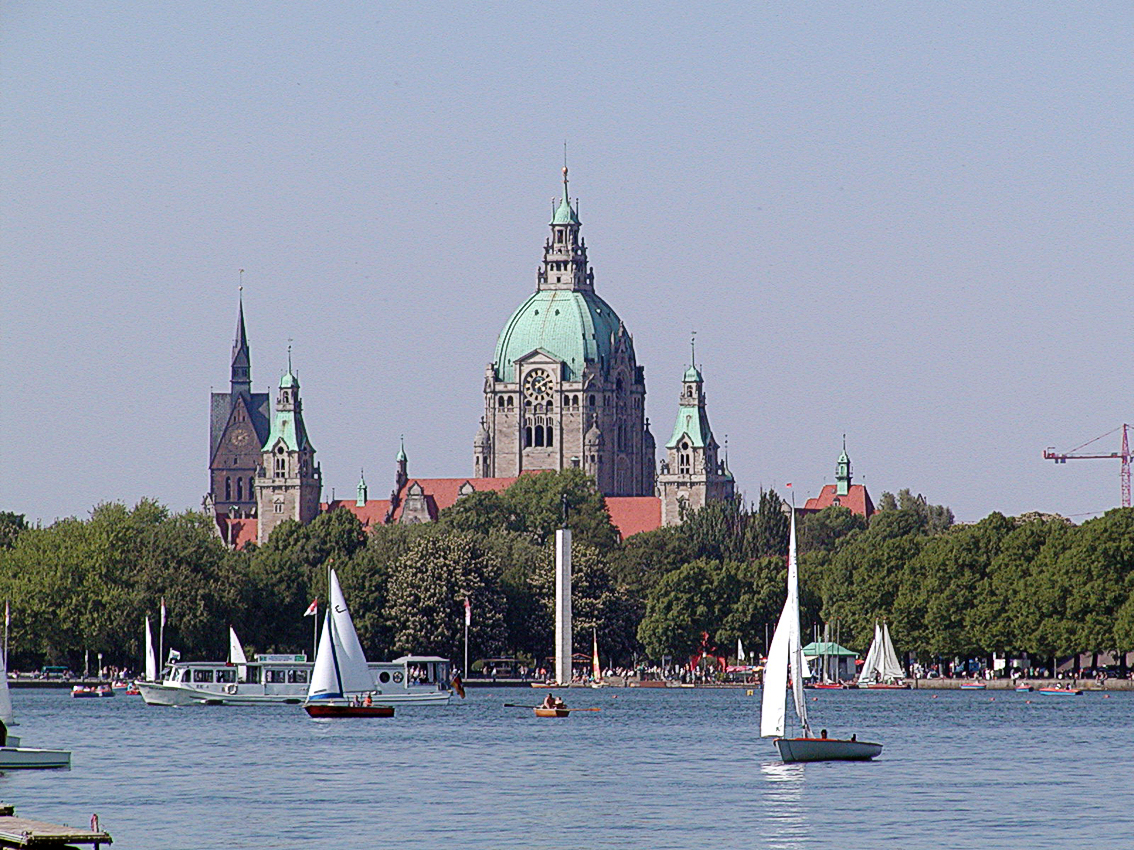
Hanover's New Town Hall lies close to the Masch Lake.

The Masch Lake lies close to other notable places, such as the New Town Hall, the Lower Saxon State Museum Hanover, the Sprengel Museum, the Lower Saxon Stadium (home of the football club Hannover 96), the main city indoor swimming pool as well as the Lower Saxon broadcasting houses of television channels NDR and ZDF.

The lake is directly accessible by using the bus stops at the Lower Saxon Stadium and the Sprengel Museum. Additional bus and tram stops such as the Aegidientorplatz, Schlägerstraße, Geibelstraße, Altenbekener Damm and Döhren Tower also lie in relatively close proximity to the lake.

Numerous foot and cycle paths lead to the Masch Lake and follow along its shoreline. The western side of the lake, where the club houses of numerous water sport clubs are situated, is only accessible by foot or cycle as vehicles are not permitted without official permission.

== General references ==
- Press Office, City of Hanover (1936). Maschsee Hannover - Zu seiner Eröffnung am 21. Mai 1936 (in German). Hanover.
- Roehrbein, Waldemar R. (1986). Der Maschsee in Hannover: Seine Entstehung und Geschichte (in German). Hanover: Schlüter. ISBN 3-87706-046-3.
- Fisch, Fabian (1998). Rund um den Maschsee (in German). Hanover: Fackelträger. ISBN 3-7716-2121-6.
- Schwarz, Henrike (2000). Der Maschsee (in German). Hanover: Grünflächenamt. ISBN 3-7716-2121-6.
