= Hans-Georg Wenzel =

German geodesist and academic (1945–1999)

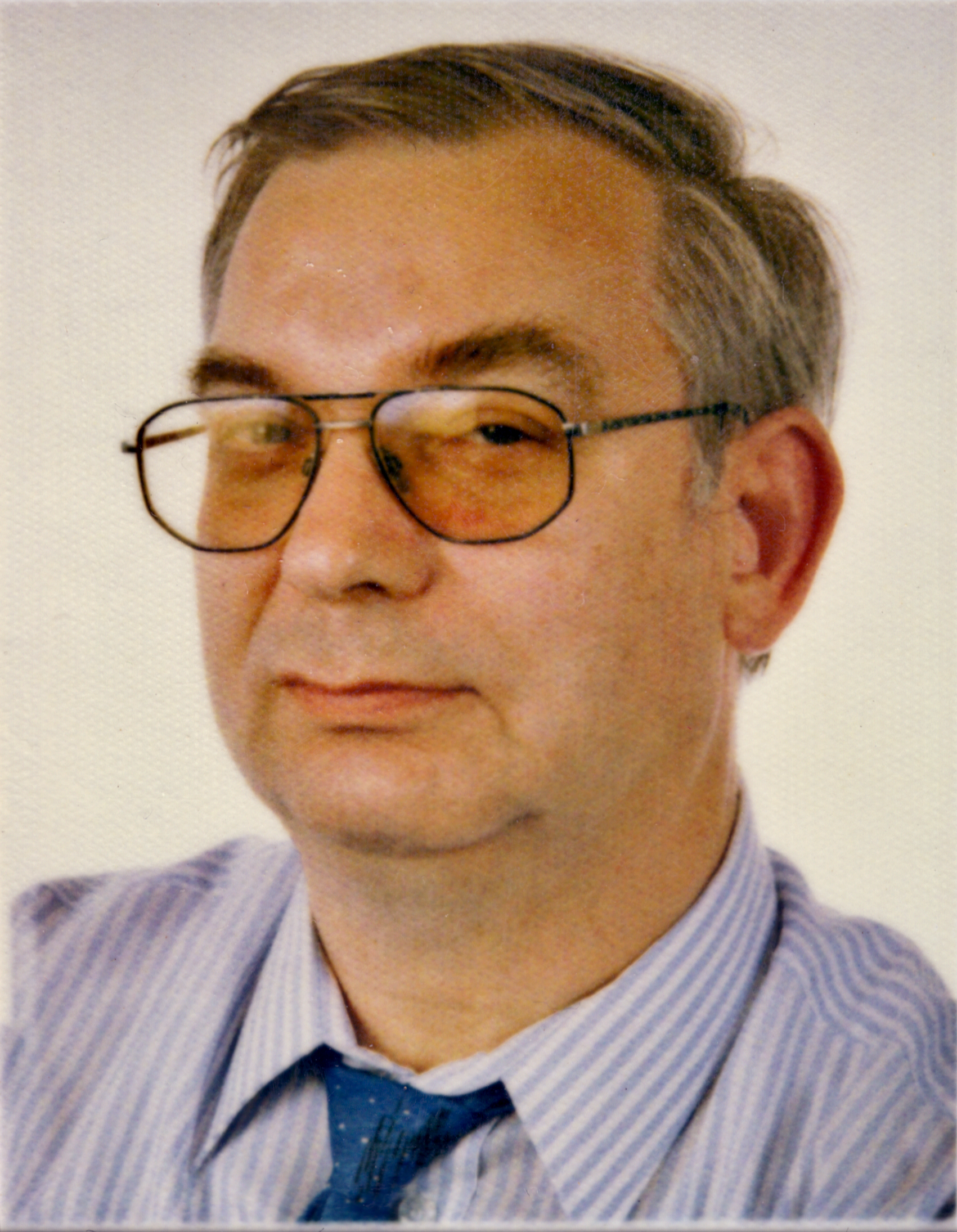
Hans-Georg Wenzel 1998

Hans-Georg Wenzel (3 February 1945 – 11 November 1999), also known as George Wenzel, was a German geodesist, geophysicist and university lecturer. His most important field of work was physical geodesy, where he worked after his dissertation on earth tides with geophysical measurements up to global models of the earth gravity field.

== Life and career ==
Hans-Georg Wenzel was born on 3 February 1945 in Hahnenklee-Bockswiese. From 1962 to 1964 Wenzel trained as a surveying technician. Until 1967 he studied surveying at the Staatliche Ingenieurschule für Bauwesen in Essen and at the Technische Hochschule Hannover, which he graduated in 1972 with a Dipl.-Ing. degree. He then worked at the Institute for Geodesy at Leibniz University Hannover, first as a scientific assistant, later as a scientific assistant, chief engineer and finally as an academic councilor. In 1985 he habilitated with his thesis "High Resolution Spherical Harmonic Models for the Gravitational Potential of the Earth" (Hochauflösende Kugelfunktionsmodelle für das Gravitationspotential der Erde). In 1988 he was appointed Professor of Gravimetry and Geodynamics at the Geodetic Institute of the University of Karlsruhe and Director of the Geophysical Observatory in Schiltach in the Black Forest. Since 1987, Wenzel has been a member of the board of the International Association of Geodesy (IAG), whose sections he chaired from 1991 to 1995 and from 1995 to 1999 as president of the Earth Tide Commission (ETC) of the IAG. From 1987 to 1995 he also served on the boards of the International Gravimetric Bureau and, since 1996, the Federation of the Astronomical and Geophysical Data and Analysis Services. On 1 March, 1999, Wenzel was appointed to succeed Wolfgang Torge as professor at the University of Hannover. Shortly after his appointment he left life unexpectedly in November 1999 in Wennigsen.

== Honours ==
For many years Wenzel was well known in geodesy, especially for his groundbreaking spherical harmonic models. They made an important contribution to geophysics and geodynamics, but also to regional and global geoid determination. In his research career, Wenzel published more than 150 publications on global tidal research, gravity field research and geodynamics. In May 2000, the Earth Tide Commission awarded Hans-Georg Wenzel the ETC Medal Award posthumously.

== Selected Publication ==
- Wenzel, Hans-Georg (1976). Zur Genauigkeit von gravimetrischen Erdgezeitenbeobachtungen (PhD thesis) (in German). Hannover: Lehrstühle für Geodäsie, Photogrammetrie und Kartographie an der Technischen Universität Hannover.
- Wenzel, Hans-Georg; Franz, Monka; Torge, Wolfgang; Weber, Georg (1978). Gravimetric, altimetric and astrogeodetic geoid determinations in the North Sea region. Hannover: Lehrstühle für Geodäsie, Photogrammetrie und Kartographie an der Technischen Universität Hannover. (Report on the results of the SEASAT-A-Nordsee-Projekt excursion).
- Wenzel, Hans-Georg; Torge, Wolfgang (1978). Deutsche Geodätische Kommission bei der Bayerischen Akademie der Wissenschaften (ed.). "Dreidimensionale Ausgleichung des Testnetzes Westharz". Angewandte Geodäsie, Reihe B (in German). 234. Munich: Beck. ISBN 3-7696-8532-6.
- Wenzel, Hans-Georg (1978). "Gravimetric vertical deflection determination for the North Sea region. (GVDNS 1)". Angewandte Geodäsie, Reihe B. 235. ISBN 3-7696-8533-4.
- Wenzel, Hans-Georg; Franz, Monka; Torge, Wolfgang; Weber, Georg (1979). Improved Vertical Deflection and Geoid Determination in the North Sea Region. Hannover: Lehrstühle für Geodäsie, Photogrammetrie und Kartographie an der Technischen Universität Hannover.
- Wenzel, Hans-Georg; Torge, Wolfgang; Weber, Georg (1980). Deutsche Geodätische Kommission bei der Bayerischen Akademie der Wissenschaften (ed.). "Determination of 12' [twelve minutes] × 20' [twenty minutes] mean free air gravity: anomalies for the North Sea region". Angewandte Geodäsie, Reihe B. Munich: Beck. ISBN 3-7696-8541-5..
- Wenzel, Hans-Georg; Kanngieser, Erich; Kummer, K.; Torge, Wolfgang (1983). Das Gravimeter–Eichsystem Hannover (in German). Vol. 120. Hannover: Fachrichtung Vermessungswesen der Universität Hannover.
- Wenzel, Hans-Georg (1985). Hochauflösende Kugelfunktionsmodelle für das Gravitationspotential der Erde. Wissenschaftliche Arbeiten der Fachrichtung Vermessungswesen der Universität Hannover (Prof thesis) (in German). Vol. 137.
- Hartmann, Thorsten; Wenzel, Hans-Georg (1 September 1994). "The harmonic development of the Earth tide generating potential due to the direct effect of the planets". Geophysical Research Letters. 21 (18): 1991–1993. doi:10.1029/94GL01684.
- Hartmann, Thorsten; Wenzel, Hans-Georg (15 December 1995). "The HW95 tidal potential catalogue". Geophysical Research Letters. 22 (24): 3553–3556. doi:10.1029/95GL03324.
- Wenzel, Hans-Georg (27 August 1997). "The NANOGAL Software: Earth Tide Data Processing Package ETERNA 3.30". St Louis University.
- Wenzel, Hans-Georg; Denker, Heiner; Torge, Wolfgang; Ihne, J.; Schirmer, U. (1999). "Investigation of Different Methods for the Combination of Gravity and GPS-Levelling Data". In Schwarz, K. P. (ed.). Geodesy beyond 2000 - The Challenges of the First Decade, IAG Symposia. Vol. 121. Berlin/Heidelberg/New York: Springer. pp. 137 ff. ISBN 3-540-67002-5.

=== Editorials ===
- Wenzel, Hans-Georg; Zink, Wolfgang (1997). Geodäsie - Technik für Raum und Recht: Kongreßdokumentation der Fachvorträge / 81. Deutscher Geodätentag 1997 in Karlsruhe. Stuttgart: Wittwer. ISBN 3-87919-254-5.

== Sources ==
- Torge, Wolfgang (2000). "In memoriam Prof. Dr.-Ing. Hans-Georg Wenzel". Zeitschrift für Vermessungswesen. 125: 112–113. ISSN 0340-4560.
