= Hybrid Exit =

Dragon boat racing technique

The Hybrid Exit is a special move to take the paddle out of the water in dragon boat racing sport. It was initially developed and trained in Canada.

== Execution ==
In Germany the Hybrid Exit is being executed by the All Sports Team Hannover.

== Advantages ==
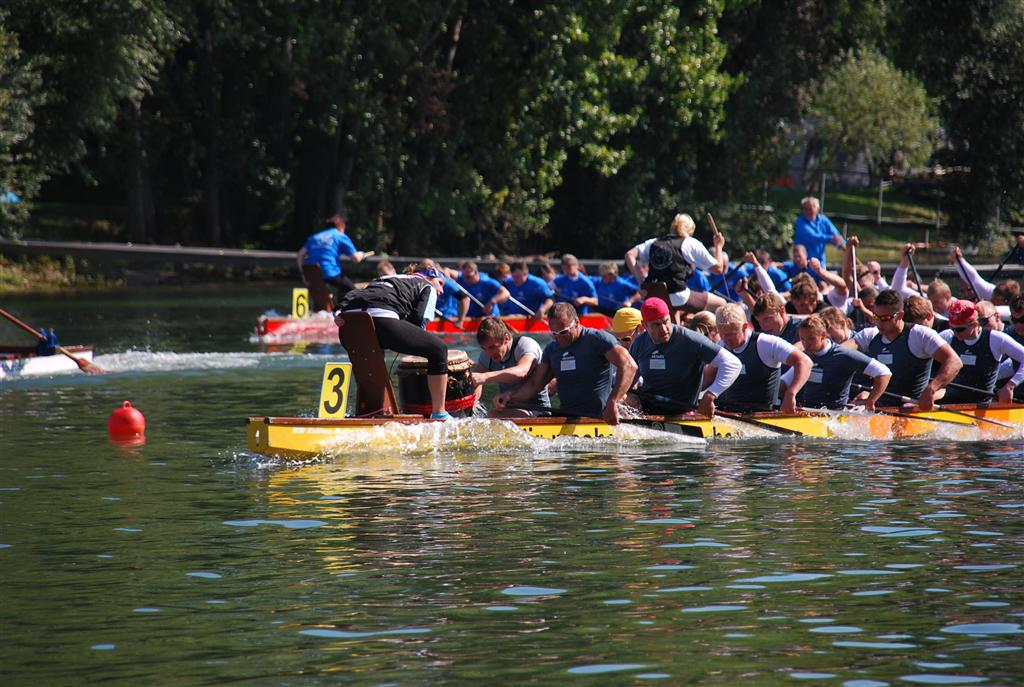
Hybrid Exit

- less wind resistance, because the paddle is moved forward with the edge
- less up and down moving of the upper body
- higher frequencies with longer paddle stroke possible
- smoother boat move, less shaking
- faster forward move with the paddle possible
- boat high speed achieved per single stroke is being kept for a longer time
- longer stroke in general
- less risk to hit waves created by the paddler in front
- less impact of the inner arm shoulder
- less sprinkles
