= Bismarck Tower (Hanover) =

Former monument in Hanover, Germany

Coordinates: 52°21′25″N 9°44′22″E

- Bismarcksäule
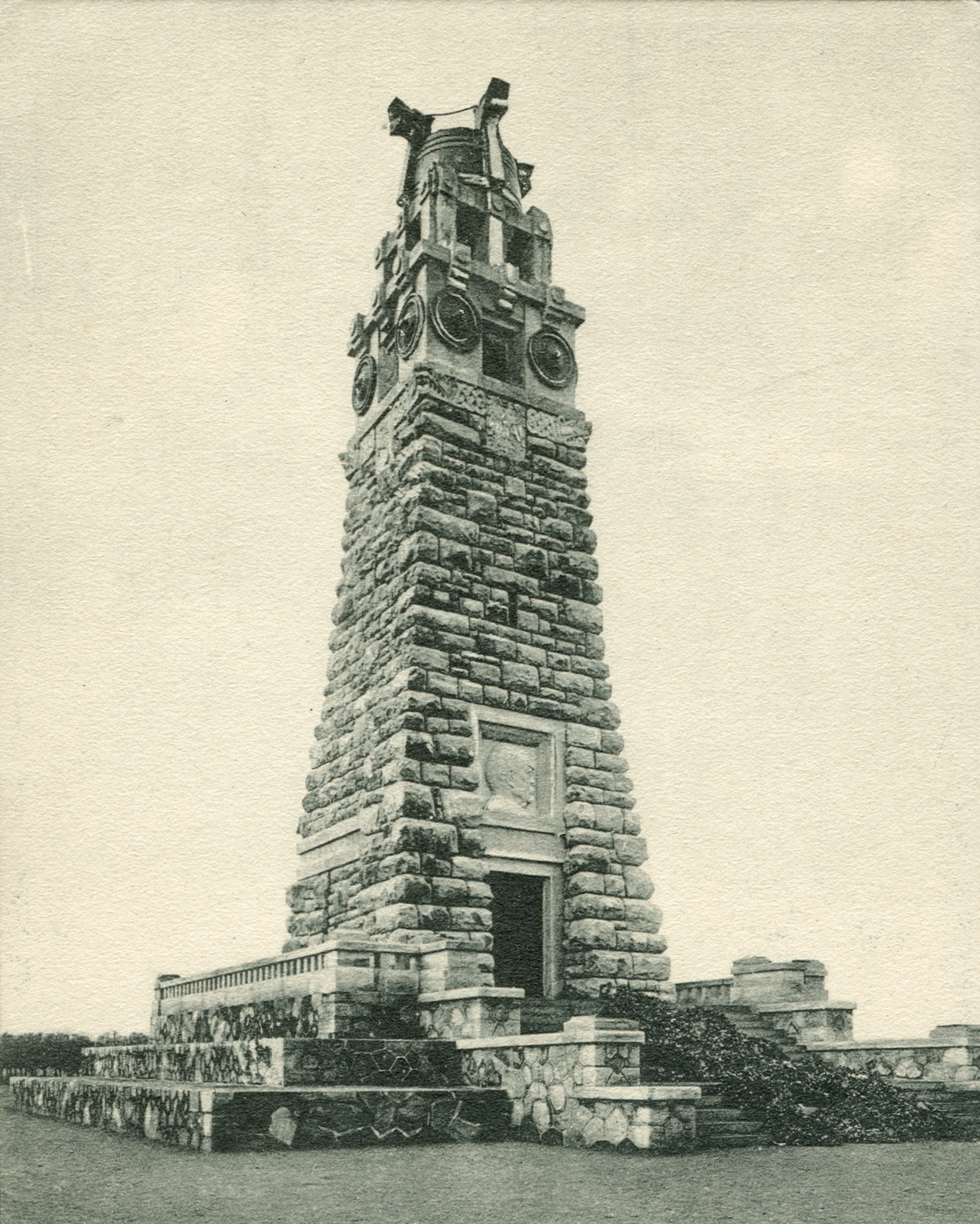
- The Bismarck Tower stood in Hanover from 1904 until 1935.
- Interactive map of Bismarck Tower
- Location: Hanover
- Designer: Wilhelm Kreis
- Type: Tower
- Height: 19.5 m (64 ft)
- Opening date: 18 October 1904
- Dedicated to: Otto von Bismarck
- Dismantled date: Summer 1935

The Bismarck Tower (German: Bismarcksäule) in Hanover, Lower Saxony, was a tower erected as a monument to the first Chancellor of the unified German state Otto von Bismarck for patriotic and nationalistic purposes. It became a hub for national socialist events in the city until its dismantling in 1935 as part of the building of the Maschsee.

== History ==
=== Construction and purposes ===
As part of the growing "Bismarck Cult" in Germany that saw his popularity after his removal from office soar, the national student union had first launched a competition to design a Bismarck Tower in March 1898 to honour him. Their chosen design of the 'Twilight of the Gods' (Götterdämmerung) created by Wilhelm Kreis was selected in 1899 and became the standard model for all such monuments.

Following this trend, the student body of the Hanover Technical College (the present-day Leibniz University Hannover) demanded in early 1899 that such a monument be erected in the city, which could also serve as a meeting place for large nationalist events.

On 25 July 1899, an assembly of city magistrates and the civic council outvoted the Social Democrats and German-Hanoverian Party to commit to creating a memorial. It was decided in March 1901 that it would be built in the centre of the Aegidien-Masch, a wild meadow land area used for various leisure activities at the time, instead of the alternative site of the Eilenriede forest.

The winner of the advertised architect competition launched in March 1901 was the Hanoverian architect Alfred Sasse. His design of a 19.5-metre-high (64 ft) tower featuring a fire bowl surrounded by four dragons’ heads at its peak was selected from a shortlist of five entries in March 1902.

The accessible tower could be climbed to reach a viewing platform at a height of 16 metres (52 ft). Its construction was funded by the Hanoverian Student Union and featured the inscription "Bismarck column of the student union Hanover 1903" (Bismarck-Säule der Studentenschaft Hannover 1903). It was built at a cost of 43,000 Marks, using rough-stone blocks quarried from the nearby Deister hills.

After several postponements due to funding issues and strike action, the laying of the foundation stone eventually took place on 18 October 1903, the 90th anniversary of the victory over the Napoleon at the Battle of Leipzig. The event was accompanied by speeches from numerous leading political, military, student and religious figures from the city.

The Bismarck Tower was officially opened exactly one year later on 18 October 1904. Each year (up to 1916) large nationalist events and rallies would be staged on this date beside the tower to commemorate the Battle of Leipzig's anniversary.

Shortly after the Nazi seizure of power in January 1933, the tower was the scene of a book burning on 10 May, primarily carried out by student groups. The final large event took place on 24 September 1933 when Der Stahlhelm paraded beside it to "celebrate" their integration into the SA, an event that featured around 30,000 participants and drew some 150,000 spectators.

=== Dismantlement ===
Following more than a quarter of a century of discussion over the building of an artificial lake to prevent flooding in the area and the decision in October 1932 to bring this project to fruition under a national job creation programme, the construction of the Maschsee lake on the site of the Aegidien-Masch was begun in March 1934.

Due to its height it was an impractical safety risk to leave the column below the surface of the new lake, which was to become a home for watersport activities. It was therefore carefully dismantled during the summer 1935 with tentative plans to relocate it elsewhere, but the city decided in 1938 not to go ahead with these plans.

== See also ==
- Bismarck tower
