= Süllberg (Calenberg Land) =

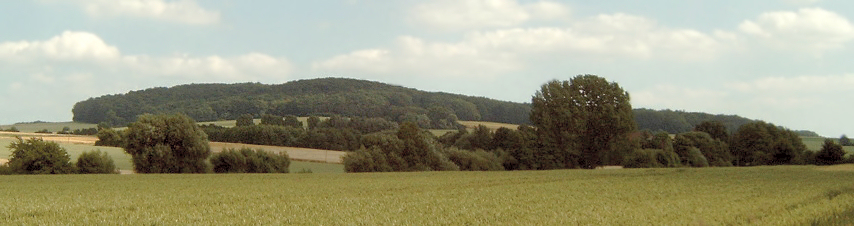

Highest point
- Elevation: 199 m above sea level (NN) (653 ft)
- Prominence: 75 m → Kalenberg
- Isolation: 3.2 km → Kalenberg (Deister)
- Coordinates: 52°15′10″N 9°39′12″E

Geography
- Location within Lower Saxony
- Location: Hanover Region, Lower Saxony, Germany
- Parent range: Calenberg Land

The Süllberg is a ridge, up to 198.2 m above sea level (NN), in the Calenberg Land near Springe in Hanover Region in the German state of Lower Saxony.

== Location ==
The Süllberg and its foothills, the Vörier Berg in the north, and the Wolfsberg in the northeast, lies a few kilometres east of the Deister in Germany's Central Uplands. It rises around 14 kilometres south-southwest of the city of Hanover on the territory of Springe and the municipality of Wennigsen, whose boundary runs over the triple-summit hill. A number of villages lie on the slopes of the ridge or at it feet. These are the Springe villages of Bennigsen to the south-southeast and Lüdersen to the east as well as the villages of Holtensen to the north-northwest and Bredenbeck to the west where the hills transition to the Deister. The Bundesstraße 217 federal road runs about one kilometre west of the Süllberg from north to south.

== Geology ==
The hill was formed during the Jurassic period.

== Walking ==
There are various hiking trails on the wooded Süllberg. One fork in the tracks between two of its peaks lies at an elevation of 182.3 m above NN. Its actual summit is, however, not accessible on a footpath. There are good views from the edge of the woods and, on clear days, the highest hill in the Harz, the Brocken, can be made out to the southeast.

== Utilization by man ==
In the 19th century sandstone was quarried in the Süllberg. Even today, numerous sandstone quarries bear witness to the former industry, especially on the western side. In the Second World War there was an anti-aircrate site on the top of the ridge; today a large number of bomb craters and the concrete foundations remain as evidence. In the north, towards Lüdersen, there is a Cold War bunker. This has now been given by the Federal Property Management Agency to a private investor who specialises in the area of archiving and document storage as a backup.
