= Adolph Freiherr Knigge =

German writer and leading Illuminati member (1752–1796)

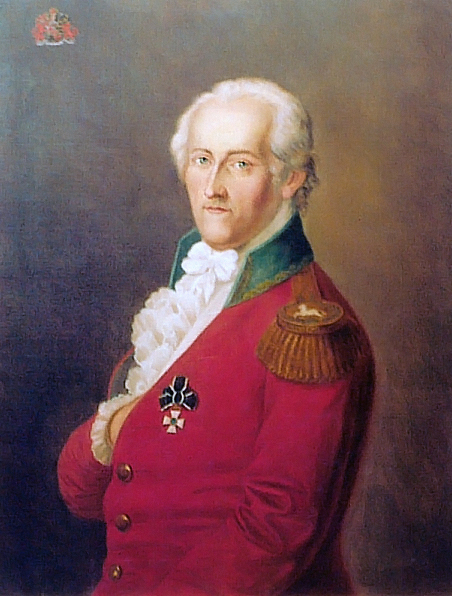
- Freiherr Adolph Knigge
- Born: Adolph Franz Friedrich Ludwig Knigge; 16 October 1752; Wennigsen, Electorate of Hanover, Holy Roman Empire of the German Nation
- Died: 6 May 1796 (aged 43); Free imperial city of Bremen, Holy Roman Empire of the German Nation
- Education: University of Göttingen
- Occupation: Writer/Speaker
- Children: Franz Ludwig Knigge, Philippine Auguste Amalie von Reben, Wilhelm Baron von Knigge
- Parent(s): Carl Philipp Freiherr Knigge (father); Louise Wilhelmine Knigge (mother)

Signature
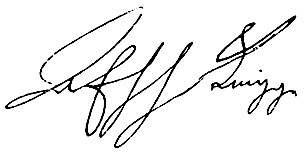

Adolph Franz Friedrich Ludwig Freiherr Knigge (16 October 1752 – 6 May 1796) was a German writer, Freemason, and a leading member of the Order of the Illuminati.

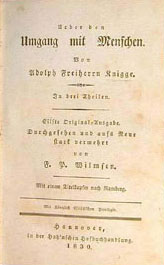
Über den Umgang mit Menschen (On Human Relations)

== Biography ==
Adolph Freiherr von Knigge was born in Bredenbeck (now a part of Wennigsen, Lower Saxony) in the Electorate of Hanover as a member of the Knigge family, an old German nobility dating back to 13th century. He was the only son of Carl Philipp Freiherr Knigge (1723–1766) and his wife, Louise Wilhelmine Baroness Knigge (1730–1763), member of the same family from Weimar. When he was barely eleven, his mother died, and when his father died three years later the teenager inherited a large debt. His creditors took possession of the family property and assigned the boy a meagre pension of 500 thalers.

He studied law from 1769 to 1772 in Göttingen where he became a member of Corps Hannovera. He was allegedly initiated into Freemasonry in 1772 in Kassel, where he held a position as Court Squire (hofjunker) and Assessor of the War and Domains Exchequer. In 1777 he became Chamberlain at the Weimar court.

In 1780 Knigge joined Adam Weishaupt's Bavarian Illuminati and his work with the Illuminati gave the group a great deal of publicity and influence of Masonic chapters. But in 1783 dissensions arose between Knigge and Weishaupt, which resulted in Knigge's final withdrawal from the group on 1 July 1784. Knigge stated that he could no longer endure Weishaupt's pedantic domineering, which frequently assumed offensive forms. He accused Weishaupt of "Jesuitism", and suspected him of being "a Jesuit in disguise" (Nachtr., I, 129). "And was I", he adds, "to labour under his banner for mankind, to lead men under the yoke of so stiff-necked a fellow?—Never!"

Knigge's involvement with the Illuminati, support of the advancement of human rights, and a period of serious illness led to the loss of support of his aristocratic sponsors and finally his fortune. Knigge found a measure of financial stability again with a position in Bremen in 1790. He died in Bremen in 1796.

In Germany, Knigge is best remembered for his book Über den Umgang mit Menschen (On Human Relations), a treatise on the fundamental principles of human relations that has the reputation of being the authoritative guide to behaviour, politeness, and etiquette. The work is more of a sociological and philosophical treatise on the basis of human relations than a how-to guide on etiquette, but the German word “Knigge” has come to mean “good manners” or books on etiquette.

== Works ==
- Allgemeines System für das Volk zur Grundlage aller Erkenntnisse für Menschen aus allen Nationen, Ständen und Religionen (General System for the Public, Towards a Foundation of all Knowledge of People of all Nations, Conditions, and Religions), 1778
- Der Roman meines Lebens (The Story of my Life), 1781
- On the Jesuits, Freemasons, and Rosicrucians, 1781
- Sechs Predigten gegen Despotismus, Dummheit, Aberglauben, Ungerechtigkeit, Untreue und Müßiggang (Six Sermons against Despotism, Stupidity, Superstition, Injustice, Mistruth, and Idleness), 1783
- Geschichte Peter Clausens (The History of Peter Clausen), 1783–85
- Gesammelte politische und prosaische kleinere Schriften (Collected Political and Prosaic Lesser Writings), 1784
- Essay on Freemasonry, 1784
- Contribution towards the latest history of the Order of Freemasons, 1786
- Bekenntnisse (Übersetzung des Rousseauschen Werks aus dem Französischen) (Confessions–Translation of the Works of Rousseau from the French), 1786–90
- Die Verirrungen des Philosophen oder Geschichte Ludwigs von Seelbergs (The Errors of the Philosopher, or Story of Ludwig von Seelberg), 1787
- Philo's endliche Antwort auf verschiedene Anforderungen und Fragen, meine Verbindung mit dem Orden der Illuminaten betreffend (Philo’s Reply To Questions Concerning His Association With the Illuminati), 1788, 2012 ISBN 978-1-105-60407-2
- Über den Umgang mit Menschen (On Human Relations), 1788
- Geschichte des armen Herrn von Mildenberg (The Story of the Poor Herr von Mildenberg), 1789
- Benjamin Noldmanns Geschichte der Aufklärung in Abyssinien (Benjamin Noldmann's History of the Enlightenment in Abyssinia), novel, 1790
- Über den Zustand des geselligen Lebens in den vereinigten Niederlanden (On the Conditions of Social Life in the United Netherlands), 1790
- Das Zauberschloß oder Geschichte des Grafen Tunger (The Enchanted Castle, or the History of Count Tunger), novel, 1791
- Politisches Glaubensbekenntnis von Joseph Wurmbrand (The Political Credo of Joseph Wurmbrand), Essay, 1792
- Die Reise nach Braunschweig (The Journey to Brunswick), novel, 1792
- Erläuterungen über die Rechte des Menschen. Für die Deutschen (Elucidations on the Rights of Men. For the Germans), 1792
- Über Schriftsteller und Schriftstellerey (Of Writers and Writing), essay, 1793
- Geschichte des Amtsraths Guthmann (The Story of Amtsrath Guthmann), 1794
- Reise nach Fritzlar im Sommer 1794 (Journey to Fritzlar in Summer 1794), satire, 1795
- The Secret School of Wisdom: The Authentic Rituals and Doctrines of the Illuminati, edited by Josef Wäges and Reinhard Markner, London: Lewis Masonic, 2015 (contains contributions by Knigge)
