= Ihme =

River in Lower Saxony, Germany

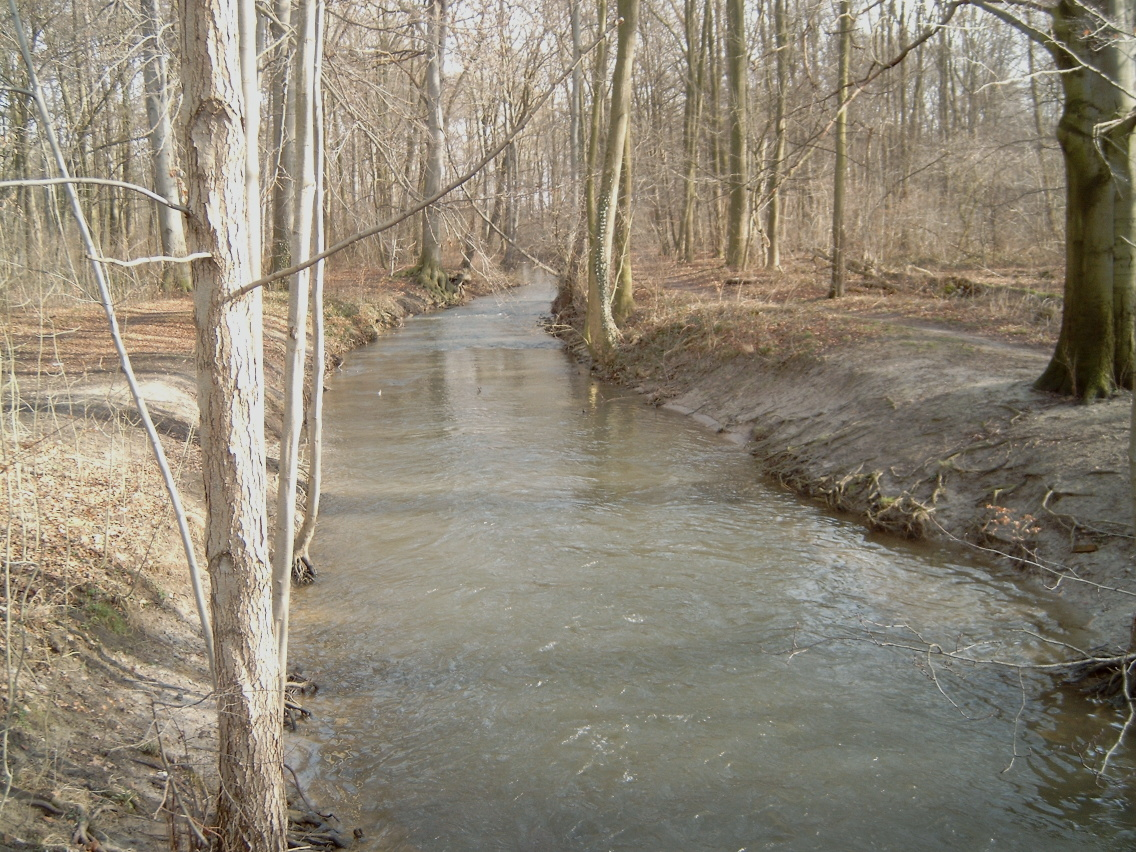
- The Ihme near the southern city boundary of Hanover

Location
- Country: Germany
- State: Lower Saxony
- Location: Hanover Region

Physical characteristics
- Source
  - location: Near Wennigsen
  - elevation: 70 m above sea level (NN)
- Mouth
  - location: In Hanover into the Leine
  - coordinates: 52°22′38″N 9°42′45″E
  - elevation: 50 m above sea level (NN)
- Length: 26.2 km (16.3 mi)
- Basin size: 111 km^{2} (43 sq mi)

Basin features
- Progression: Leine→ Aller→ Weser→ North Sea
- Landmarks: Cities: Hanover; Small towns: Ronnenberg, Wennigsen (Deister)
- Population: 500,000
- Tributaries
  - left: Hirtenbach, Schneller Graben
  - right: Seniebach
- Navigable: Schneller Graben to Leine

The Ihme (Wennigser Mühlbach in its upper course) is a river of Lower Saxony, Germany. It is a left tributary of the Leine.

The Ihme is 26 kilometres (16 mi) long. Its source is in the village Evestorf, a district of Wennigsen. After about 6 kilometres (4 mi), the Ihme reaches the city of Hanover, where it flows into the Leine. In order to protect the city centre of Hanover from flooding, much of the water of the Leine is rerouted by a ditch into the Ihme. A bridge over the Ihme is named in memory of Benno Ohnesorg.

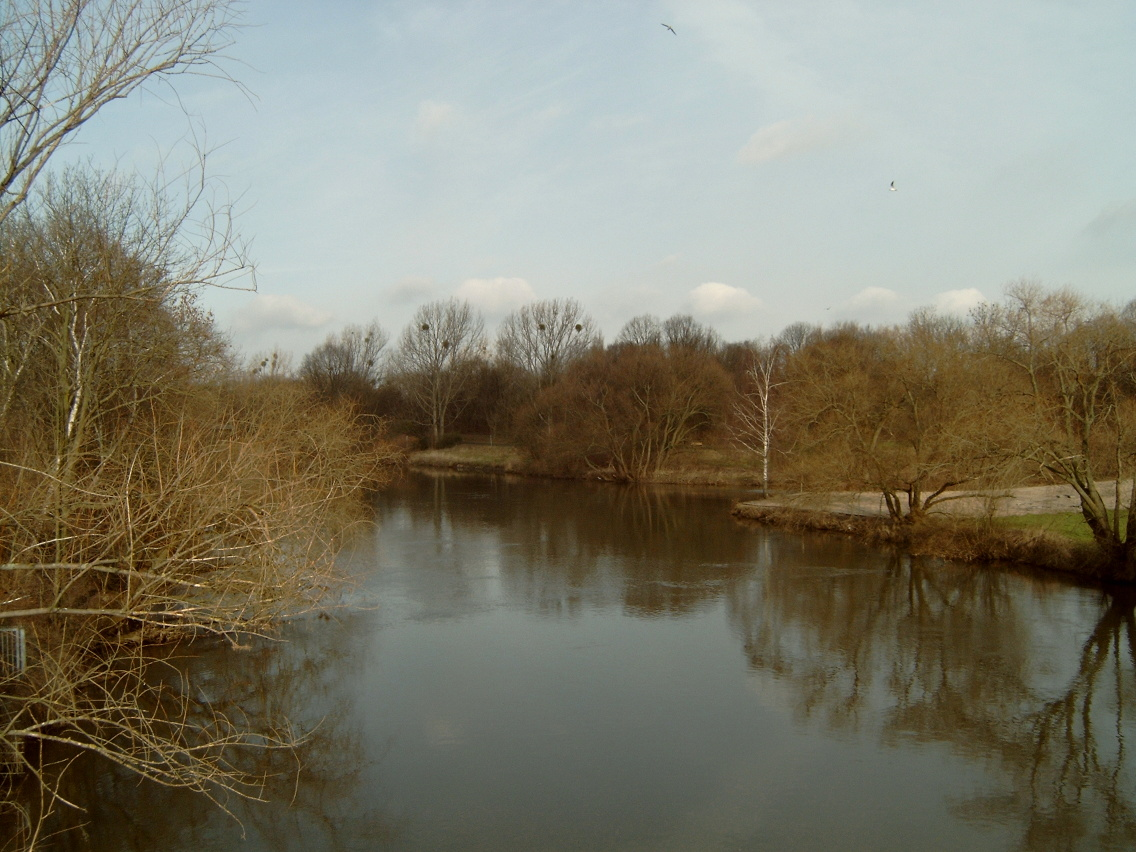
The confluence of the Ihme with the Leine, with the Leine shown on the right

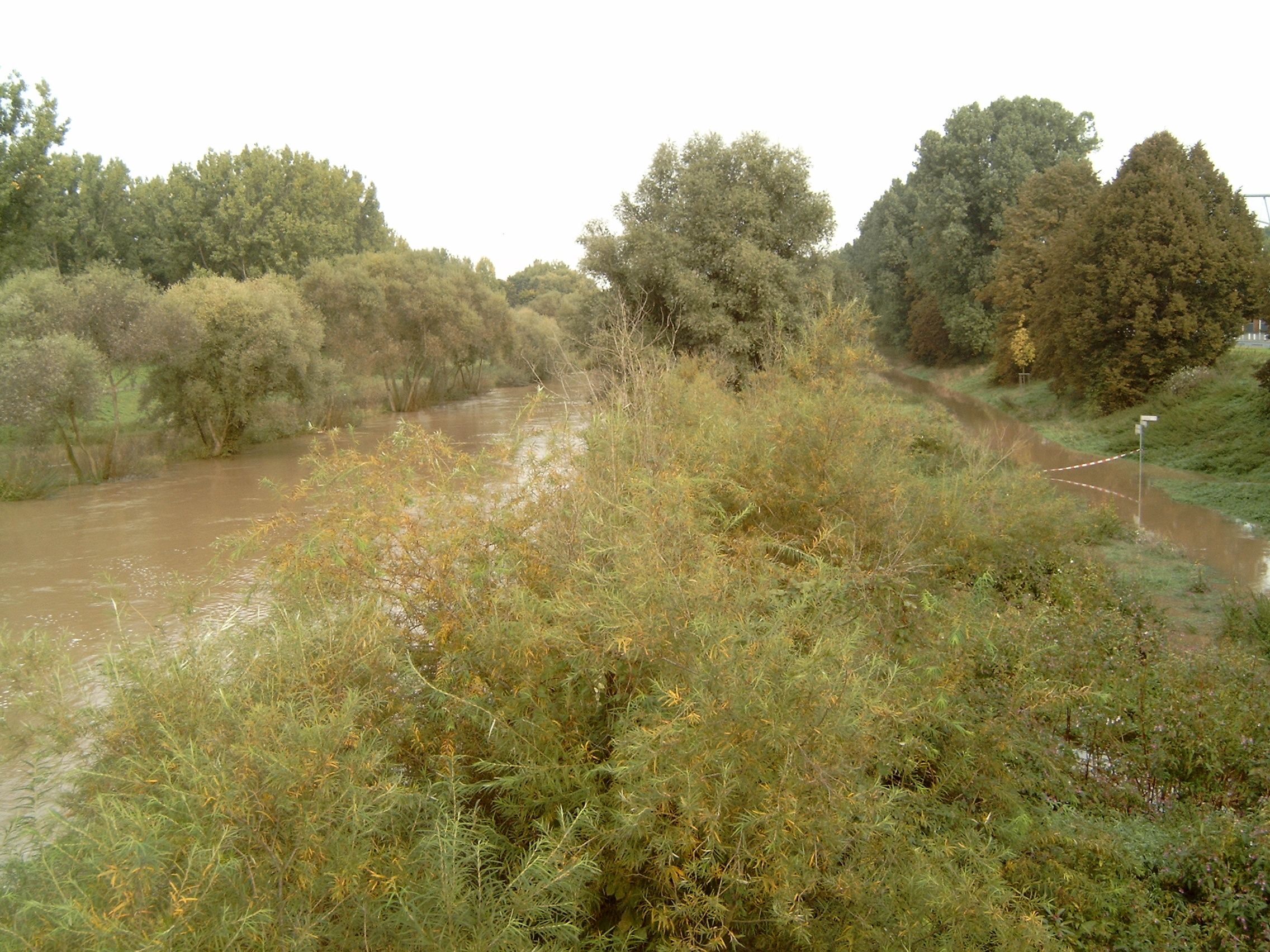
Ihme in a flood ditch to the left of a flooded bicycle path in Hanover, taking floodwater to the Leine.

The Ihme gives its name to the village Ihme that, together with the village Roloven, forms the Ronnenberg district of Ihme-Roloven.

== See also ==
- List of rivers of Lower Saxony
