= Wennigsen =

- Municipality
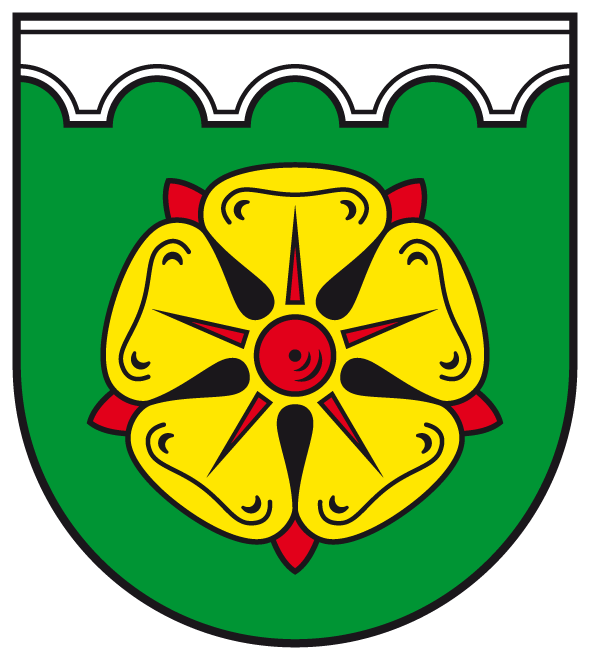
- Coat of arms

- Location of Wennigsen within Hanover district
- Interactive map of Wennigsen
- Location within Germany Location within Lower Saxony
- Coordinates: 52°16′27″N 9°34′15″E
- Country: Germany
- State: Lower Saxony
- District: Hanover
- Subdivisions: 8 districts

Government
  - Mayor (2021–26): Ingo Klokemann (SPD)

Area
  - Total: 53.88 km^{2} (20.80 sq mi)
- Elevation: 99 m (325 ft)

Population (2025-12-31)
  - Total: 14,216
  - Density: 263.8/km^{2} (683.4/sq mi)
- Time zone: UTC+01:00 (CET)
  - Summer (DST): UTC+02:00 (CEST)
- Postal codes: 30974
- Dialling codes: 05103, 05109, 05105, 05045
- Vehicle registration: H
- Website: www.wennigsen.de

Wennigsen (German pronunciation: [ˈvɛnɪçsn̩] or [ˈvɛnɪksn̩]) is a municipality in the district of Hanover, in Lower Saxony, Germany. It is situated near the Deister hills, approx. 15 km southwest of Hanover.

== Geography ==
Wennigsen borders on (from north and clockwise) Gehrden, Ronnenberg, Springe and Barsinghausen. The highest elevation is the Bröhn, the highest hill of the Deister with 405 meters.

== History ==
The founding date of Wennigsen is unknown. It possibly dates back to 5th to 8th century. The first dated occurrence (1199 to 1206) is a copy of a certificate from bishop Hartbert of Hildesheim. At this time there was a settlement of Bernhard, earl of Poppenburg, in Wennigsen. He had three roses each with five leaves in his coat of arms. Today Wennigsen bears one of them in its coat of arms.

During the Thirty Years' War Wennigsen was near to be completely destroyed.

Duke George William of Hanover (later of Brunswick-Lüneburg) split the Großvogtei Calenberg and founded a new Amt Calenberg in which Wennigsen became court place. The Magistrates' Court of Wennigsen still exists.

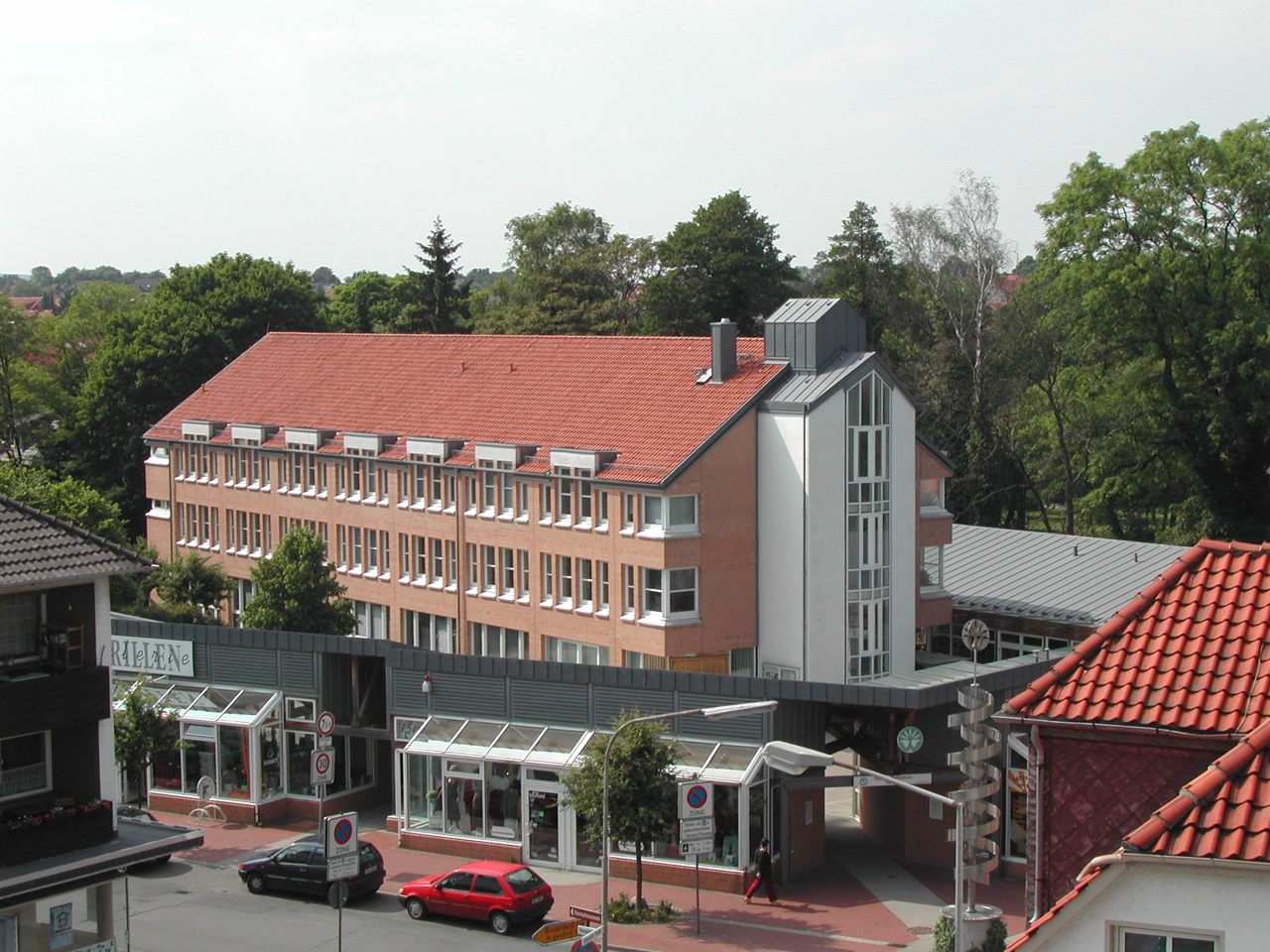
Town hall Wennigsen (Deister)

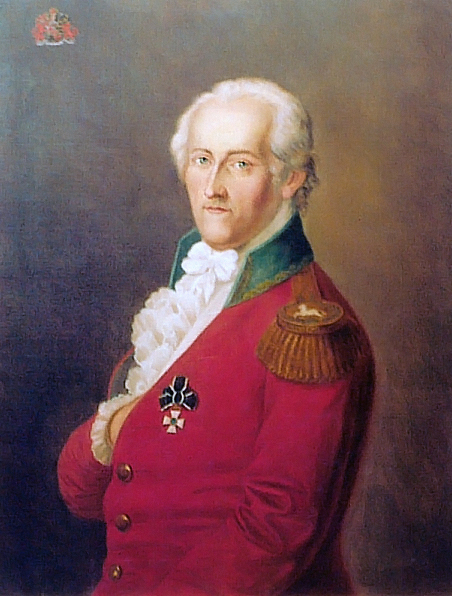
Adolph Freiherr Knigge

== Notable people ==
- Adolph Freiherr Knigge (1752-1796), born in Bredenbeck, writer of the Enlightenment.
- Heinz Erhardt (1909-1979), comedian, musician and actor, lived at the Wennigser Mark
- Gesine Meissner (born 1952), politician (FDP), a member of the European Parliament
- Hans-Georg Wenzel (1949-1999), geodesist, geophysicist and university lecturer
- Christoph Meineke (born 1979), former mayor of Wennigsen (Deister)
