= Behre =

Behre is a surname. Notable people with the surname include:

- David Behre (born 1986), German Paralympic sprint runner
- Frederick Behre (1863–1942), American artist
- Wilfried Behre (born 1956), German artist and sculptor

== See also ==
- Behr
- Bere (surname)
