= Bere (surname) =

Bere is a surname. Notable people with the surname include:

- Charles Bere (1829–1889), English cricketer and clergyman
- Jason Bere (born 1971), American baseball player
- John Bere (died 1617), Irish politician
- John Bere (academic), English academic
- Justin Bere, British architect
- Minnie Bere (1875–1910), Scottish medical missionary
- Rennie Montague Bere (1907–1991), British mountaineer and naturalist
- Thomas Bere, multiple people
