= Hans Joachim Schliep =

German Lutheran official

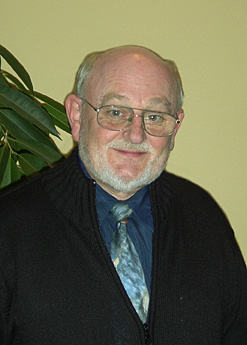
Pastor Hans Joachim Schliep

Hans Joachim Schliep (22 March 1945 – 29 January 2025) was a German Lutheran theologian, pastor and author. From 1990 to 1999 he was director of the Amt für Gemeindedienst (English: Office for Community Service, since 2002 Haus kirchlicher Dienste of the Evangelical-Lutheran Church of Hanover), and by May 2000 the commissioner for the environment (German: Umweltbeauftragter) of the Church of Hanover and the Confederation of Protestant Churches in Lower Saxony. From 1999 to 2008 Schliep was the first pastor at the Kronsberg Church Centre and founder of the congregation at the Expo-neighbourhood in Kronsberg, Hanover, Lower Saxony, Germany.

== Biography ==
=== Study ===
Schliep finished junior high school in 1961 and started an apprenticeship at the Seebeck Shipyard in Bremerhaven as an industrial clerk and worked there until 1965. In 1969 he attended the Jung-Stilling-College in Espelkamp (Ecclesiastical Institute for the attainment of higher education) for his high school diploma and finished a study of Protestant theology, philosophy and in social sciences. In 1974 Schliep gained a first theology degree at the Ruhr University Bochum and served subsequently as vicar for the Evangelical Church of Westphalia at the Stiepel Village Church in Stiepel, Bochum, Westphalia.

=== Career ===
Schliep was ordained in October 1976 and was pastor at the Evangelical Lutheran Church of the Cross in Bremerhaven.

In 1983 Schliep was appointed department head (Dezernent), titled Oberkirchenrat (superior ecclesiastical councillor) to the Hanover Regional Church Office (German: Landeskirchenamt Hannover) of the Church of Hanover responsible for the training of pastors, adult education, folk high schools ("Heimvolkshochschulen") and other things.

On 1 March 1990 Schliep was appointed director of the Amt für Gemeindedienst (Office of Community Service) and commissioner for the environment (until 31 May 2000) of the Church of Hanover and the Confederation of Protestant Churches in Lower Saxony. From 1991 he was the coordinator and manager of the Church of Hanover Help for Chernobyl Children (since 1994: AG Hilfe für Tschernobylkinder). During this time he was the first and only Commissioner for Aviation for the Church of hannover. From 1994 to 1999 Schliep was in personal union director of the Amt für Gemeindedienst, department head at the Hanover Regional Church Office and an extraordinary member in the college of the Regional Church Office (German: Ausserordentliches Mitglied im -Kollegium- des Landeskirchenamtes Hannover).

Schliep left his leadership offices at his own request in April 1999 and became pastor at the Kronsberg Church Centre (official Exhibit (ExpoNAT) of the Expo 2000) in Kronsberg (Hanover), which was established in 2000 in connection with the EXPO 2000 in Hanover (motto "Humankind-Nature-Technology"). As Kronsberg Pastor he was founder and responsible for building up the congregation at the development area (Expo-settlement), created for Expo 2000 at Kronsberg, Hanover. The Christ Pavilion on the Expo terrain belonged to the congregation of Pastor Schliep. From 2002 to 2008 he was moreover pastor for the congregation of Wülferode Chapel. In 2011 he was awarded the plaque of honour of the City District Council Kirchrode-Bemerode-Wülferode (German: Ehrenplakette des Stadtbezirkrates Kirchrode-Bemerode-Wülferode).

From September 2008 to March 2010 Schliep was theological advisor at the Center for Health Ethics (German: Zentrum für Gesundheitsethik) with the Loccum Academy (German: Evangelische Akademie Loccum) and again the Commissioner for the environment of the Church of Hanover. On 1 April 2010, Pastor Schliep went into retirement, but still retained his office as commissioner for the environment of the Church of Hanover to March 2012. Until 2016 he worked as pastor, substitute at the Marktkirche und Neustädter Kirche in Hanover for example and as a Speaker and consultant. He wrote and kept several radio devotions (NDR and others). The funeral service took place on 13 February 2025 in the Neustädter Hof-und Stadtkirche in Hanover.

== Other functions and memberships (selection) ==
- 1983-1989:Chairman of the Lutherstift Falkenburg charity
- 1983-1989: School board of the Lower Saxon Hermannsburg Lutheran adult education centre (German: de:Niedersächsische Lutherische Heimvolkshochschule Hermannsburg)
- 1983-02/1990: Chairman of the working group pastoral care (German: AG Seelsorge) of the Church of Hanover (Member until 1999)
- 1990- 1999: Member of the Board of the Lutheran publican House (lutherisches Verlagshaus) and co-publisher of the "Vorlagen" Magazine of the Lutheran publican House
- 1983-2000: the Church of Hanover responsible manager for talks with business and unions
- 1984-2001: Chairman of the Examining Commission of the second theological examination (per ministerio) of the Church of Hanover (Member until 2004)
- 1985-1994: Member of the EKD-chamber of Education
- 1985/86: Guest lecturer at the Protestant University of Applied Sciences and Arts (Evangelische Fachhochschule Hannover)
- 1992-1998: Chairman of the Ev. Village assistants work Lower Saxony (German: Evangelisches Dorfhelferinnenwerk Niedersachsen )
- 1992-1998: Schliep represented the Church of Hanover in the Board of Trustees of the Lower Saxon State Foundation for Children of Chernobyl (German: Landesstiftung Kinder von Tschernobyl).
- 10/2015-2018: Member of the board of the association Encounter - Christians and Jews in Lower Saxony (German: Begegnung - Christen und Juden in Niedersachsen e.V.)

== Published (selection) ==
=== Books and writings ===
- Werkzeug und Denkzeug - Zur Ethik der Technik, 1986, ISBN 3-87502-262-9
- Der Evangelisch Soziale Kongreß 1905 in Hannover, Hanover: Evang.-Luth. Landeskirche Hannover, 1996
- 10 Jahre Evangelisches Kirchenzentrum Hannover-Kronsberg - Schrift zum 10-jährigen Jubiläum der Einweihung des Ev. Kirchenzentrums Kronsberg, Hanover: Ev.-Luth. Kirchengemeinde St.Johannis Bemerode, 2010
- Was uns unbedingt angeht... - Kronsberger Predigten, Saarbrücken: Fromm-Verlag, 2012, ISBN 978-3-8416-0369-2
- Gläubiger Realismus - Kronsberger Reden, Saarbrücken: Fromm-Verlag, 2012, ISBN 978-3-8416-0377-7
- Mach es mit meinem Ende gut - für ein Lebensende in Würde, Saarbrücken: Fromm-Verlag, 2012, ISBN 978-3-8416-0179-7
- Mehr als meine Augen sehen - Kronsberger Predigten 2, Saarbrücken: Fromm-Verlag, 2013, ISBN 978-3-8416-0391-3
- Ein unglaublicher Glaube - Kronsberger Predigten 3, Saarbrücken: Fromm-Verlag, 2014, ISBN 978-3-8416-0534-4
- Der Werdendste, der wird - Rilkes religiöse Poesie am Rande des Christentums, Saarbrücken: Fromm-Verlag, 2015, ISBN 978-3-8416-0585-6
- Auf dem Tische Brot und Wein- Poesie und Religion bei Georg Trakl, Fromm Verlag, 2019, ISBN 978-613-8-35764-3 (translated and published in English, Spanish, Portuguese, Italian language)
  - English edition: on the Table Bread and wine- poetry and Religion in the works of Georg Trakl, Lambert Academic Publishing (LAP), 2020, ISBN 978-6200537300
- Christus in der Arbeitswelt- Der Sozial-und Kirchenreformer Wilhelm Fahlbusch (1929 bis 2014), Fromm Verlag, 2020, ISBN 978-613-8-36520-4 Review: Wolfgang Vögele, Arbeitswelt und Sozialethik in Magazin für Theologie und Ästhetik, Heft 129, 2021
- Faithfull realism: Kronsberg Speeches, Lambert Academic Publishing (LAP),2020 ISBN 978-6200570192

=== Articles and others ===
- Hans Joachim Schliep, „Sedierung am Lebensende“, in: Ethik in der Medizin, vol. 12, June 2010, ISSN 0935-7335
- Hans Joachim Schliep, „Anfang und Ende des Lebens“, in: Berliner Theologische Zeitschrift, vol. 12, No. 2 (1995), ISSN 0724-6137
- Erarbeitung der EKD-Stellungnahme „Zur Achtung vor dem Leben“ (1987)
- EKD-Text 37 „Ev. Bildungsverständnis in einer sich wandelnden Arbeitsgesellschaft“ (1991) (federführend)
- Hans Joachim Schliep, „Politik, Umwelt, Staat“, in: Evangelische Glaubensfibel, Gütersloh: CMZ:Verlag Gütersloher Verlagshaus, pp. 188seqq. ISBN 978-3-579-06428-4
- Evangelischer Taschenkatechismus, CMZ-Verlag am Birnbach. Hans Joachim Schliep: Politik S. 351ff
- Hans Joachim Schliep, „Seelsorgebewegung und Kirchenleitung. Zwischen Initiative und Institution“, in: Wege zum Menschen, vol. 45. (1993), pp. 443seqq.
- Hans Joachim Schliep, „Kirche in der Erlebnisgesellschaft“, in: Pastoralthologie - Monatsschrift für Wissenschaft und Praxis in Kirche und Gesellschaft, vol. 85. (No. June/1996), pp. 211seqq.
- Hans Joachim Schliep, „Ich suche allerlanden eine neue Stadt Offenbarung 21 und 22“, in: Und Sie sahen eine Neue Erde - 20 Jahre Arbeitsgemeinschaft der Umweltbeauftragten in der Evangelischen Kirche in Deutschland, ISBN 3-931845-66-4
- Jacques Gassmann, Apokalypse, mit Hans Joachim Schliep: (K)ein Buch mit sieben Siegeln- Eine Kleine Lesehilfe Verlag: Edition Braus (1992),ISBN 978-3-89466-025-3
- Schliep, Hans Joachim: Gott und die Alten -Theologische Überlegungen in kirchenpraktischer Absicht zum dritten und vierten Alter in: Burbach, Christiane; Merkel, Erst Christoph (Hg): Aufbruch zum Diesseits,. Festschrift für Wilhelm Fahlbusch . Ev. Fachhochschule Hannover. Hannover 1995
- Hans Joachim Schliep: Jenseits der Spezialisierung. Versuch, ein gemeinsames Selbstverständnis kirchlicher Dienste, Werke und Verbände wiederzuentdecken In: Anhelm, Fritz Erich (Hg): Loccumer Protokolle, Loccum 1995
- Hans Joachim Schliep: Gerhard Uhlhorn und die Sonntagsfrage in: Lutherische Monatshefte, 27. Jahrgang, 1988, S: 510-515, ISSN 0024-7618
- Hans Joachim Schliep: Die Soziale Verantwortung der Kirche: Eine Erinnerung an Abt Gerhard Uhlhorn in: Jahrbuch der Gesellschaft für Niedersachsen, 1992, S. 185–200
- Hans Joachim Schliep: Gläubiger Realismus, Das Ethische bei Paul Tillich, in: Luth. Monatshefte, 25.Jahrgang, 1986, S. 414–418, ISSN 0024-7618
- Hans Joachim Schliep: Evangelisch aus gutem Grund. Gedanken zum Evangelisch sein, in: Arbeitshilfe zur Kirchenvorstands- und Gemeindekirchenratswahl 2000, hg. von den Informations- und Pressestellen der Ev.-luth. Landeskirchen Hannovers, Braunschweig, Oldenburg und Schaumburg-Lippe, S. 7–13
- Hans Joachim Schliep: Kirche und Markt - Kirche muss sich den Konkurrenten stellen, in: Armin Pollehn u. a.: Combook. Kommunikationshandbuch für kirchliche Öffentlichkeitsarbeit, Luth. Verlagshaus, Hannover 2001, S. 153–158, ISBN 3-7859-0820-2 (zuerst veröffentlicht unter dem Titel "Kirche auf dem Markt" in: Dialog, Hannover 1 / 1997, S. 6–9
- * „Dialog und Solidarität. Christen in der pluralistischen Gesellschaft“ (1999, hg. Hans Joachim Meyer): Hans Joachim Schliep: Ökologischer Strukturwandel“, S. 181–190
- Christentum und Kultur – ein gestörtes Verhältnis?“ (1998, hg. Gerhard Feige)

Beinhaltet seinen Aufsatz „Wettbewerb als Kultur. Kirche und Konkurrenz in der modernen Gesellschaft“, S. 27–43.

- in Im Namen Gottes 1 Kanzelreden zur 1. Perikopenreihe von Christoph Dinkel, Radius Verlag, 2008 ISBN 978-3871733314 Predigt zu Johannes 3 1-8 (9-15) S.274 ff
- Hans Joachim Schliep: Ein Stein von Ulrich Rückriem im Ev. Kirchenzentrum Kronsberg in Markus Zinn (Hg.): Siehe! Zeitgenössische Kunst in Evangelischen Kirchen, Frankfurt/M. 2007. S. 139–144
- Hans Joachim Schliep: 4.4: Globale Verantwortung,4.4.1: Die natürlichen Lebensgrundlagen In Evangelischer Erwachsenenkatechismus, VELKD; Gütersloher Verlagshaus, ISBN 978-3-579-05928-0, 8. Auflage 2010
- Hans Joachim Schliep: Zum Verhältnis zwischen Mensch und Tier: Theologisch-Ethische Grundlegung: S. 7–17 in Kirchlicher Dienst auf dem Lande (KDL) der Ev.-Luth. Landeskirche Hannovers im Haus kirchlicher Dienste, Themenheft Landwirtschaftliche Nutztierhaltung, 2011
- Hans Joachim Schliep: Rez. zu: Kirche in Bewegten Zeiten, Herausgeber: Hans Otte u.a: in Jahrbuch der Gesellschaft für Niedersächsische Kirchengeschichte, 109. Band 2011, V.Ö: 2012
- Hans Joachim Schliep: Senior Bödeker und der Tierschutz in Hannover, in: Jahrb. der Ges. f. nds. Kirchengeschichte 110. Bd. (2012), S. 199–204
- Hans Joachim Schliep: Rez. zu Dirk Riesener: Volksmission zwischen Volkskirche und Republik. 75 Jahre Haus kirchlicher Dienste der Ev.-luth. Landeskirche Hannovers, Hannover 2012, in: Jahrb. der Ges. f. nds. Kirchengeschichte 110. Bd. (2012), S. 231–234
- Hans Joachim Schliep: Der Evangelisch-Soziale Kongress in Hannover 1905 in Jahrbuch der Gesellschaft für Niedersächsische Kirchengeschichte 2013 (JGNKG - 111. Band), S. 191–219.
  - Hans Joachim Schliep: Rez. zu "Zu brüderlichem Gespräch vereinigt". Die Rundschreiben der Bekenntnisgemeinschaft der Ev.-luth. Landeskirche Hannovers 1933-1944, hg. v. Karl-F. Oppermann, 3 Bände, 2004 S., mit Abb., Hannover 2013
  - Hans Joachim Schliep: Rez. zu Kirche im Widerspruch. Texte aus der Bekennenden Kirche Kurhessen-Waldeck, hg. v. Michael Dorhs u. a., Band II, 1.447 S., mit Abb., Darmstadt 2013
- Hans Joachim Schliep: Rez. zu Horst Hirschler / Ludolf Ulrich (Hg.): Kloster Loccum - Geschichten, Hannover 2012, in: Jahrb. der Ges. f. nds. Kirchengeschichte 110. Bd. (2012), S. 254–256
- Hans Joachim Schliep: Rezension zu Hauke Marahrens: Praktizierte Staatskirchenhoheit im Nationalsozialismus. Die Finanzabteilungen in der nationalsozialistischen Kirchenpolitik und ihre Praxis in den Landeskirchen von Hannover, Braunschweig und Baden, Göttingen 2014 [JGNKG 2014, S. 186–190]
- Hans Joachim Schliep: Rezension zu Axel Wunderlich: Re-education durch Rechristianisierung? Die Stellung der hann. Landeskirche zur NS-Herrschaft und Demokratiegründung nach 1945, Frankfurt 2014 [JGNKG 2014, S. 196–199]
- Hans Joachim Schliep: Rezension zu Dieter Bischop u. a. (Hg.): Burg und Kirche in Wulsdorf, Bremerhaven 2014 [JGNKG 2014, S. 210–212]
- Hans Jochim Schliep: Serie: Liebe, Ehe, Familie in Evangelische Zeitung für Niedersachsen, 10 Folgen, erste Folge 18. Mai 2014.
- Hans Joachim Schliep: "Protestantische Ethik und Moderner Sozialstaat - Fernwirkungen der Reformation" (Kongressbericht 4. / 5. April 2014 in Berlin, Franz. Friedrichstadtkirche)
- Hans Joachim Schliep: Balanceakt. Interpretation einer Karikatur von Saul Steinberg, in: Ev. Zeitung Nr. 24 vom 14.06.2015, S. 24.
- Hans Joachim Schliep: Protestant Ethics and the Modern Welfare State, in: G. Wegner (Hg.): The Legitimacy of the Welfare State, Leipzig 2015, S. 278–295 - ISBN 978-3-374-04163-3
- Hans Joachim Schliep: Der antiquierte Mensch - Was aus uns noch werden kann, in: AUFSCHLÜSSE - ZEITSCHRIFT FÜR SPIRITUELLE IMPULSE, hg. v. Gruppe 153, Nr. 58 / September 2015, S. 21–27
- Hans Joachim Schliep: Serie: Reformation und Technik in Evangelische Zeitung für Niedersachsen, 5 Artikel, 2. Oktober 2016 (Erste V.ö)
- Hans Joachim Schliep: Theodor Lohmann - ein lutherischer Sozialreformer, in: Jahrbuch der Gesellschaft für Niedersächsische Kirchengeschichte (JGNKG 114. Bd. 2016 / ISSN 0072-4238), S. 173–226.
- Hans Joachim Schliep: Rez. zu Peter Schyga/Dirk Glufke: Wider die Vergottung des Volkstums und der Rasse. Die öffentlichen Einwürfe des Goslarers Pastors Holtermann gegen das NS-Regime, Wolfenbüttel 2015 (ISBN 978-3-9813453-6-0), in: JGNKG 114. Bd. 2016, S. 292–295.
- Hans Joachim Schliep: Rez. zu Gerd Meyer: Grenzgänger der evangelischen Kirche, Berlin 2014 (ISBN 978-3-86386-715-7), in: JGNKG 114. Bd. 2016, S. 301–303.
- Hans Joachim Schliep: Reformations-Notwendigkeiten, in: Aufschlüsse - Zeitschrift für spirituelle Impulse, Nr. 66 / September 2017 (hg. v. Gruppe 153 - Ev.-luth. Missionsdienst e. V.), S. 28–34
- Hans Joachim Schliep: Reformation - Ressource für morgen?, in: Rundbrief Nr. 76 / August 2017 der EAfA (Ev. Arbeitsgemeinschaft für Altenarbeit in der Ev. Kirche in Deutschland), S. 1–7
- Hans Joachim Schliep: nun springt über die Mauer, geht rein!-Eine Skizze zum Kirchlichen Dienst in der Arbeitswelt in der Ev.-luth. Landeskirche Hannovers in Priorität für die Arbeit-Profile kirchlicher Präsenz in der Arbeitswelt gestern und heute; Festschrift für Günter Brakelmann zum 90. Geburtstag.; Schriften des Netzwerkes zur Erforschung des Sozialen Protestantismus Band 1, Hrsg. Traugott Jähnichen, Roland Pelikan, Sigrid Reihs, Johnanes Rehm, Lit-Verlag ISBN 978-3-643-14941-1, S. 73-86.

=== Editor ===
- "Vorlagen" Aufsatzreihe Hg. von Horst Hirschler in Verbindung mit Gerhard Isermann, Hans May und Hans Joachim Schliep:Viggo Mortensen (Hrsg.): Krieg, Konfession, Konziliaritàt - Was heißt "gerechter Krieg" in CA XVI heute? [War, Confession and Conciliarity - What does "just war" in the Augsburg Confession mean today?] Lutherisches Verlagshaus, Vorlagen Nr. 18, ISBN 3-7859-0659-5, Hannover 1993
- Axel Freiherr von Campenhausen: Staat und Kirche unter dem Grundgesetz, Eine Orientierung »Vorlagen. Neue Folge 22«. Lutherisches Verlagshaus ISBN 3-7859-0685-4
- Jan Olaf Rüttgart: Schweige und höre: Erfahrungen aus Meditation und geistlicher Betrachtung, Vorlagen. Neue Folge Heft 19. Lutherisches Verlagshaus, Hannover ISBN 3-7859-0660-9
- Vorlagen. Neue Folge 21: Fremd sein. Systematisch-theologische Überlegungen. In: J.Ringleben / Kl.Winkler, Umgang mit Fremden, Luther.Verlagshaus Hannover 1994 (Vorlagen.NF 21).
- Vorlagen. Neue Folge 23: Ulrich von der Steinen: Christliche Verantwortung in Friedensgefährdeter Welt-eine konfliktethische Orientierung, Lutherisches Verlagshaus, 1994 ISBN 978-3785906880
- Hans Joachim Schliep (Herausgeber als Direktor des Amtes Für Gemeindedienst): Beate Blatz: Erbstücke aus der Hannoverschen Landeskirche, 50 Jahre Amt für Gemeindedienst, Missionshandlung Hermannsburg, 1991, ISBN 3-87546-069-3, Hans Joachim Schliep: Zur Herausgabe S.9/10, kapitel 6: Auftrag, S 252–266

== About/mentioned Pastor Schliep (selection) ==
- de:Dirk Riesener: Volkmission-75 Jahre Haus kirchlicher Dienste (House of Church Services)-früher Amt für Gemeindedienst- der Evangelisch-lutherischen Landeskirche Hannovers, Lutherisches Verlagshaus, 2012, ISBN 978-3-7859-1080-1, S. 16, 18, 429, 453, 467, 470, 471, 472, 506, 572, 581, 582, 584, 585. 586, 587, 599 und Gemeindeaufbau auf dem Kronsberg; S. 556–559
- Baltruweit: Ich sing für Dich – Über Raben- und Lebenszeiten; Lied " Ich möchte Rabe sein" (Text inspiriert von Hans Joachim Schliep) ISBN 978-3-926512-89-5, CD, 2011
