= Stooke =

Stooke is a surname. Notable people with the surname include:

- Elliott Stooke (born 1993), English rugby union player
- George F. Stooke (1867–1907), English physician and medical missionary
- Nathan Stooke (born 1976), American swimmer
- Wally Stooke (1895–1962), Australian rules football player, coach, and administrator
