= Evangelical Church Centre Kronsberg =

Church building in Hanover, Germany

Coordinates: 52°20′20″N 9°50′09″E

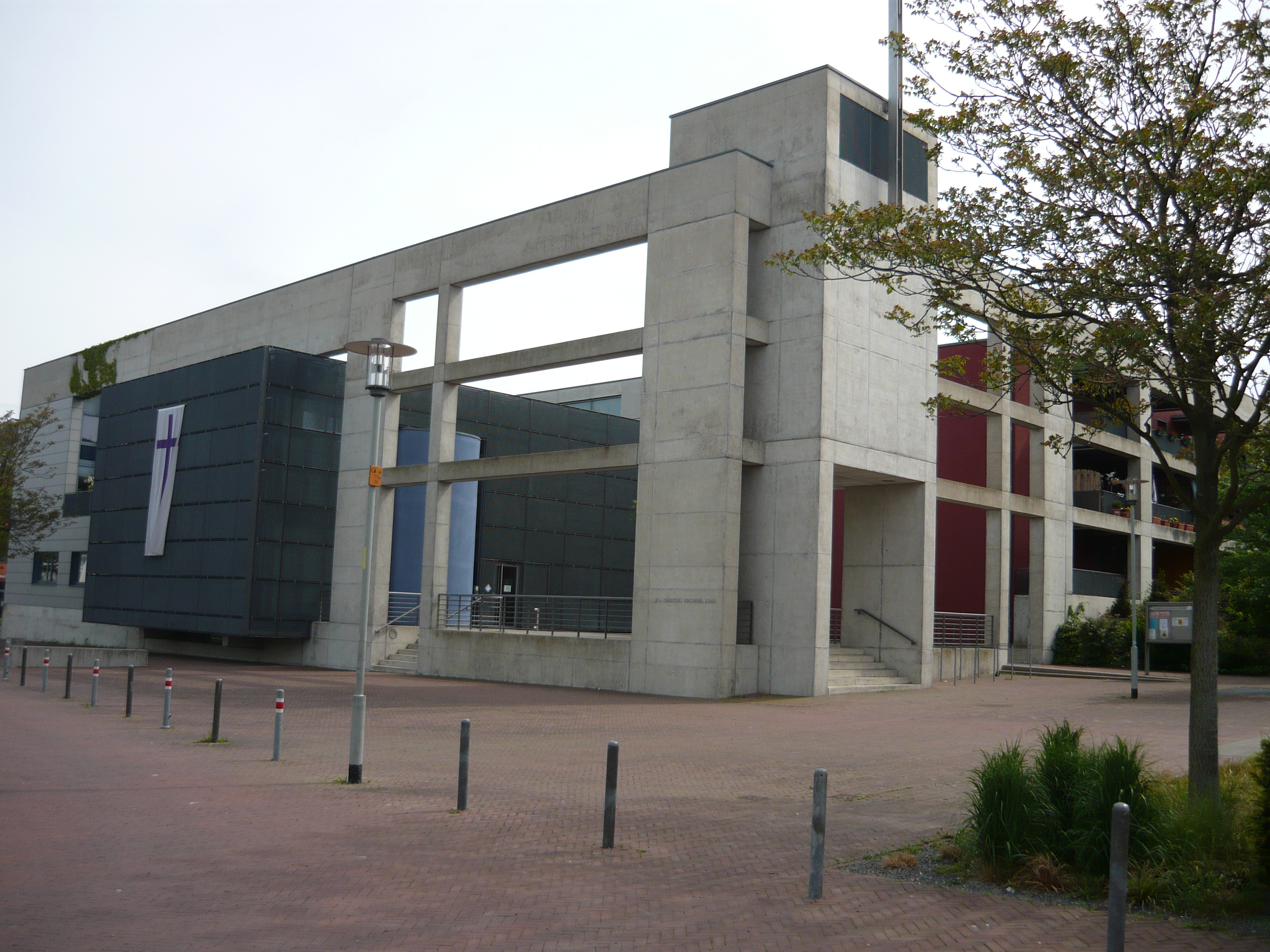
Kronsberg Church Centre, May 2012

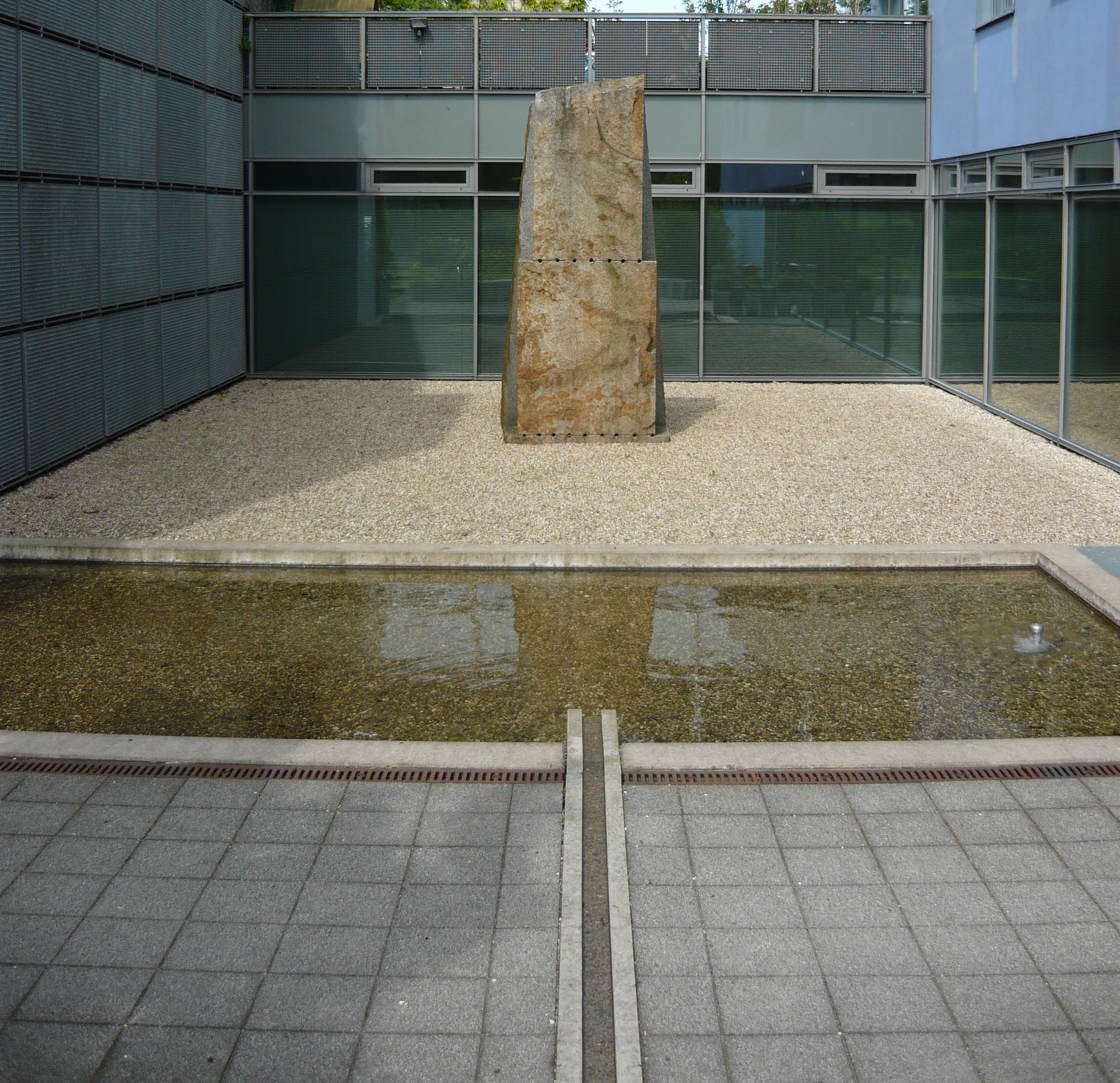
Rückriem-Stone, May 2012

The Evangelical Kronsberg Church Centre (German: Evangelisches Kirchenzentrum Kronsberg) is a place of worship in the Kronsberg neighbourhood of Hanover, in Lower Saxony, Germany. The Church belongs to the St. Johannis-Kirchengemeinde Bemerode parish, within the Evangelical-Lutheran Church of Hanover. The church centre is a simultaneum, hosting Baptists as well as Lutherans for prayer services.

== History ==
The Kronsberg neighbourhood was created to house the World Expo 2000, after Hanover received the contract for the event on 14 June 1990. Submissions were accepted for the design of the Kronsberg Church Center. In a selection on 26 May 1998, the winning design, created by Bernhard Hirche of Hamburg, was chosen.

The Kronsberg Church Centre was initially planned as an ecumenical project. However, after the Roman Catholic Diocese of Hildesheim withdrew from the project, the Hanover City Evangelical Lutheran Church Synod became the sole carrier, in cooperation with the Society for Building and Housing Hanover (GBH).

The construction of the church building began on 17 May 1999. On 8 October 2000, the Kronsberg Church Centre was inaugurated with a mass and festivities. Construction costs totaled approximately €5.5 million. They were paid by the Church of Hanover; the Hanover City Evangelical Lutheran Church Association; and the Hanover Housing Association.

The first Lutheran pastor at the Church Centre was Hans Joachim Schliep. Arriving in April 1999, Schliep was responsible for much of the creation and development of the parish in Kronsberg. He left the parish in August 2008.

Beginning in 2004, the Kronsberg Church Centre formed a loose partnership with the Church of Christ the King in Bradley Stoke, Greater Bristol, to allow that church's adherents to worship at Kronsberg. Since 1 September 2005, the Baptist Kronsberg Evangelical Free Church Congregation also worships at the Church Centre.

== Design of the Church ==
The Church Centre was created in the style of a monastery and rendered simply in concrete and glass. Around the Brunnenhof ("Paradise," a leafy area used for events) are 25 apartments, as well as apartments for the sexton and the pastor. At the Brunnenhof stands a statue, crafted by German sculptor Ulrich Rückriem, using granite bleu de vire from Normandy.

The church's interior is glazed on three sides. On the fourth side, the glass is a differently-tinted, translucent blue. In sunny afternoon weather, a hidden window allows light to fall on the wall of the altar. Glass artist Jochem Poensgen from Soest, Westphalia designed the well-lighted space. He also built a glass door in front of a meditation area.

The simple altar is made of smooth concrete and hangs freely. The baptismal font is embedded in the altar. The Easter candle stands on a stone from the Sea of Galilee.

The Church Centre was one of the exhibits at the World Expo 2000.

Today, the Kronsberg Church Centre holds church services in varying formats, including film, music, and literature. It also hosts other events, such as exhibitions and concerts.

== Bells ==
The bells that now hang at the Church Centre were taken from St. Ansgar's Church in Hanover. In a church service on 2 Advent 2001, the bells were presented:

- Bell 1: (610 kg) - Symbolizing Revelation 21:5: "Christ saith, Behold, I make all things new! I am Alpha and Omega, the beginning and the end."
- Bell 2: (383 kg) - Symbolizing Romans 12:12b: "Be patient in all tribulations"
- Bell 3: (290 kg) - Symbolizing Romans 12:12c: "Keep in prayer"
- Bell 4: (219 kg) - Symbolizing Romans 12:12a: "Rejoicing in hope"

== Photo gallery ==
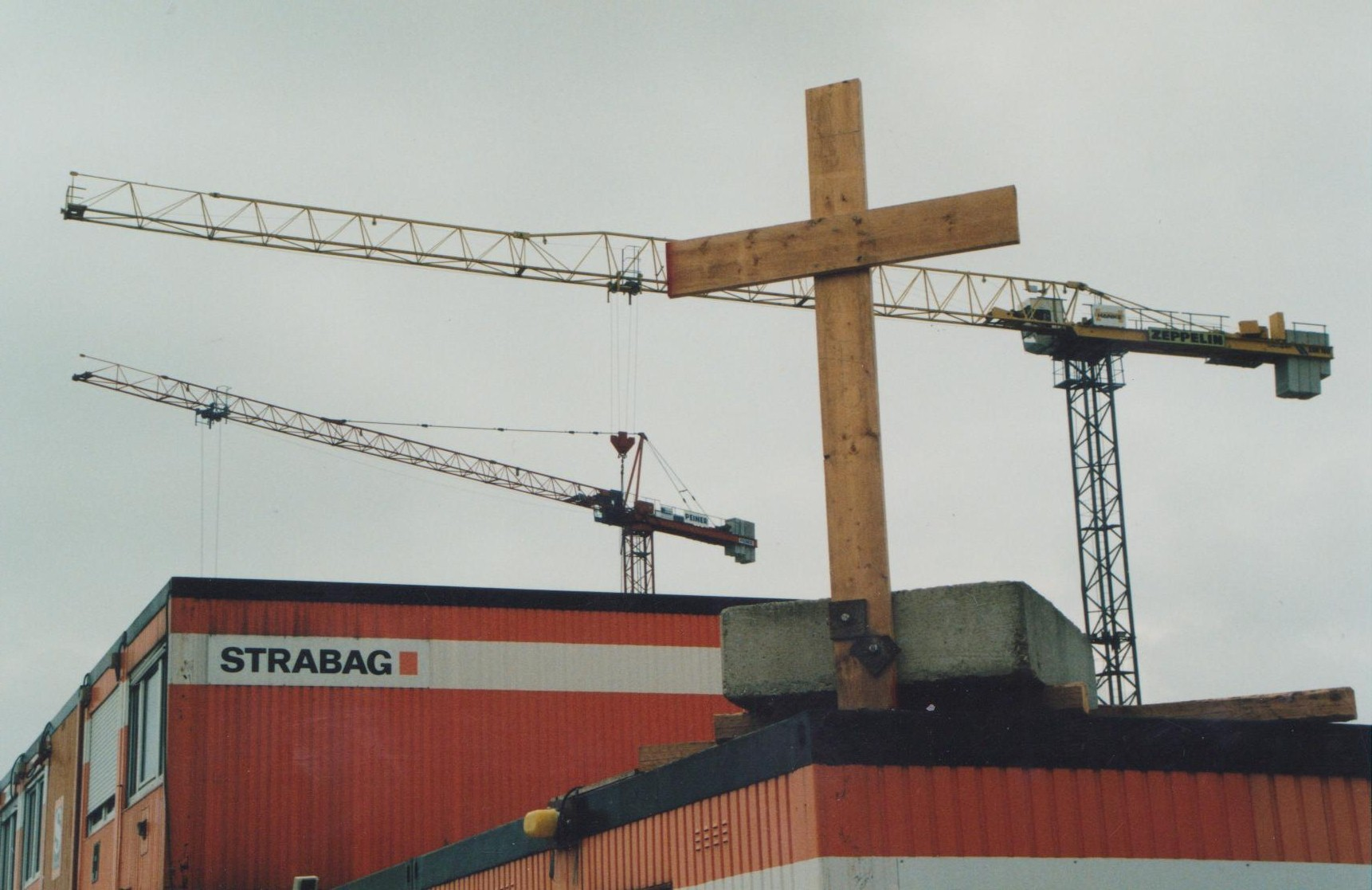
Church container during the construction of the Church Centre

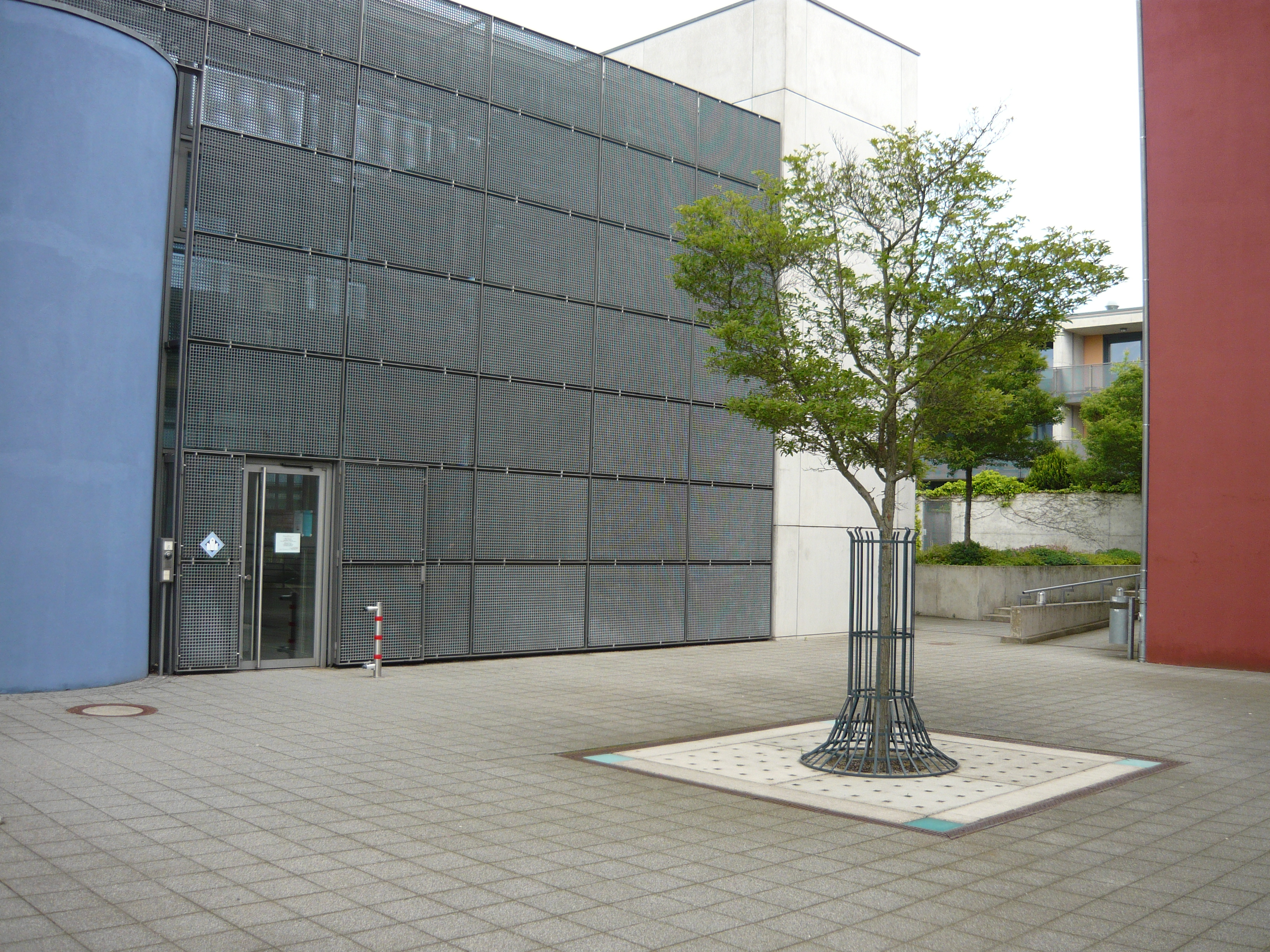
The entrance to the church

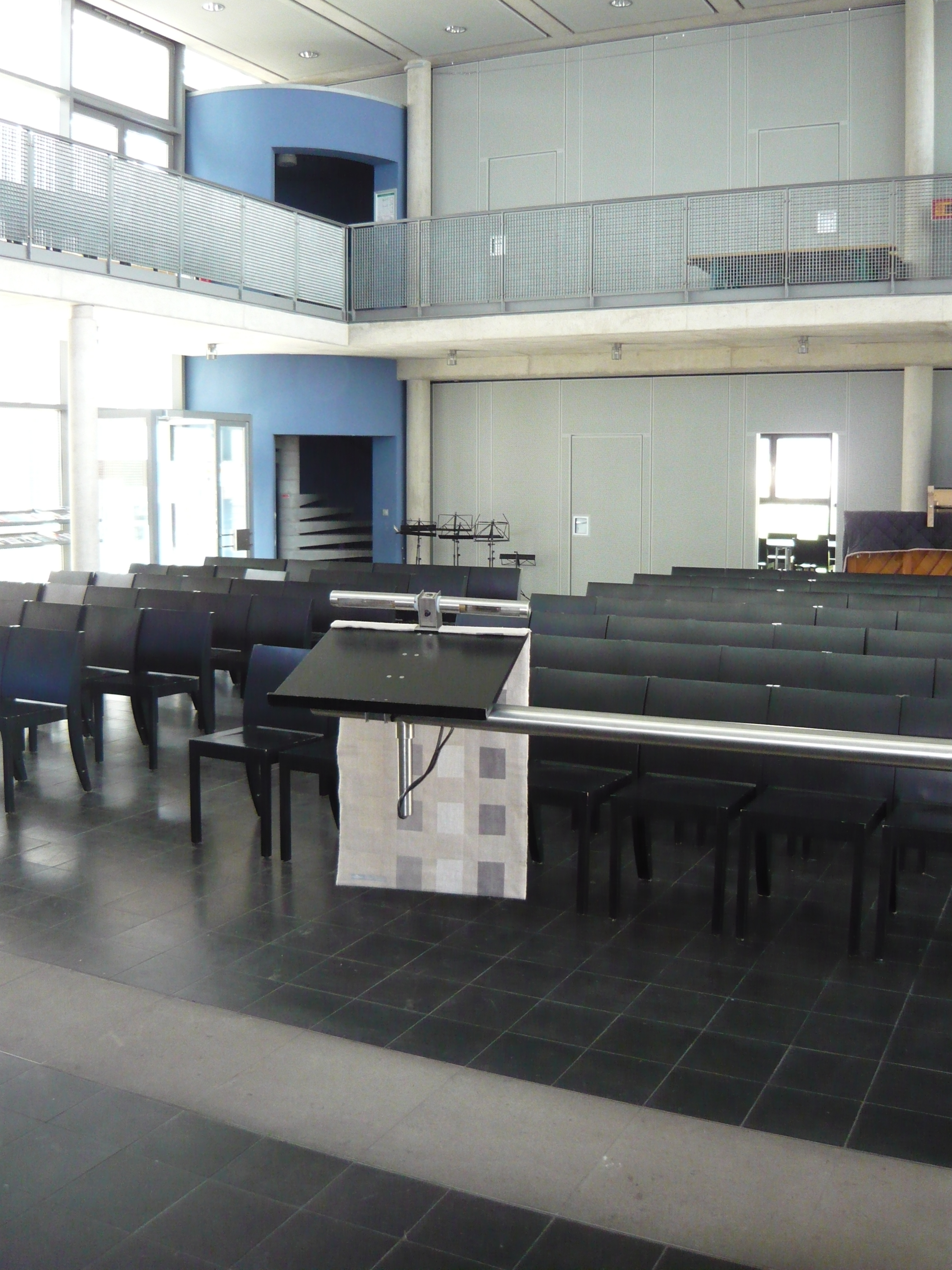
Interior seating

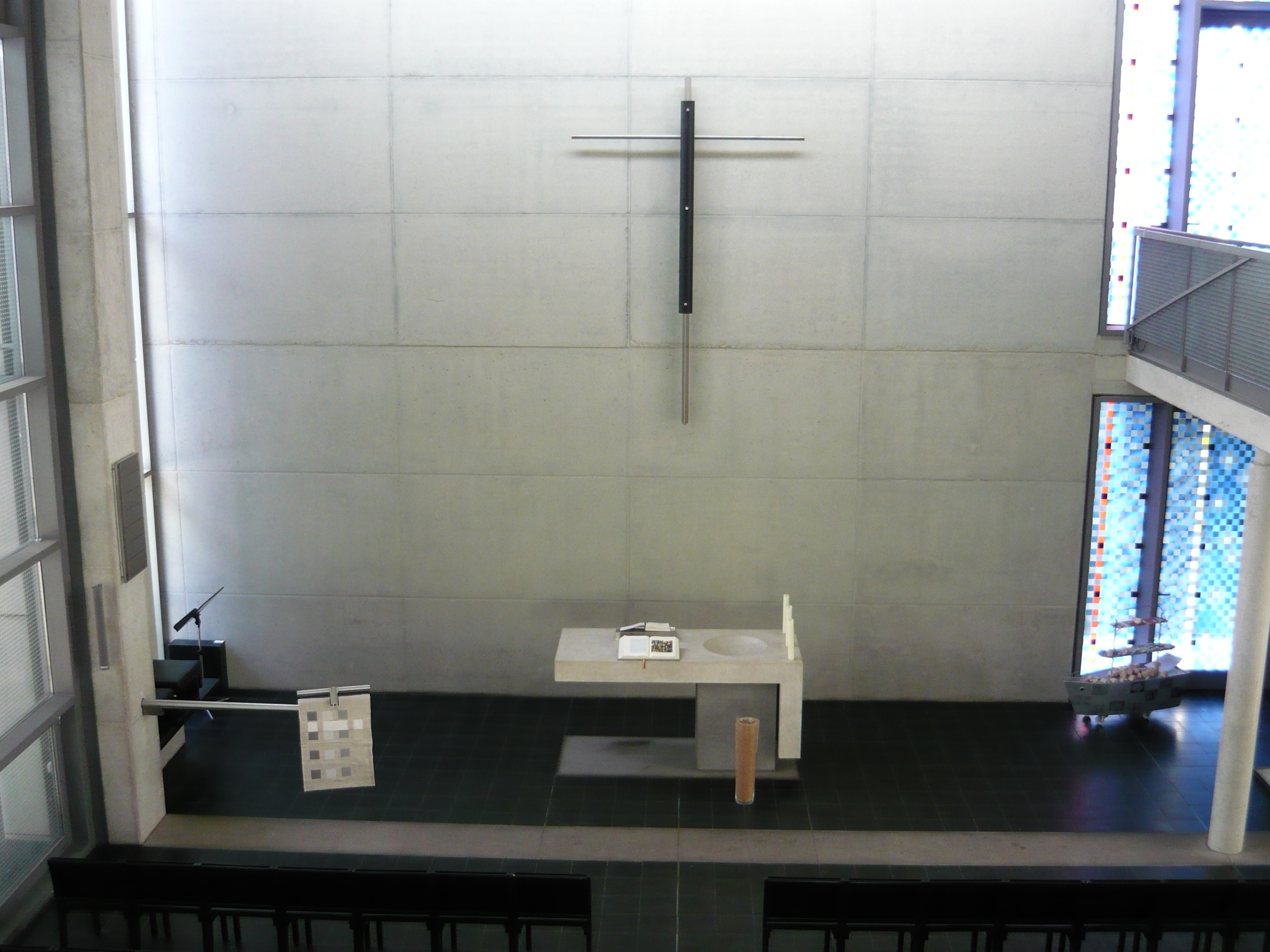
The church's interior

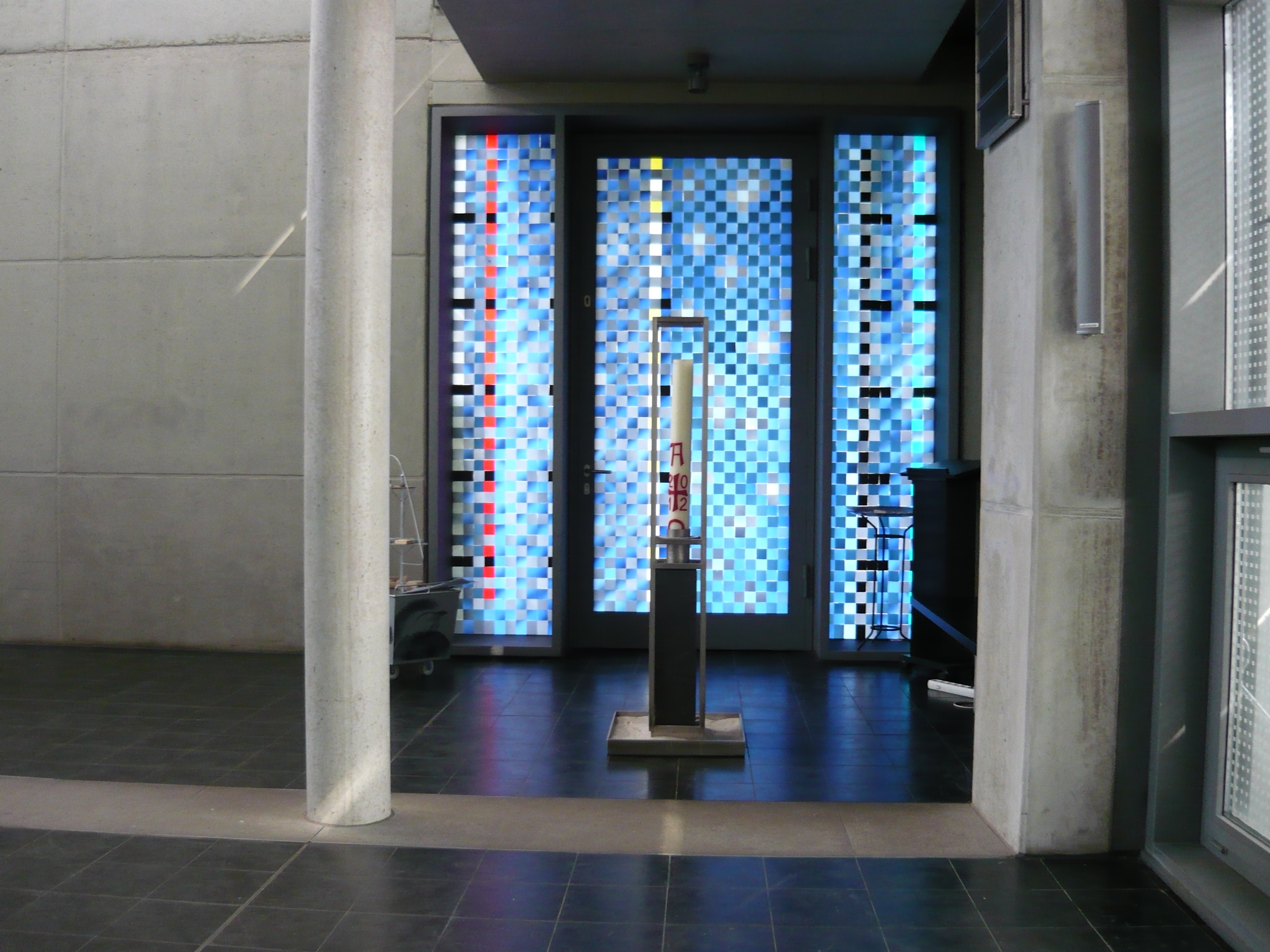
Easter Candle

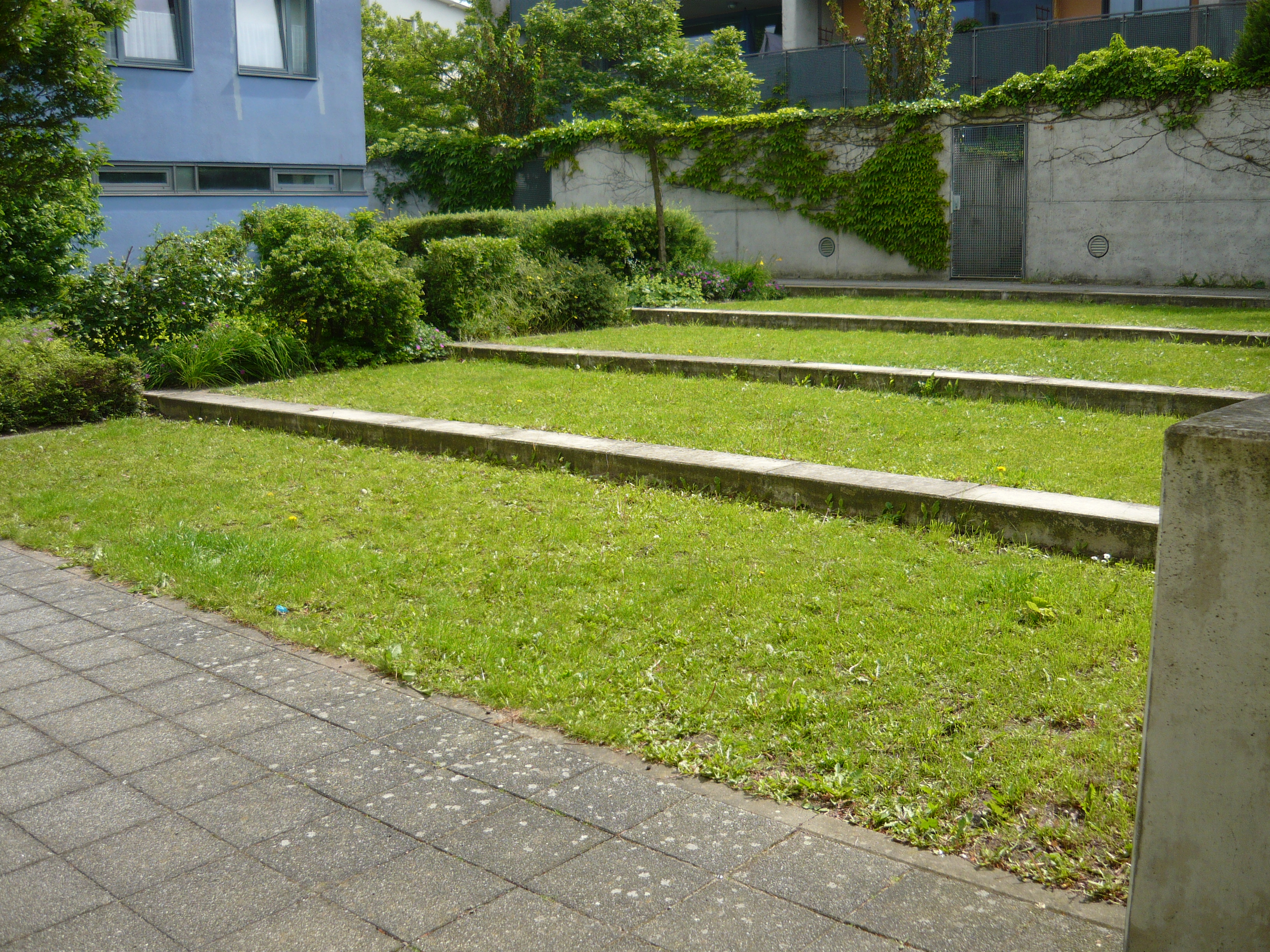
Outside, in the Brunnenhof

== Literature ==
- Hans Joachim Schliep, 10 Jahre Evangelisches Kirchenzentrum Hannover – Schrift zum 10-jährigen Jubiläum der Einweihung des. Ev. Kirchenzentrums Kronsberg, Hanover: Ev.-Luth. Kirchengemeinde St.Johannis Bemerode, 2010
- Hans Joachim Schliep, Was uns unbedingt angeht... - Kronsberger Predigten, Saarbrücken: Fromm-V., 2012, ISBN 978-3-8416-0369-2
- Till Wöhler, Neue Architektur – Sakralbauten, Berlin: Braun Publishing, 2005, ISBN 3-935455-75-5.
- Matthias Ludwig, Reinhard Mawick, Gottes neue Häuser. Kirchenbau des 21. Jahrhunderts in Deutschland, Frankfurt a. M.: Hansisches Druck- und Verlags-Haus, 2007, ISBN 978-3-938704-05-9, pp. 48ff. (Edition Chrismon)
- Dirk Riesener, Volksmission-zwischen Volkskirche und Republik. 75 Jahre Haus kirchlicher Dienste – früher Amt für Gemeindedienst – der Evangelisch-lutherischen Landeskirche Hannovers, Hanover: Lutherisches Verlagshaus, 2012, ISBN 978-3-7859-1080-1, pp. 556–559: Gemeindeaufbau auf dem Kronsberg.
