= Wilfried Behre =

German artist

Wilfried Behre, (born 1956 in Hannover, Germany) is an artist and sculptor.

== Life ==
Work in several goldsmith workshops, student of the Japanese stone sculptor Makoto Fujiwara at the Hochschule Hannover where he was examined as “Master student” (Meisterschüler) in 1992. Internationally active with sculptures in Germany, India, Malaysia and Vietnam. In 1994 Professor at the international Summer academy of fine arts in Salzburg, Austria. 1987 until 1990 co-founder and 1st Chairman of the "AUE-Creativeschool"" in Hannover. more: www.stoneart-behre.de

== Abbreviated list of works and exhibitions ==
- 1989 Begin of the project "Global Stoneline" with the creation of seven red granite sculptures at the river Leine and the lake Maschsee in Hannover.
- 1990 Public art action: "Object of Christmastrees".
- 1991 A marble sculpture on the summit of the mountain "Salzburger Hochthron" (1896m) in Austria and several sculptures in joint work for the "Toskanatrakt" in Salzburg.
- 1991 Joint work: Memorial stones for the victims of the Gulf War at the "Opernplatz Hannover", public handing over to the prime minister of the state of Lower Saxony, Gerhard Schröder.
- 1992 Fountain in the foyer of "Blind peoples association" ("Blindenverband") in Hannover, continued work on the project "Global Stoneline" and receipt of a grant from the state of Lower Saxony.
- 1994 A sculpture for the kindergarten of Fürstenbrunn near Salzburg, Austria.
- 1995 Sculpture "Sun fountain" ("Solarbrunnen"), Hannover.
- 1996/1997 Solo exhibition at the art society of Gehrden by Hannover, continued work on the project "Global Stoneline" and the "Wishing stone" ("Wünschestein").
- 1998 Solo exhibition in the Marktkirche, Hannover.
- 1998/2000 8 granite sculptures for the new built Computer Science building at Leibniz University Hannover.
- 2000/2001 Expo 2000-project "Town as garden" ("Stadt als Garten"), 12 limestone sculptures on the hill Kronsberg (118m), view point of the World Exhibition (Expo 2000) in Hannover,
- 2001 Goa (India), seven granite sculptures continuing the concept "Global Stoneline", of which four sculptures were created by Wilfried Behre (shaped only on the side facing the ground, partly polished).
- 2003 Completion of seven granite sculptures in Malaysia at the shore of the South China Sea as part of the "Global Stoneline" project.
- 2004 Continuing work on a granite sculpture (14 tons) near the lake Maschsee in Hannover.
- 2007 Global Stoneline in Nord Vietnam, Hai Phong, seven green granite sculpture
- Fountain Sculpture Norway Granit (ca.14t)
- 2009 Professor in China Academy of Art, and fountain sculpture China Granit
- more info: www.stoneart-behre.de
