= George F. Stooke =

English physician and medical missionary

George Stooke
- Born: March 1867; Bristol, England
- Died: 12 September 1907 (aged 40); Yichang, China
- Known for: Medical missionary

George Frederick Stooke (March 1867 – 12 September 1907) was an English physician and medical missionary who carried out his work with the Church of Scotland's Mission in Yichang, China, along the Yangtze river. Stooke was able to use his high degree of skill and knowledge to greatly increase the scope of the surgical department at the hospital in Yichang.

== Early life ==
George F Stooke was born in March 1867 in Bristol, England. At age 12, he traveled to China with his parents. His parents were coming to China in order to take command of the China Inland Mission sanatorium in Yantai. He spent his time playing music and chess and was enthusiastic about the Chinese language, medicine, and his call to be a missionary. He and his wife had a son, John Graham Stooke, born at the mission (b. 3 February 1905).

== Education ==
Stooke attended the CIM school and upon graduation went to Edinburgh to begin his study of medicine. He was an accomplished student and had several achievements and won many medals and bursaries. After five years, he graduated. During his medical education in Edinburgh, he tied himself with the Edinburgh Medical Missionary Society and Livingston Institute Memorial Hospital where he involved himself in the Christian efforts of the institution. When going to study in Edinburgh, Stooke's intention was to become a medical missionary. With that in mind, he applied to the Foreign Mission Committee of the Church of Scotland and was accepted.

== Journey ==
David Rankine, one of the doctors at the Church's Mission in China, died in the summer of 1899. Rankine, called for two doctors to replace him; in a dying message to the church he stated that a lone physician would again die due to the quantity of the work. The Church needed another doctor to volunteer to offer their service at the Mission and George Stooke quickly stepped forward. In March 1900 he arrived in Yichang and quickly began to learn the language. He wrote a short entry for the East of Asia Magazine entitled, “A Trip in Summer through the Yangtze Gorges” where he describes his travels from Shanghai to Yichang and includes several images of the landscapes he encountered.

== Missionary service ==
He married his wife Jessie Graham, also a doctor, in 1901. In the same year, he began his hospital and dispensary work alongside his wife. Stooke was assisted in the hospital by the first missionary nurse, Minnie Bere. The expertise of Stooke and his colleagues attracted people throughout the whole city and district and as a result the amount of work in the hospital was increasing. The hospital constantly had full wards and each day there were around 100 patients. It was also common for Stooke to respond to calls to serve officials and other people in their homes. Stooke also took medical care of the community. He often preached on Sunday evenings at the English church services; he also often played the organ. After six years of service at Yichang he went home on furlough. He returned in the summer of 1907, and spent some time with his parents in Yantai.

== Legacy ==
Stooke died from Cholera at Yichang in 1907. The medical missionary body lost a brilliant member in China who had a large impact on the people there and on the workings of the hospital. He wrote about “I-Ch'ang Fever,” providing information from his research about its etiology, symptoms, and treatment, as well as specific case studies for the use of other medical professionals to use as the basis of future studies. He brought his knowledge to help develop the surgical department there. He was known for his thoroughness not only in his medical profession but preaching and organ playing.
