= Thomas Bere =

Thomas Bere may refer to:

- Thomas Bere (Bodmin MP), Member of Parliament for Bodmin 1391, 1395–7
- Thomas Bere (1652–1725), Member of Parliament for Tiverton 1690–1710, 1715–25
