= Frederick Behre =

American artist

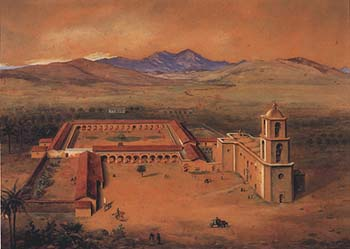
An 1894 painting by Fred Behre depicts a Spanish mission.Watercolor and gouache.

Frederick John Behre (December 21, 1863 – March 10, 1942) was an American artist born in San Francisco, California.

Behre spent some years working for Hubert Howe Bancroft in Berkeley, California as an artist-designer. By 1888 he had established himself as an active member in the local art scene in Pasadena, where he helped found the Artists League of Southern California in 1893. Behre worked mostly in oils and painted still lifes. He died in 1942 in Los Angeles.
