= Minnie Bere =

Scottish medical missionary (1875–1910)

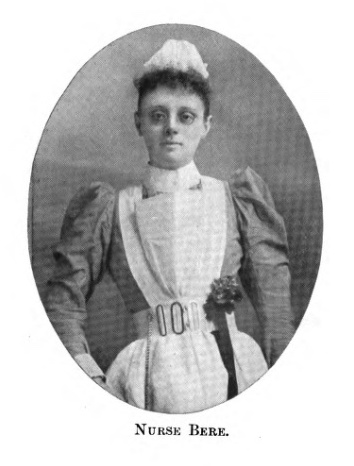
- Born: 6 January 1875; India
- Died: 22 November 1910 (aged 35); Yichang, China
- Occupations: Nurse, Medical Missionary

Nurse Minnie A. Bere, D.C.S. (6 January 1875 - 22 November 1910) was a Scottish medical missionary. Bere was the first nurse to carry out foreign mission work for the Church of Scotland's Mission in the newly founded hospital in Yichang, China. She trained Chinese nurses in the hospital and assisted teaching in the local schools in Yichang. She documented her life in China through letters she sent to the Angus and Mearns Council of the Church of Scotland's Woman's Guild.

== Early life and becoming a missionary ==
Minnie Bere was born on 6 January 1875 in India. Because of her commitment to the Church, she was commissioned to be a "Deaconess of the Church of Scotland (D.C.S.)." In the spring of 1901, the Angus and Mearns Council of the Church of Scotland's Woman's Guild elected her to represent the movement abroad. Bere was to be a church missionary for five years at the Rankine Memorial Hospital in Yichang, China.

== Missionary work ==
=== Journey to China ===
On 4 November 1901 Bere left Edinburgh on a six-week voyage to Shanghai. She practiced the Chinese language with other passengers on board. After arriving in Shanghai on 14 December she boarded another steamer to go to Hankou and, ultimately, Yichang. Bere arrived in Yichang on Christmas Eve, 24 December 1901.

=== Rankine Memorial Hospital ===
Bere immediately joined the hospital staff at David Rankine Memorial Hospital the day she arrived. The staff included two doctors - Dr. George F. Stooke and Dr. Graham - and five members of the Women's Association of the Church of Scotland - Miss Fraser, Miss Moore, Miss MacGill, Nurse Bere, and Mrs. Rankine.

The hospital opened in May 1901. The complex housed separate wards for the Chinese, foreigners, women, and opium patients. Next to the wards was the hospital dispensary, operating room, out-patient area, and chapel. In The China Medical Missionary Journal, Drs. Stooke and Graham describe the chapel as the place where "the evangelist [hospital staff] preaches to the patients waiting to be seen (152)". At the time of Bere's arrival, a new isolation ward was being constructed to better accommodate patients with smallpox, cholera, malaria, etc. It was the only hospital that had a medical doctor to serve the natives and foreigners within a 500-mile radius.

=== Hospital duties ===
Bere used her recent hospital training in Scotland to assist Dr. Stooke and Dr. Graham in the hospital. She trained three Chinese women on how to make, clean, and repair hospital bed covers and patient garments. She taught them how to properly care for surgical tools and prepare the operating theatre for a new surgical procedure. Bere also had coolies under her direction. She worked to reform the "great class distinctions in China" the coolies and the rest of the natives believed in (Bere, 18). She demonstrated to them how to feed and clean patients while simultaneously reminding them of the dignity of their work.

When she was not teaching the three women or the coolies, Bere was actively improving the hospital and Church. In her 14th letter to the Angus and Mearns Council, Bere states that "besides spring-cleaning, I have fresh mattress, pillow, and screen covers to make, and I am also planning two baby baskets to keep the little ones out of their mamma's beds" (36). Her improvements proved to help the hospital financially. Some missionaries who passed through Yichang and noticed the improving hospital donated £5 per year in the naming of a hospital bed. Like her other hospital colleagues, she sometimes cared for foreign patients in their homes around Yichang. Bere's inpatient work served well for the Church of Scotland because she preached to her patients in the wards.

=== Community duties and life ===
On top of her duties as a nurse, Bere possessed other roles within the community. She constantly preached the Church doctrine. To better integrate with the community, a private teacher visited her home every day to teach her both oral and written Chinese. Her examinations included speaking scripture passages to the natives and translating scriptures passages between English and Chinese on paper. Once she became proficient, Bere began to accompany other Church missionaries to visit neighboring villages to preach the Church doctrine. On Sundays, she taught the Chinese children how to sing common Christian hymns. During some Sunday services, she gave a sermon at the native church. Also, Bere taught in the local day and boarding schools when her colleagues fell ill or were on a leave of absence.

Bere paid close attention to one girl she cared for in the hospital. The fifteen-year-old girl was a beggar and was admitted to the hospital to have her hand amputated. Upon learning she was an orphan, Bere adopted her and named her "An-In." Then, she baptized An-In into the Church and had her attend the local girl's boarding school.

In order to stay in close contact with the women of the Agnus and Mearns Council, she wrote letters to them. She vividly described the work and travels of her and her fellow missionaries in Yichang. She also used these letters to ask the women to send linens and cloths to increase the inventory of materials for the hospital.

== Legacy ==
Minnie Bere went on leave on 22 January 1907, going back to Edinburgh. She returned to Yichang in August 1908. In November 1910, she contracted cholera when she was caring for a cholera patient. She died from the disease on 22 November 1910 in Yichang. She was 35. With her death, she left behind her adopted daughter, An-In. She spread the influence of the Church of Scotland in China through her involvement in the local community as well as her detailed written documentation of the work of other medical missionaries. In her own words in her first letter to the Angus and Mearns Council, she states that "in medical mission work one has the best opportunity for faithful service and witnessing for Christ" (Bere, 2). She also has a legacy of using her knowledge to make progress in the hospital and Chinese hospital staff. Her missionary life is forever recorded in her letters to the Angus and Mearns Council, which are now accessible online.
