= Kronsberg =

Coordinates: 52°19′38″N 9°50′01″E

Kronsberg is a hill about six kilometres in length and dominates the surrounding areas up to 30 meters, just outside Hanover. The highest point on the Kronsberg is the scenic hill with 118 meters (387 ft). The only taller hill in the city is the "Monte Müllo" landfill site, standing at 122 metres (400 ft). It mainly consists of marl.

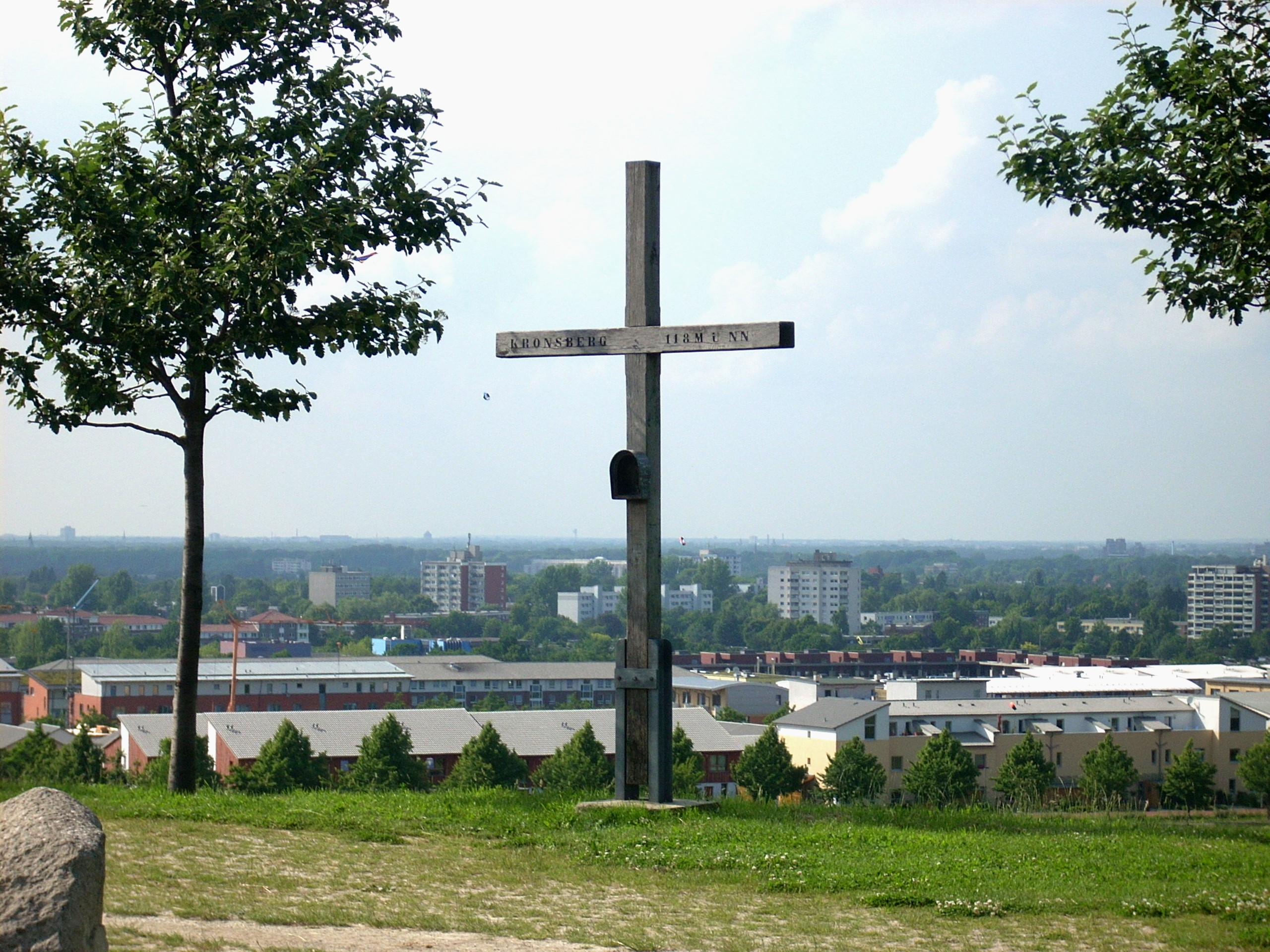
Kronsberg

== Expo-settlement Kronsberg ==
The Expo-settlement Kronsberg is a district of Kirchrode-Bemerode-Wülferode in Hanover and has approximately 7,300 residents (2013). The district emerged in the late 1990s in connection with the EXPO 2000 event. People live in 2,600 apartments, 150 condominiums and about 400 private townhouses, as well as semi-detached and detached houses. There are two neighbourhood parks and meeting places for all age groups. The front gardens and the courtyards of the individual building blocks are varied and diversified in order to achieve above-average housing quality. There is an extensive infrastructure facilities with schools, kindergartens, shops, the community center Krokus and the Evangelical Church Centre Kronsberg available. The project is showcased in the Crystal exhibition pavilion in London as a global standard for integrated construction. The World Cities Summit 2012 in Singapore also paid tribute to the residential area as one of the world's hundred most innovative infrastructure projects.

== Literature ==
- Klaus Mlynek: Kronsberg, in Stadtlexikon Hannover, S. 372
- Hermann Löns: Hinter dem Kronsberg, 1904
- Hermann Löns: Auf dem Kronsberge, 1904
