= List of waterbodies in Saxony-Anhalt =

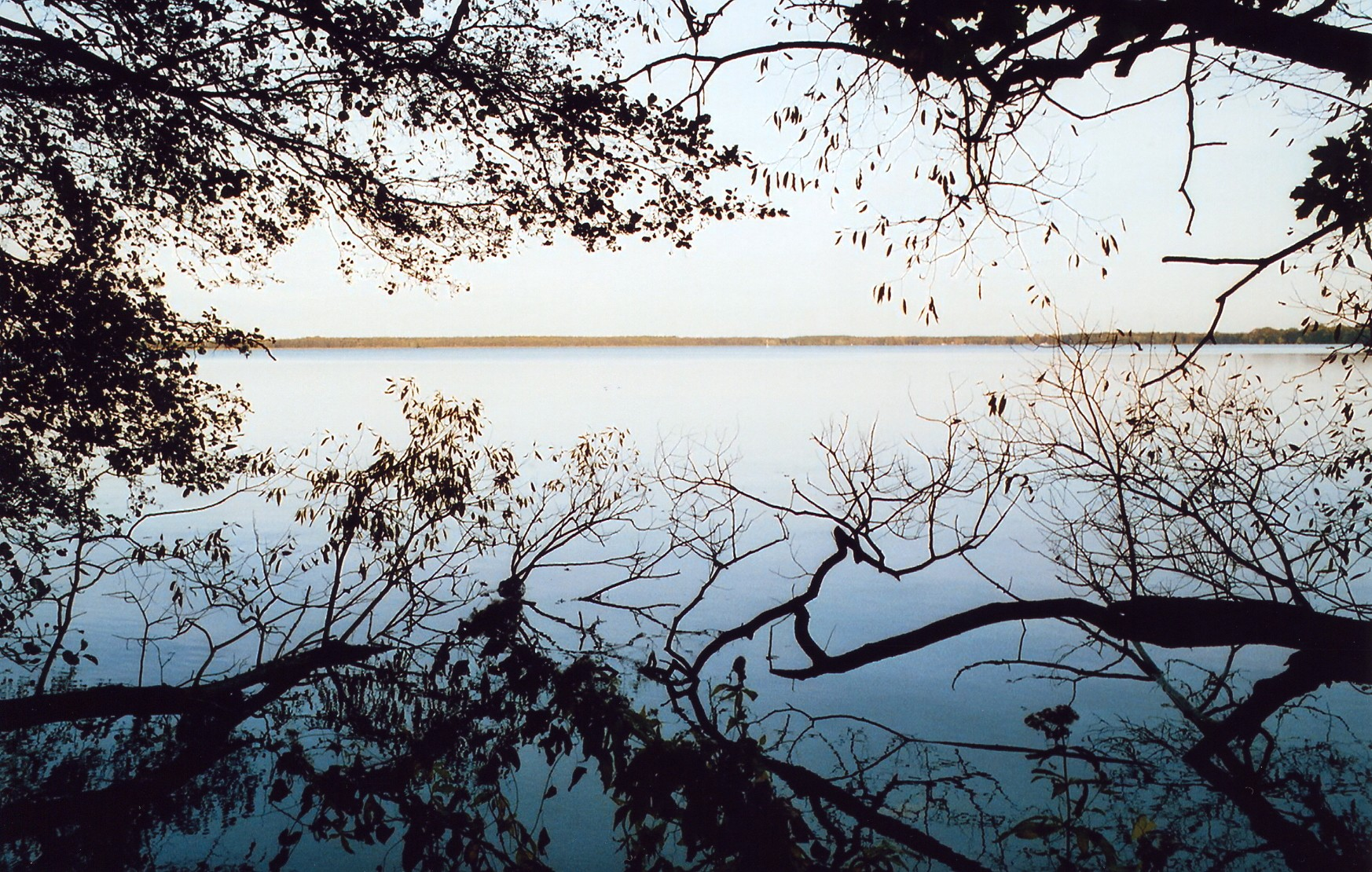
The Arendsee

== Waterbodies ==
Waterbody; Length in km; in Saxony-Anhalt flowing through; (confluence of ...); Remarks

=== Elbe ===
Elbe; 1.091 km; rises in the Giant Mountains of the Czech Republic at a height of ca. 1,386 m, flows through or touches the Czech Republic, Saxony, Saxony-Anhalt, Brandenburg, Lower Saxony, Mecklenburg-Western Pomerania, Hamburg, Schleswig-Holstein

Elbe tributaries and water bodies with their confluence in Saxony-Anhalt

- Aland
  - Biese
  - Milde
  - Uchte
  - Augraben
- Havel
  - Königsgraben
- Tanger
- Ihle
- Ehle

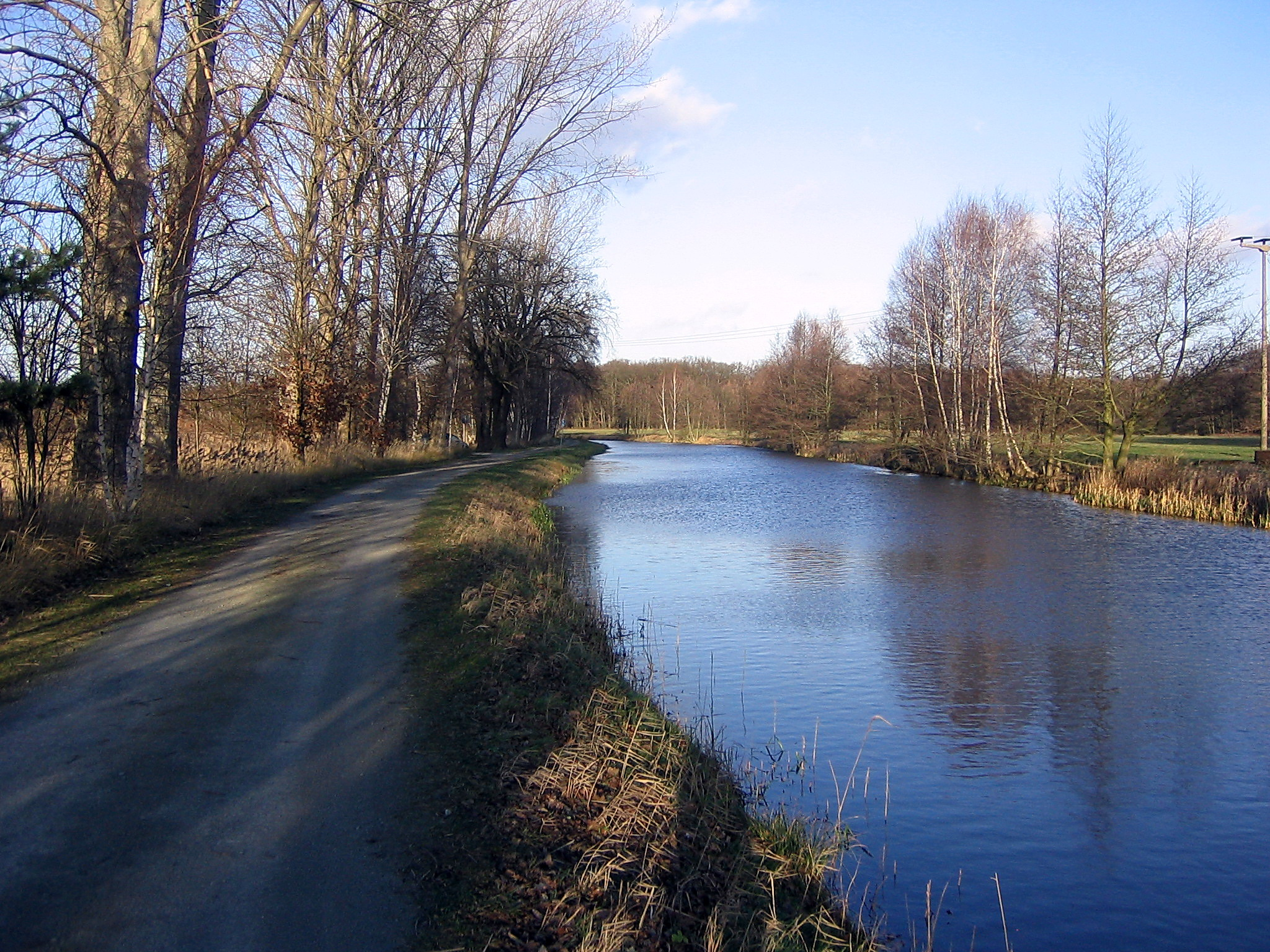
The Ohre near Calvörde

- Ohre
  - Schrote
    - Siegrenne
    - Sieggraben
    - Kreuzgrund
    - Faule Renne
    - Große Sülze
- Klinke
  - Eulengraben
    - Großer Wiesengraben
      - Kleiner Wiesengraben
  - Künette
- Sülze
- Nuthe (Elbe)
- Saale
  - Bode
    - Selke
    - Holtemme
    - Kalte Bode
    - Hassel
      - Brummeckebach
        - Sellegraben
      - Murmelbach
      - Hagenbach

Sautal (left)

  - Fuhne
    - Strengbach
    - Riede
  - Wipper (Harz)
    - Mühlgraben
    - Eine
      - Wiebeck
      - Leine
      - Schwennecke
      - Mukarehne
      - Langetalbach
    - Rote Welle
    - Walbke, also known as the Ölgrundbach
    - Hadeborn
    - Alte Wipper, also known as the Regenbeck
    - Stockbach
    - Fuchsbach
    - Talbach
    - Hagenbach
    - Ochsenpfuhlbach
    - Dorfbach
    - Sengelbach
    - Brumbach
    - Hasselbach
    - Schmale Wipper
    - Horla
    - Wolfsberger Wipper
    - Schmale Else
  - Schlenze
    - Fleischbach
    - Lobach
    - Rüsterbach
      - Grift
  - Salza
    - Laweke
    - Würde
    - Querne
    - Weida
    - Böse Sieben
      - Glume
        - Wilder Graben
      - Wolferoder Bach
      - Saugrund
      - Pfaffengrund
      - Goldgrund
      - Kliebigsbach
      - Dippelsbach
      - Vietsbach/Goldbach
  - Götsche
  - White Elster
  - Gerwische
  - Reide
- Geisel
  - Unstrut
    - Helme
      - Rohne
        - Westerbach
      - Gonna
        - Ungeheurer Graben
        - Botzemannsgraben
        - Heimbach
        - Riestedter Bach
      - Thyra
- Mulde
  - Pelze
- Black Elster

Elbe tributaries and waterbodies with their confluence outside Saxony-Anhalt

- Jeetze
- Salzwedel Dumme
- Wustrower Dumme
- Parnitz

=== Special rivers ===
- Ilse

(via Oker, Aller to the Weser)

== Canals ==
- Elster-Saale Canal: planned, largely constructed but never completed waterway between the Saale (south of Halle (Saale)) and Leipzig.
- Canal sections in Halle (Saale): planned, partially constructed but never completed canal sections near the Saale as part of the planned but never finished southern arm of the Mittelland Canal.

== Standing waterbodies ==
Waterbody; Waterbody system; Area in ha; location of the nearest significant settlement; Remarks

The standing waterbodies are sorted by type. Their boundaries are however, somewhat fluid.

=== Reservoirs and forebays ===
1. Kelbra Reservoir; Helme, Unstrut, Saale, Elbe; 600 ha; near Kelbra; bathing lake
2. Rappbode Reservoir; Bode, Saale, Elbe; 395 ha; near Hasselfelde
3. Wendefurth Reservoir; Bode, Hassel, Saale, Elbe; 78.0 ha; near Wendefurth
4. Wippra Reservoir; Wipper, Saale, Elbe; 38.5 ha; near Wippra
5. Königshütte Reservoir; Bode, Saale, Elbe; 32.0 ha; Königshütte near Wernigerode
6. Hassel Forebay; Hassel, Bode, Saale, Elbe; 25.0 ha; near Hasselfelde
7. Rappbode Forebay; Bode, Saale, Elbe; 24.3 ha; near Hasselfelde
8. Zillierbach Reservoir; Zillierbach, Bode, Saale, Elbe; 23.0 ha; near Wernigerode
9. Frankenteich; Rödelbachgraben, Selke (river), Bode, Saale, Elbe; 11.0 ha; near Straßberg in the Harz
10. Kiliansteich Reservoir; Büschengraben, Rödelbachgraben, Selke, Bode, Saale, Elbe; 17.3 ha; near Straßberg in the Harz
11. Upper Kiliansteich; Büschengraben, Rödelbachgraben, Selke, Bode, Saale, Elbe; 17.3 ha; near Straßberg in the Harz
12. Teufelsteich; Teufelsgrundbach, Selke, Bode, Saale, Elbe; 19.9 ha; near Harzgerode
13. Birnbaumteich; Birnbaumbach; 4.5 ha; near Neudorf (Harz)
14. Gondelteich; Uhlenbach; 4.2 ha; near Friedrichsbrunn
15. Großer Siebersteinteich; Siebersteinbach; 4.2 ha; near Ballenstedt
16. Bremer Teich; Bach vom Bremer Teich; 3.7 ha; near Gernrode
17. Kunstteich Neudorf; unnamed, tributary of the schmalen Wipper, schmale Wipper, Wipper, Saale, Elbe, 4.2 ha; near Neudorf
18. Kunstteich Ballenstedt; Garnwinde, Sauerbach; 3 ha; near Ballenstedt
19. Fürstenteich; Teufelsbach; 2.5 ha; near Silberhütte
20. Neuer Teich; Hagentalsbach; 2.4 ha; near Gernrode
21. Kleiner Siebersteinteich; Siebersteinbach; 1.8 ha; near Ballenstedt
22. Bergrat-Müller-Teich; Friedenstalbach; 1.3 ha; near Friedrichsbrunn
23. Erichsburger Teich; Friedenstalbach; 1.1 ha; near Harzgerode

=== Open cast mine lakes ===
1. Goitzsche; near the Mulde, Elbe; 2500 ha; southeast of Bitterfeld
2. Geiseltalsee; Saale, Elbe; 1842 to 1900 ha; south of Halle (Saale); former brown coal open cast mine to 2011 flooded, Original smaller lakes merged: August 2008
3. Muldestausee; Mulde, Elbe; 605 ha; east of Bitterfeld
4. Concordiasee; flooded until 2015. 600 ha; between Nachterstedt and Schadeleben; bank collapse of 2 million cubic metres on 19 Juli 2009. 3 dead
5. Raßnitzer See; White Elster, Saale, Elbe; 310 ha; east of Merseburg; former brown coal open cast mine flooded until 2000,
6. Wallendorfer See; White Elster, Saale, Elbe; 338 ha; east of Merseburg; former brown coal open cast mine flooded until 2000
7. Gremminer See; Elbe; 543 ha; west of Gräfenhainichen; former brown coal open cast mine (still flooded) Golpa-Nord, Ferropolis museum and event location
8. Gröberner See; Elbe; 366 ha; east of Gräfenhainichen; former brown coal open cast mine (still flooded) Gröbern
9. Barleber See; Elbe; 105 ha; near Magdeburg and Barleben; bathing lake
10. Paupitzscher See; Mulde, Elbe; 100 ha; between Bitterfeld and Delitzsch; largest part in Saxony
11. Hufeisensee; ca. 70 ha; former brown coal open cast mine and gravel pit in the borough of Halle (Saale)
12. Neustädter See; Elbe; 60 ha; near Magdeburg
13. Posthornteiche; 2 Teiche; 20 ha and 5 ha; former Braunkohlentiefbau, near Halle (Saale)
14. Heidesee; 12.5 ha; former brown coal open cast mine, near Halle (Saale)
15. Rattmannsdorfer See; 76 ha; former gravel pit, near Halle (Saale)
16. Hohenweidener See; 13 ha; former gravel pit, near Halle (Saale)
17. Osendorfer See; 22 ha; former brown coal open cast mine in Halle (Saale)
18. Angersdorfer Teiche; 2 Teiche 6 ha and 3 ha; former clay pit, near Halle (Saale)
19. Runstedter See; 23 ha former brown coal open cast mine near Braunsbedra
20. Bergwitzsee; Elbe; 180 ha; south of Wittenberg near Bergwitz; former brown coal open cast mine, bathing lake
21. Adria Gravel Pit; Mulde, Elbe; 12 ha; near Dessau; former gravel pit for motorway construction, bathing lake
22. Gerwisch Gravel Lake
23. Salbker See 1 and 2 in Magdeburg Southeast (remains of former gravel pits originally several hectares in area )
24. Mondsee; ca. 38 ha; near Hohenmölsen; flooded 1989 to 1991

=== Water management storage ===
1. Wettelrode Storage Reservoir; Erlbach; 4 ha; west of Wettelrode
2. Schmon Storage Reservoir; Schmoner Bach; 2.2 ha; west of Schmon

=== Retention basins ===
==== Partially impounded retention basins ====
1. Kalte Bode flood retention basin; Bode, Saale, Elbe; 58.9 ha; near Königshütte in the Harz

==== Normally non-impounded retention basins ====
1. Stöbnitz Retention Basin; Saale, Elbe; 21.5 ha; northeast of Öchlitz in Merseburg-Querfurt
2. Schrote Retention Basin; Elbe; 10.0 ha; west of Magdeburg
3. Gleinaer Grund Retention Basin; Geisel; 6.3 ha; southwest of Mücheln

=== Natural lakes and bogs ===
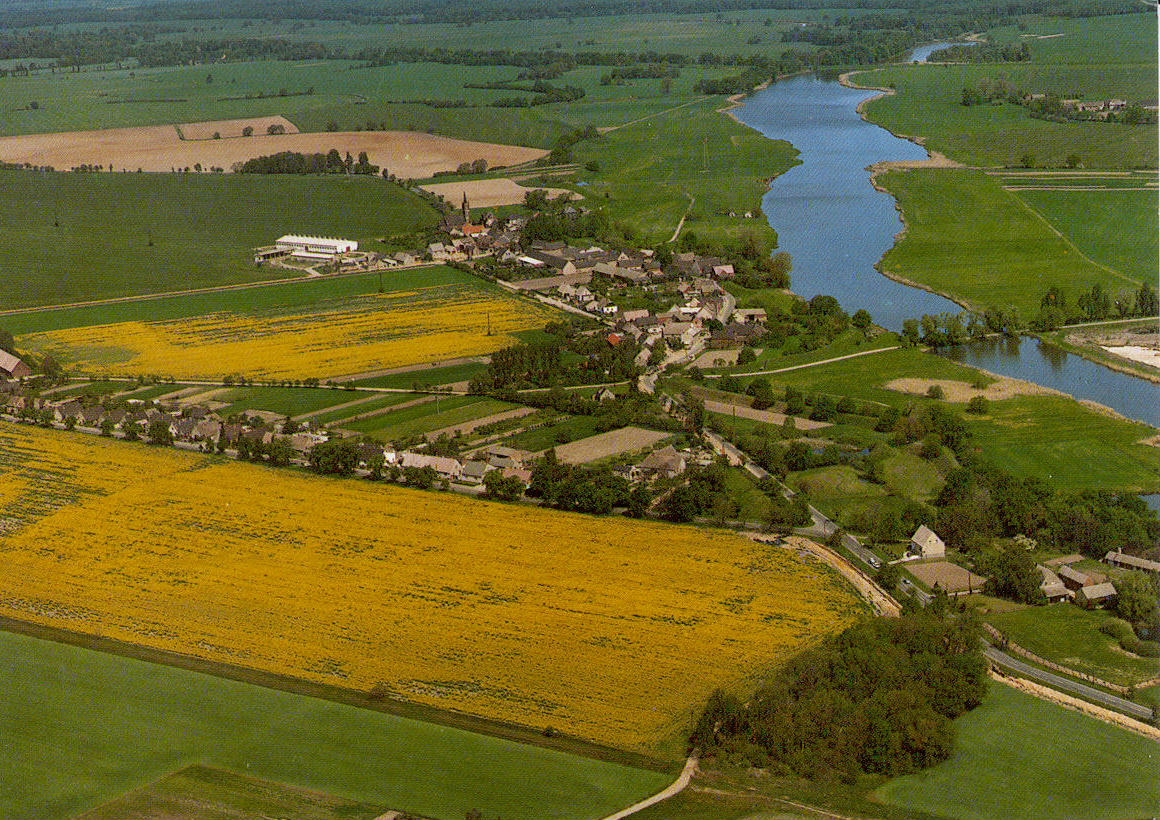
Schönitzer See aerial photo

1. Arendsee; Elbe; 514 ha; near Arendsee (Altmark); bathing lake
2. Süßer See; Saale, Elbe, Böse Sieben, Salza; 247 ha; Seeburg
3. Schönitzer See; Elbe; 145 ha; near Riesigk; Altarm der Elbe
4. Bindersee; Saale, Elbe; 25 ha; east of Seeburg
5. Kernersee; Saale, Elbe; 17 ha; east of Seeburg
6. Schönfeld-Kamerner See; Elbe; ?? ha; near Schönfeld, Saxony-Anhalt and Kamern in the Landkreis Stendal
7. Lake Niegripp; Elbe; ?? ha; near Niegripp in the Landkreis Jerichower Land
8. Salziger See; Salza; Weida; trockengelegt, near Röblingen am See

=== Ponds and others ===
1. Gotthardteich; Geisel; 6.8 ha; near Merseburg
2. Grenzteich; schmale Wipper, Wipper, Saale, Elbe; 70 are; near Neudorf
3. Lausiger Teiche; Elbe; ?? ha; near Bad Schmiedeberg
4. Maliniusteich; Rödelbachgraben, Selke, Bode, Saale, Elbe; near Straßberg in the Harz
5. Mensingteich; Hagenbach; 1.1 ha; near Gernrode
6. Möllerteich, Graben vom Möllerteich, Büschengraben, Rödelbachgraben, Selke, Bode, Saale, Elbe; between Straßberg and Breitenstein in the Harz
7. Mühlenteich; Selke; 7.1 ha; near Güntersberge
8. Neudorfer Gemeindeteich; unnamed, tributary of the schmalen Wipper, schmale Wipper, Wipper, Saale, Elbe; 50 a; in Neudorf
9. Neudorfer kleiner Teich 1; unnamed, tributary of the schmalen Wipper, schmale Wipper, Wipper, Saale, Elbe; 3 a; near Neudorf
10. Neudorfer kleiner Teich 2; unnamed, tributary of the schmalen Wipper, schmale Wipper, Wipper, Saale, Elbe; 22 a; near Neudorf

== Canals and ditches ==
1. Elbe-Havel Canal
2. Gnevsdorfer Vorfluter
3. Mittelland Canal
4. Niegripper Link Canal
5. Pareyer Link Canal
6. Rothenseer Link Canal
7. Schindelbrücher Kunstgraben
8. Siebengründer Graben

== See also ==
- River basin
- Tributary
- Catchment area
- List of rivers in Germany
- List of lakes in Germany
