= Sülze =

Sülze is the German word for food in aspic.

Sülze may refer to:

- Head cheese or brawn, when set in aspic
- Sülze (Bergen), a part of Bergen on the Lüneburg Heath in Germany
- Sülze Saltworks, on the Lüneburg Heath in Germany which was worked from the High Middle Ages to 1862
- Bad Sülze, a town in the Vorpommern-Rügen district, in Mecklenburg-Western Pomerania, Germany
- Sülze (Elbe), a river of Saxony-Anhalt, Germany, tributary of the Elbe
- Sülze (Werra), a river of Thuringia, Germany, tributary of the Werra
- Kleine Sülze, a river of Saxony-Anhalt, Germany, tributary of the Schrote
- Große Sülze, a river of Saxony-Anhalt, Germany, tributary of the Schrote
