= Geisel =

Geisel may refer to:

- Ernesto Geisel (1907–1996), Brazilian military general and politician
- Orlando Geisel (1905–1979), Brazilian general and Minister of the Army, Ernesto's brother
- Dr. Seuss, pen name of Theodor Seuss Geisel (1904–1991), a children's book author
- Theo Geisel (physicist) (born 1948), German physicist
- Geisel (river), Saxony-Anhalt, Germany
- Geisel valley, the valley of the river Geisel
- Geisel Library, the main library building at the University of California San Diego, named after Dr. Seuss

== See also ==
- Geisei, Kōchi, a village in Japan
