= Brumbach =

Brumbach or Brumback may refer to:

- Brumbach (Wipper), a river of Saxony-Anhalt, Germany, tributary of the Wipper

== People with that surname ==
- Babette Brumback, American biostatistician
- Charles T. Brumback, American newspaper publisher, president of the Orlando Sentinel in the late 1970s
- Clarence L. Brumback (died 2012), American public health director, 1989 winner of Sedgwick Memorial Medal
- Lieutenant Colonel Jefferson Brumback, commander of the 95th Ohio Infantry in the American Civil War
- John Sanford Brumback (1829–1897), American businessman, namesake of Brumback Library in Ohio
- Katie Sandwina, (1884–1952) (birth name Brumbach), a circus strongwoman
- Lexi Brumback (born 2000), American cheerleader and television personality
- Louise Upton Brumback (1867–1929), American artist and art activist known for her landscapes and marine scenes, her surname from time to time misspelled as Brumbach
- Helga and Sylvia Brumbach, target girls
- Roger Alan Brumback (1948–2013), American neurologist, namesake of Brumback's night monkey

== See also ==
- Brumbaugh
