= Uchte (disambiguation) =

Uchte is a municipality in Lower Saxony, Germany.

Uchte may also refer to:

- Uchte (Samtgemeinde), a Samtgemeinde ("collective municipality") in Lower Saxony, Germany, its seat is the municipality Uchte
- Uchte (Biese), a river of Saxony-Anhalt, tributary of the Biese
