= Eulegraben =

River in Germany

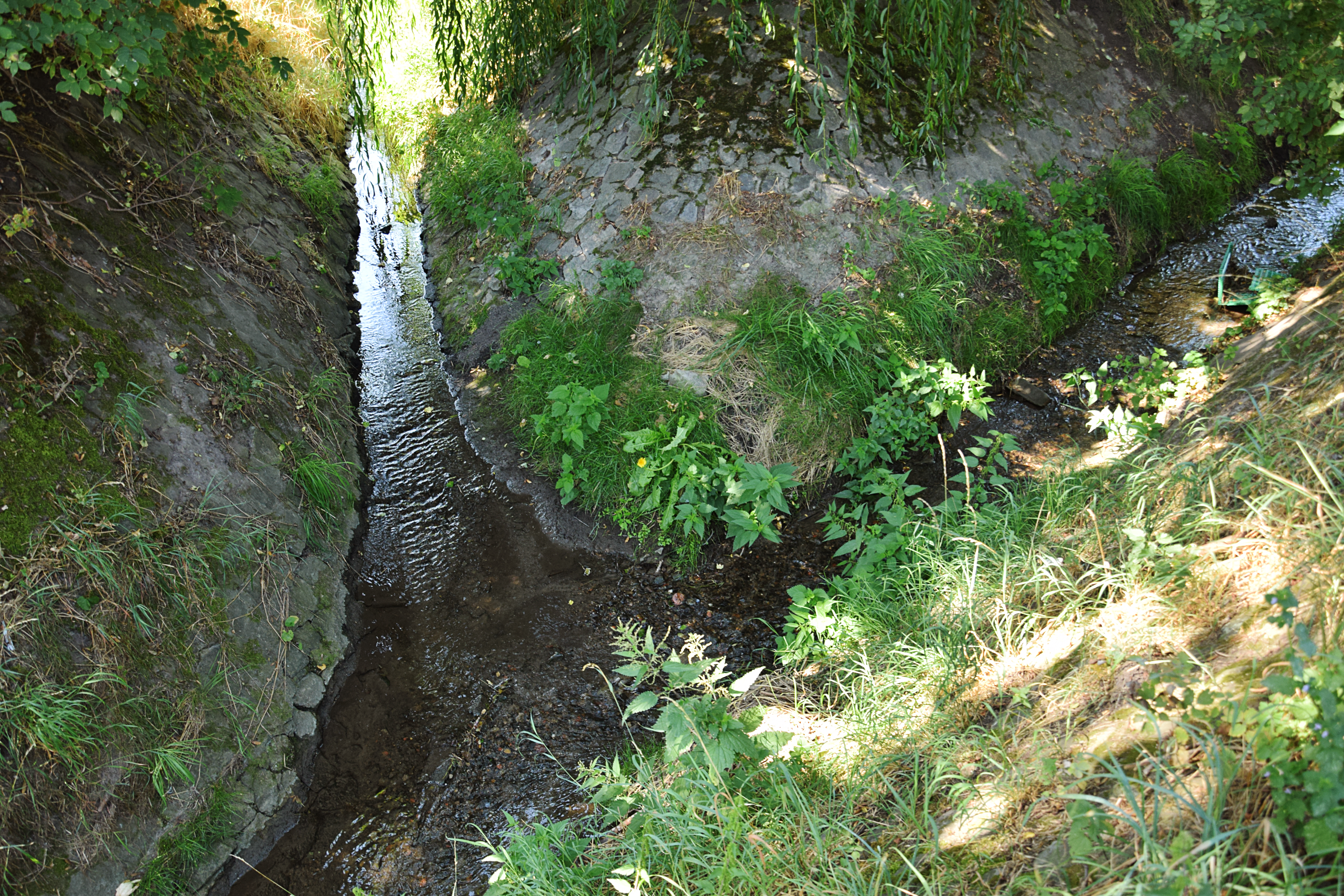

Location
- Country: Germany
- State: Saxony-Anhalt

Physical characteristics
- Mouth
  - location: Klinke
  - coordinates: 52.0962°N 11.5996°E

Basin features
- Progression: Klinke→ Elbe→ North Sea

Eulegraben is a small river of Saxony-Anhalt, Germany. It flows into the Klinke in Magdeburg.

== See also ==
- List of rivers of Saxony-Anhalt
