= Frankleben hoard =

Coordinates: 51.30°N 11.93°E

The Frankleben hoard is a significant hoard deposit of the European Bronze Age, associated with the Unstrut group (itself associated with the Tumulus or early Urnfield culture (ca. 1500–1250 BC)). The site is in the Geisel valley, formed by a minor tributary of the Saale River. It was discovered in 1946 in a brown coal pit near Frankleben, now a part of Braunsbedra municipality, Saxony-Anhalt, Germany.

The hoard consists of three ceramic vessels, buried alongside one another. One of the vessels was destroyed by a coal dredger at the time of discovery. The finds consist of a total of about 45 kg of bronze artefacts, most of them sickles, alongside some axeheads.

The discovery was made by the operator of the coal dredger, Anton Wesp, in the "Michael Vesta" pit (now flooded and part of Runstedter See south of Frankleben, just off the BAB 38 highway). Wesp's dredger destroyed the first vessel almost completely in June 1946 (find I). Wesp returned to the site on 5 July 1946 and discovered a second vessel (find II), from which he was able to save 93 sickles and two axeheads. Wesp examined the site and found a third vessel (find III), containing 130 sickles and 12 axeheads. Find III is thus the best preserved, and its original arrangement was recorded. The sickles were deposited in a helix or fan-like arrangement, and the axeheads were laid on top of the sickles.

The original hoard probably contained more than 300 such bronze sickles of the so-called Knopfsichel ("knob-sickle") type, of which 237 came into the possession of the Halle State Museum of Prehistory. Wilhelm Albert von Brunn published an analysis of the hoard in 1958. Von Brunn distinguished 91 types of sickles, originating from 182 individual moulds. Some 179 out of the total of 237 sickles show traces of use. On the sickle blades are patterns. Von Brunn interpreted them as marks or pictograms identifying the sickle-maker. By contrast, Sommerfeld (1994) suggested that the patterns represent numeral signs. Sommerfeld further suggested that beyond their obvious usefulness as a tool (as indicated by the traces of use), bronze sickles during the Urnfield period had acquired a secondary function as commodity money.

Knob-sickles of the Frankleben type were found in four other hoards in the middle Saale region. The tradition of depositing bronze artefacts in the hoards in this region predates the Urnfield culture, reaching back to the beginning of the 2nd millennium BC. These early hoards consisted of axes, while the Urnfield period hoards were dominated by sickles, even though a smaller number of axes were still included alongside the sickles. In the later Bronze Age, the tradition of hoards continued, but the sickles were in turn replaced by jewelry such as arm rings.

== Numerals ==
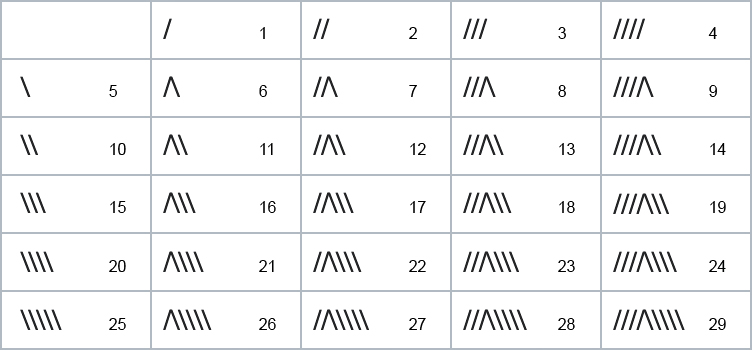
The cast mark numeral system

An analysis of the Frankleben hoard found that markings on the sickles constituted a numeral system related to the lunar calendar. According to the Halle State Museum of Prehistory:

“Many sickles carry line-shaped markings. The scope and order of these brands follow a defined pattern. This sign language can be interpreted as a pre-form of a writing system. There are two types of symbols: line-shaped marks below the button and marks at the angle or the base of the sickle body. The archaeologist Christoph Sommerfeld examined the rules and realized that the casting marks are composed of one to nine ribs. After four left-hand, individually counted strokes there follows a bundle as a group of five on the right side. This creates a counting system that reaches 29. The Synodic Moon orbit lasts 29 days or nights. This number and the lunar shape of the sickle suggest that the stroke groups should be interpreted as calendar pages, as a point in the monthly cycle. The sickle marks are the oldest known sign system in Central Europe.”

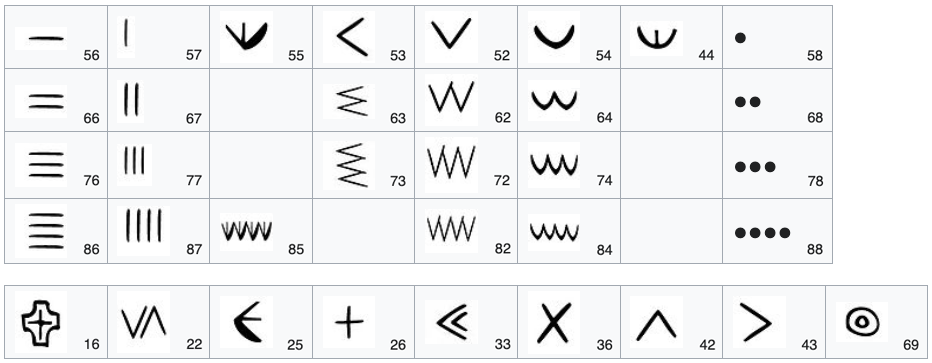
Some other symbols or marks found on the sickles

The sickles also feature other marks or symbols which the archaeologist Christoph Sommmerfeld (1994) suggests may represent 'conceptual signs', or a type of proto-writing. Markings on sickles and tools from across Bronze Age Europe have been interpreted by other authors as ownership marks, sign systems, number systems or "units of information" of unknown meaning.

The archaeologist Mikkel Hansen (2019) has suggested that the Frankleben sickle-numeral system may be related to 'hand signs' found among petroglyphs from the Nordic Bronze Age, which may have a similar numerical and calendrical meaning.

== Literature ==
- Wilhelm Albert von Brunn, Der Schatz von Frankleben und die mitteldeutschen Sichelfunde, Prähistorische Zeitschrift 26 (1958), 1-70.
- Christoph Sommerfeld: Gerätegeld Sichel. Studien zur monetären Struktur bronzezeitlicher Horte im nördlichen Mitteleuropa (Vorgeschichtliche Forschungen Bd. 19), Berlin/New York 1994 ISBN 3-11-012928-0
- Bettina Stoll-Tucker: Mondsicheln in der Erde. In: Landesamt für Archäologie Sachsen-Anhalt, Landesmuseum für Vorgeschichte (Hrsg.): Schönheit, Macht und Tod. 120 Funde aus 120 Jahren Landesmuseum für Vorgeschichte Halle. Begleitband zur Sonderausstellung vom 11. Dezember 2001 bis 28. April 2002 im Landesmuseum für Vorgeschichte Halle/Saale.
- Marco Chiriaco, Der Hortfund von Frankleben: Ein Sichelmassenhort im chronologischen und geographischen Kontext sowie seine Bedeutung (2009), ISBN 9783640271153
