= Wippra Dam =

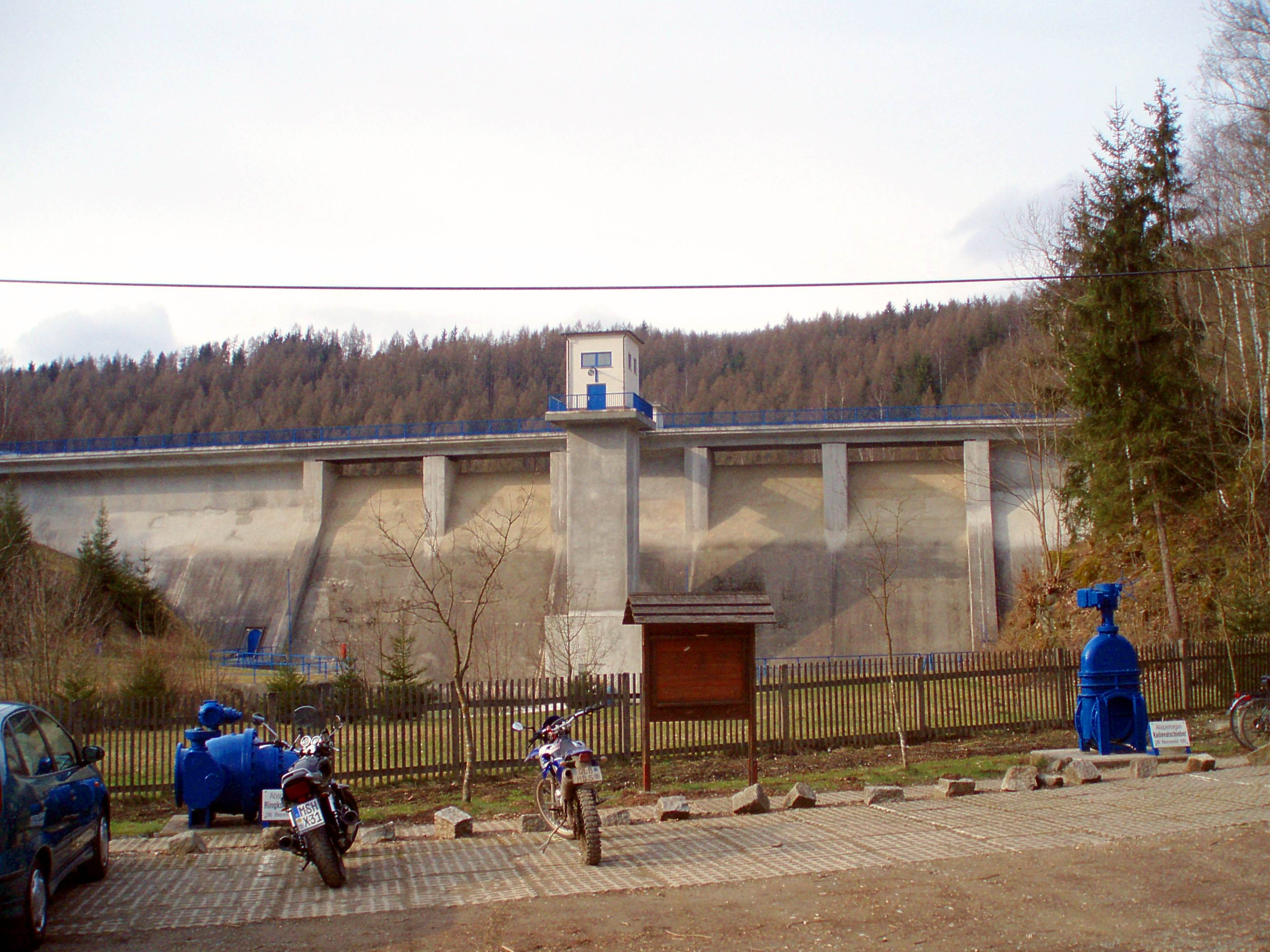
- The dam in March 2008

- Location within Germany
- Country: Germany
- Location: Mansfeld-Südharz, Saxony-Anhalt
- Coordinates: 51°34′0″N 11°12′22″E
- Construction began: February 1951
- Opening date: November 1952
- Operator: Talsperrenbetrieb Saxony-Anhalt

Dam and spillways
- Type of dam: Gravity dam
- Impounds: Wipper
- Height: 24.9 m (82 ft)
- Length: 126 m (413 ft)
- Dam volume: 19,000 m^{3} (670,000 ft^{3})
- Spillway capacity: 2,000,000 m^{3} (71,000,000 ft^{3})

Power Station
- Type: Conventional
- Installed capacity: 22 KW

The Wippra Dam or Wipper Dam (German: Talsperre-Wippra or Wippertalsperre, partly also Vorsperre Wippra or Vorsperre Wipper) is a dam on the river Wipper in the Harz mountains. It lies near Wippra, not far from Mansfeld and Hettstedt in Saxony-Anhalt. It was built between February 1951 and November 1952.

It was built in order to ensure the supply of industrial water to the copper-processing plants in Mansfeld and Hettstedt. Its role in flood protection is rather limited because it was originally only built as an auxiliary dam. Plans for a bigger main dam further down the valley never came to fruition. The Wipper Dam also generates electricity using hydropower. The rated capacity of the power station is 22 kW.

Its operator is Talsperrenbetrieb Saxony-Anhalt.

The barrier itself is a gravity dam made of concrete. Guided tours of the inside of the dam are available.

On the dam is checkpoint no. 219 in the Harzer Wandernadel hiking system.

== Impressions of Wippra Reservoir ==
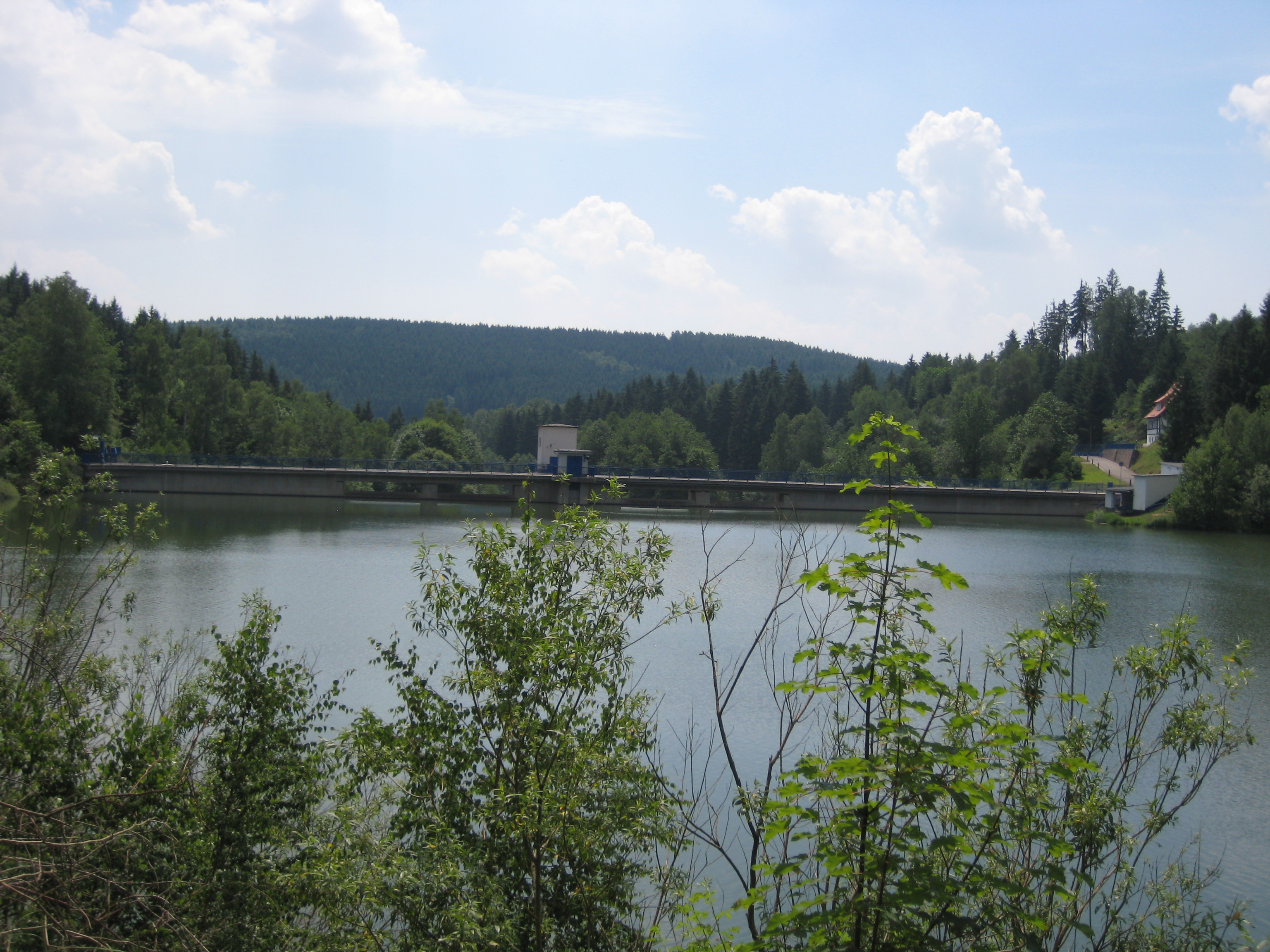

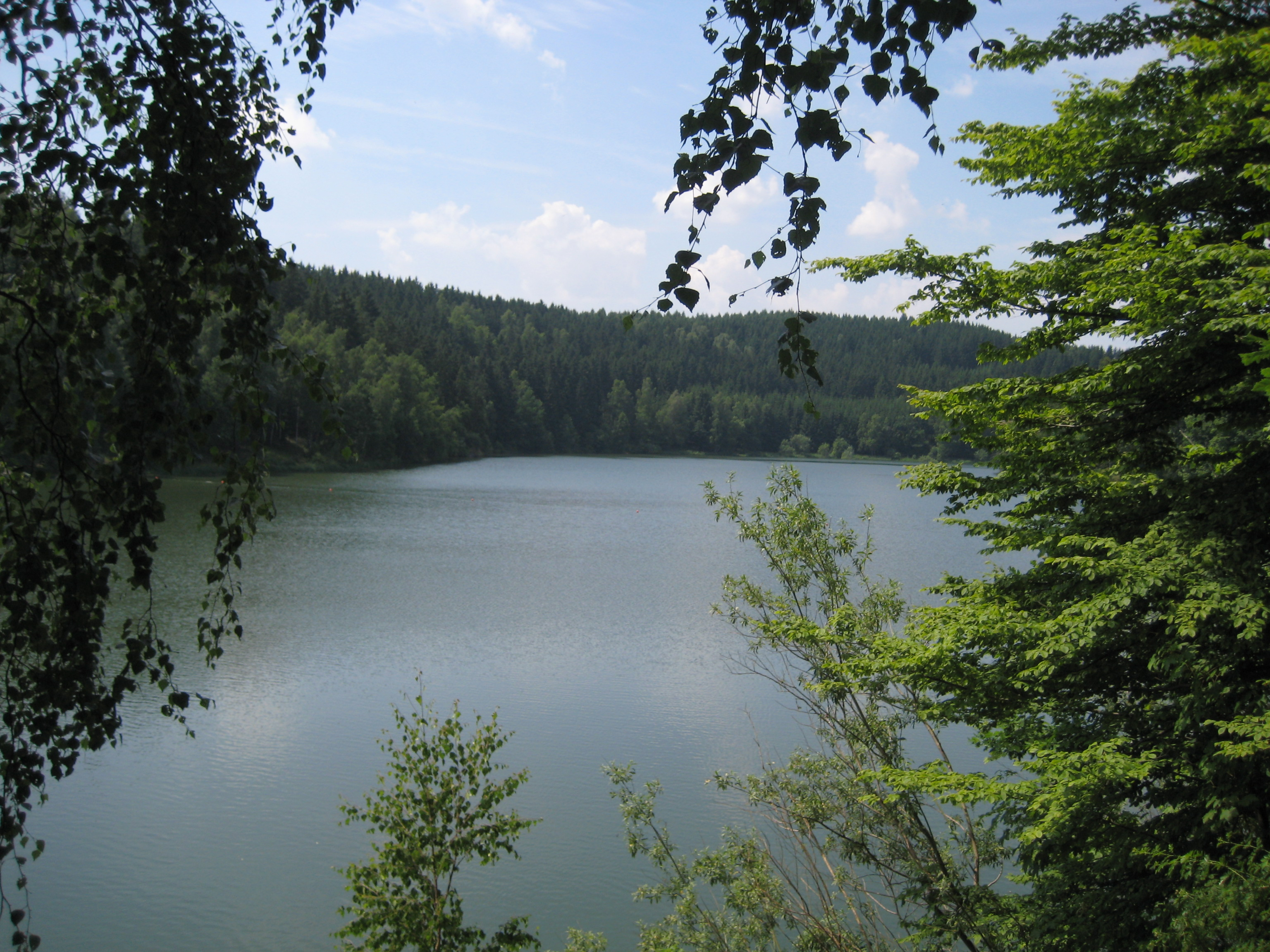

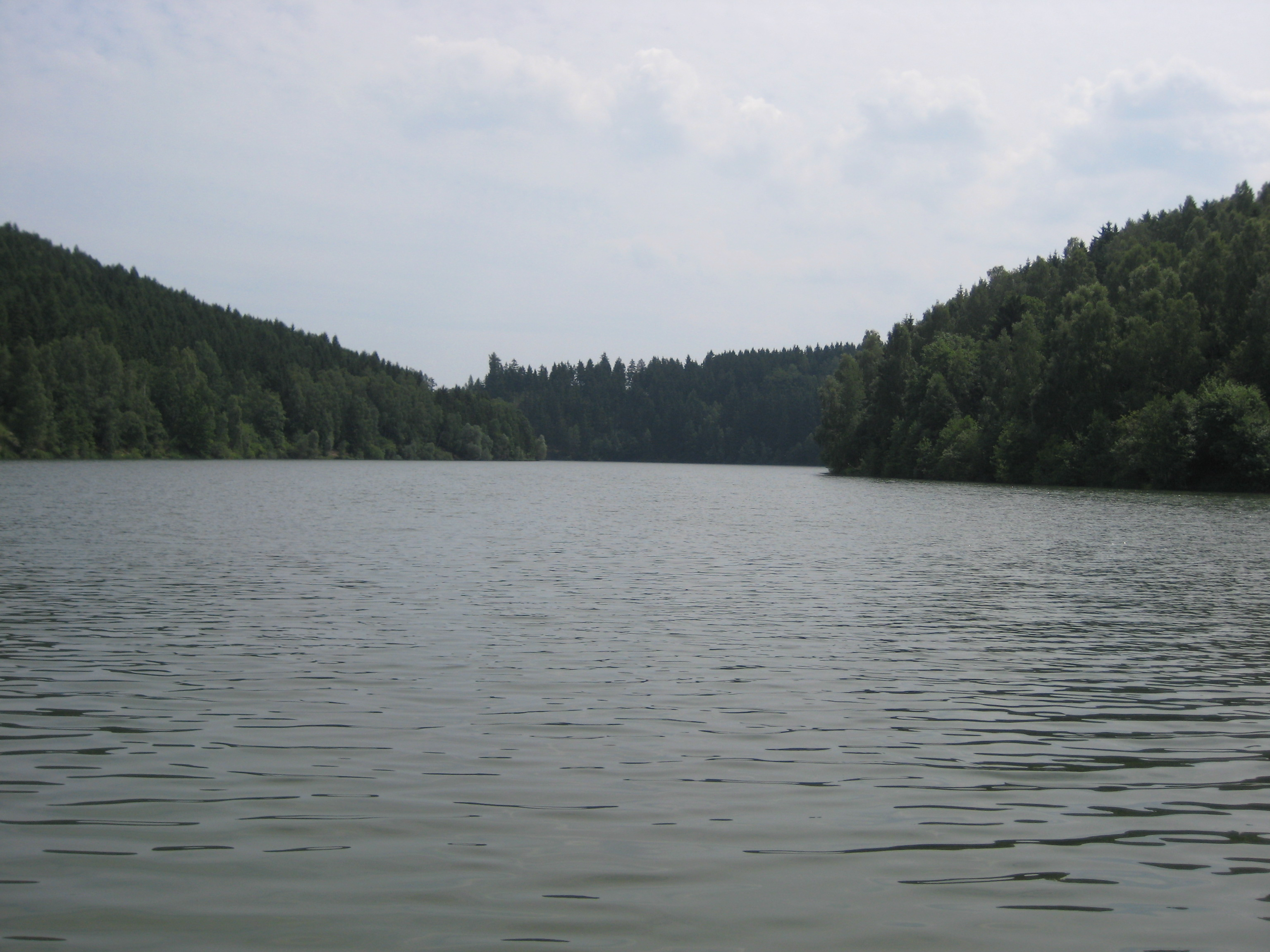

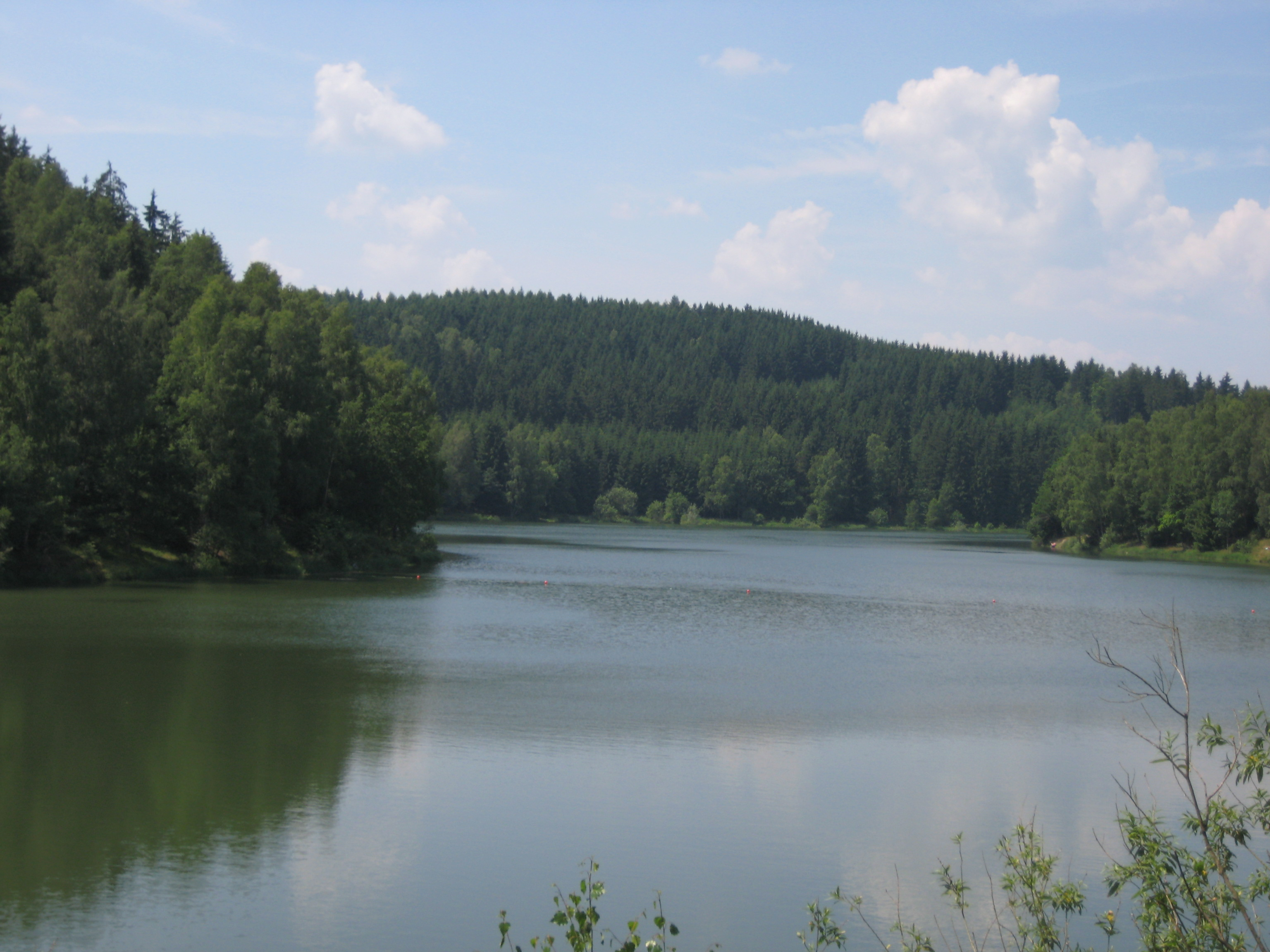

== See also ==
- List of dams and reservoirs in Germany
- List of dams in the Harz
