= Elster-Saale Canal =

German canal project

Coordinates: 51°21′21″N 12°13′55″E

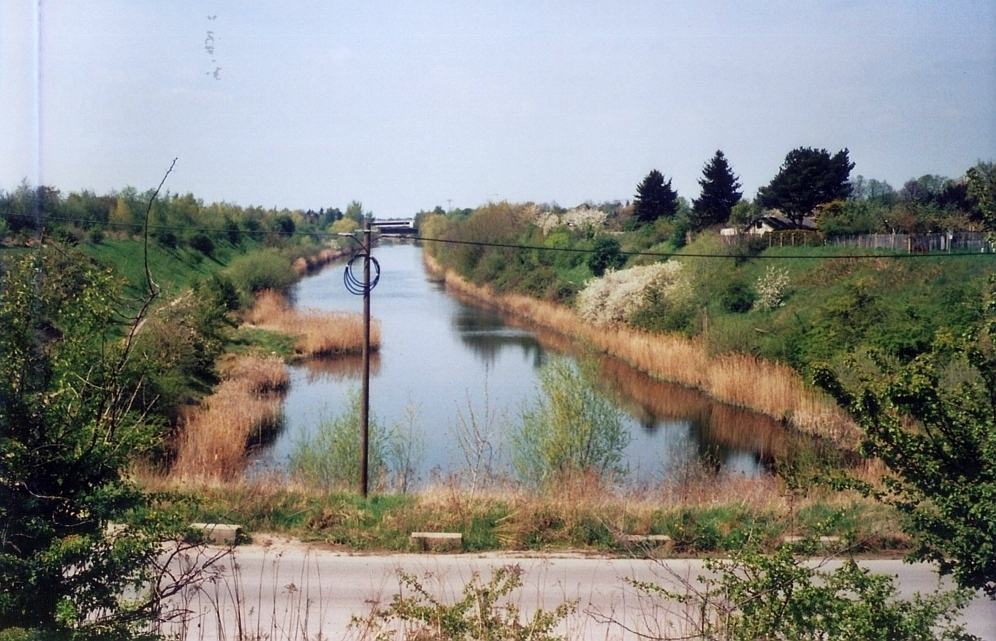
Start of the Elster-Saale Canal at Lindenau Harbour

The Elster-Saale Canal (German: Elster-Saale-Kanal), renamed in 1999 by the Federal Waterways and Shipping Administration to Saale-Leipzig Canal (German: Saale-Leipzig-Kanal) or SLK and on the Halle side also called Saale-Elster Canal, was a canal project started in 1933 and aborted in 1943. It was intended to link the White Elster river with the Saale near Leuna and thus enable the city of Leipzig to be joined to Germany's inland waterway network. The 11 kilometre long water-filled channel is one of the "special federal waterways".

A lock was built near Wusteneutzch which would have allowed canal freight traffic to connect with the Saale; however the canal never reached this point. This link would have given Leipzig access to the Elbe via the Saale and thus to Hamburg and the North Sea. The canal was planned for ships up to 1,000 tonnes in weight (roughly Class IV).

Plans to complete the canal have been revived and an Elster-Saale Canal Society has been formed.

== Gallery ==
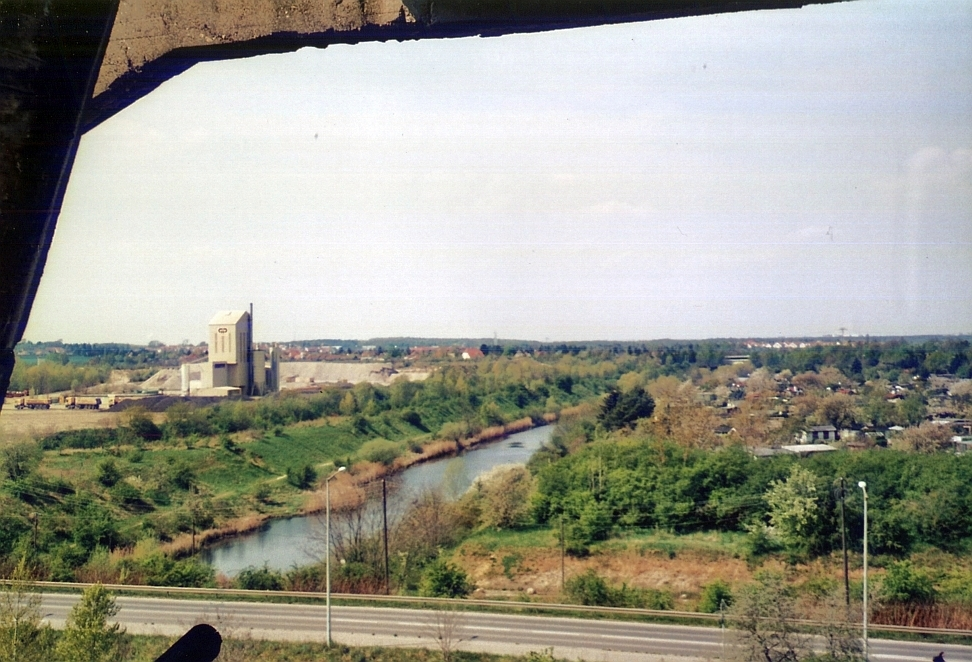
Start of the canal in Leipzig

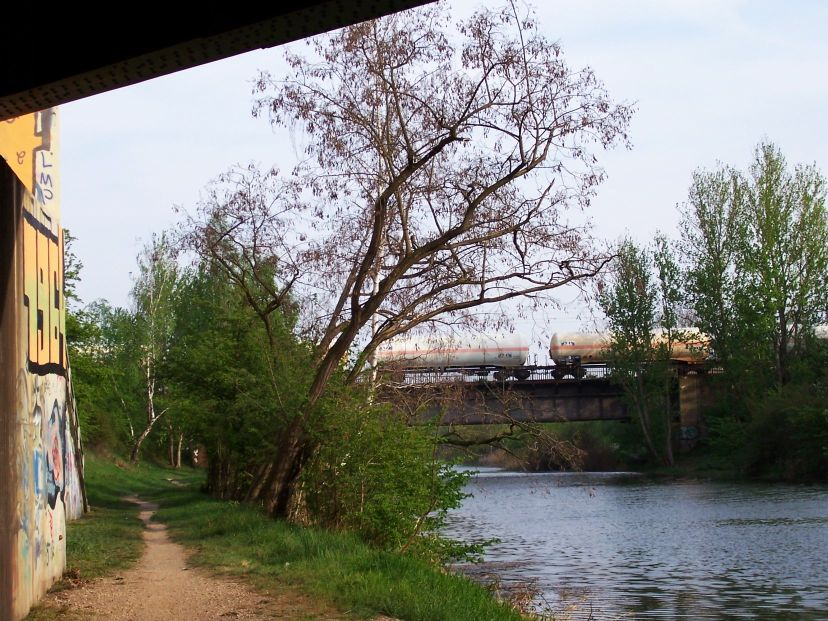
Railway bridge near Rückmarsdorf

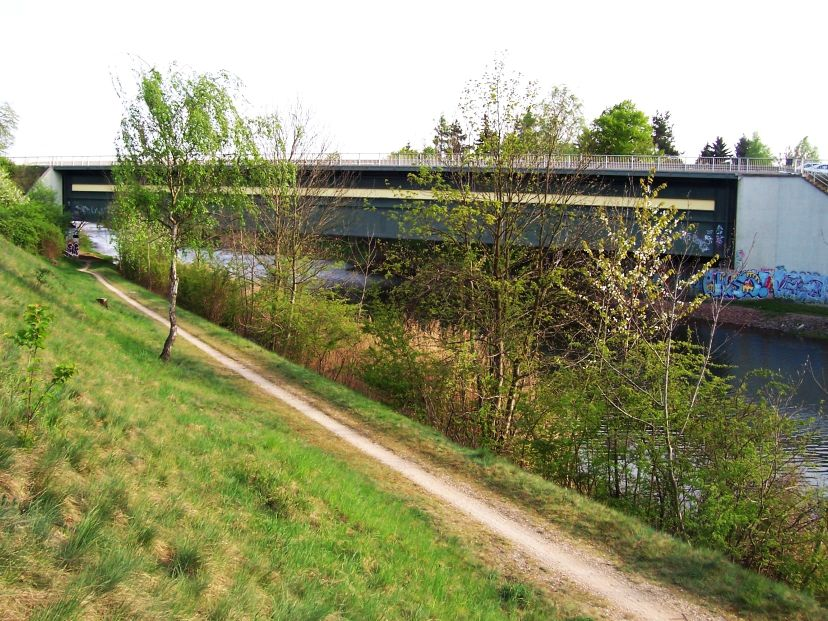
B 181 bridge near Rückmarsdorf

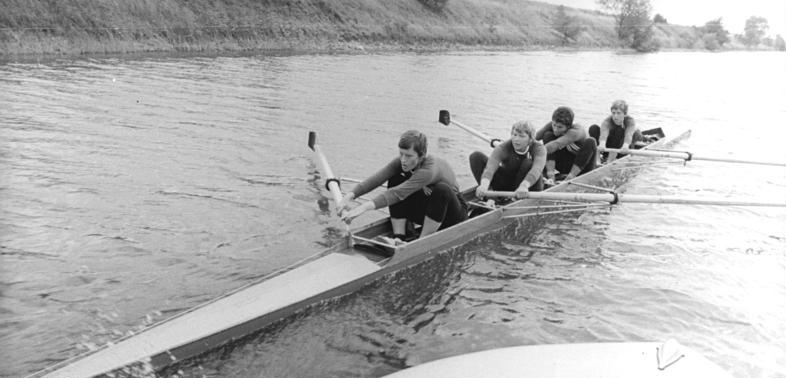
Even in GDR times the canal was used for rowing

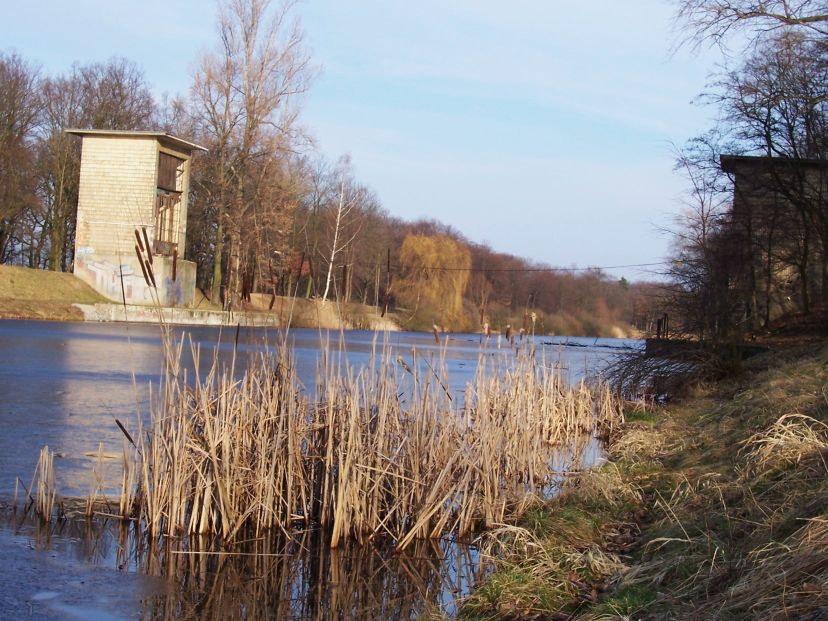
Safety gate East near Burghausen

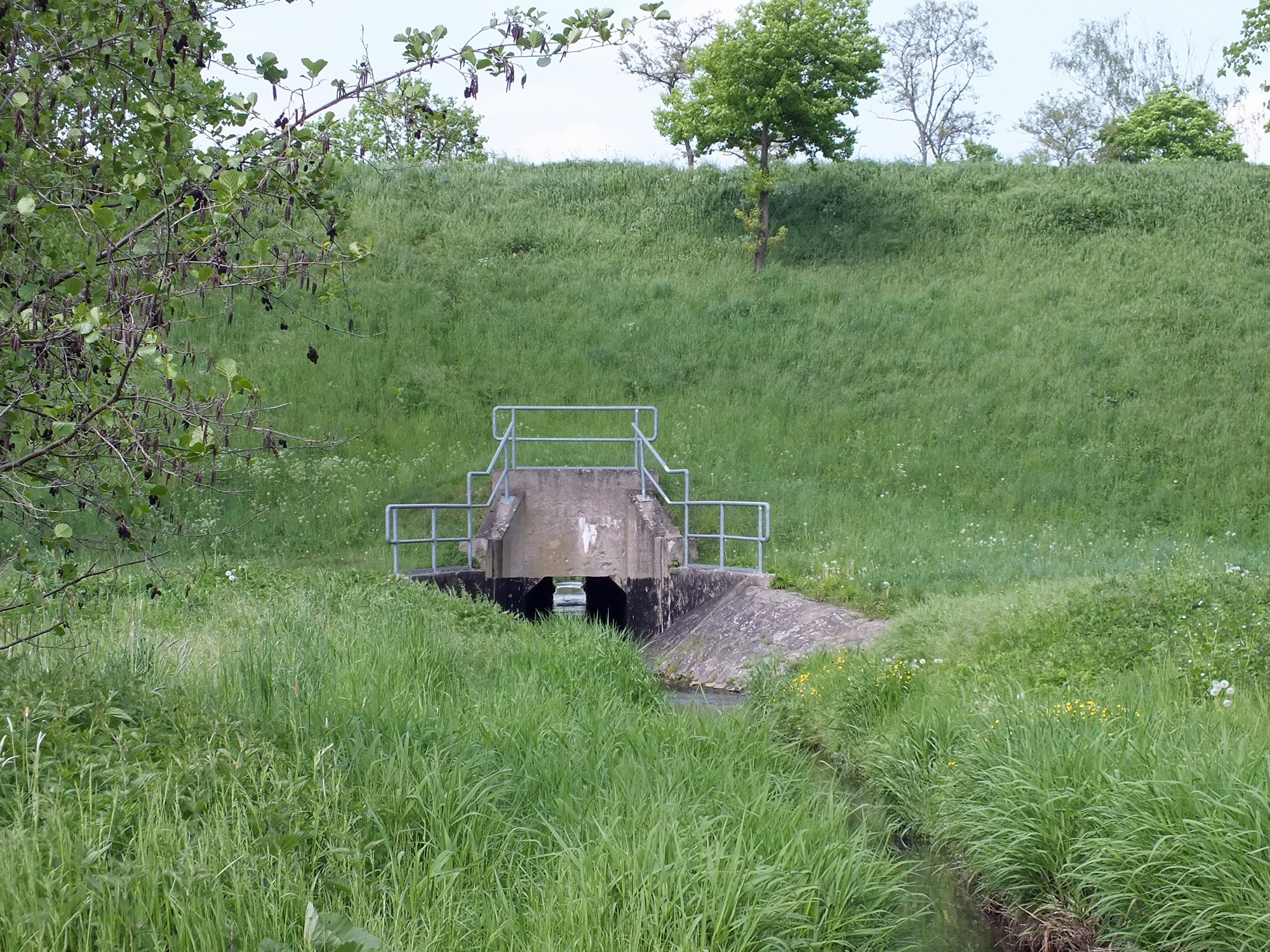
Underpass for the Zschampert below the Elster-Saale Canal

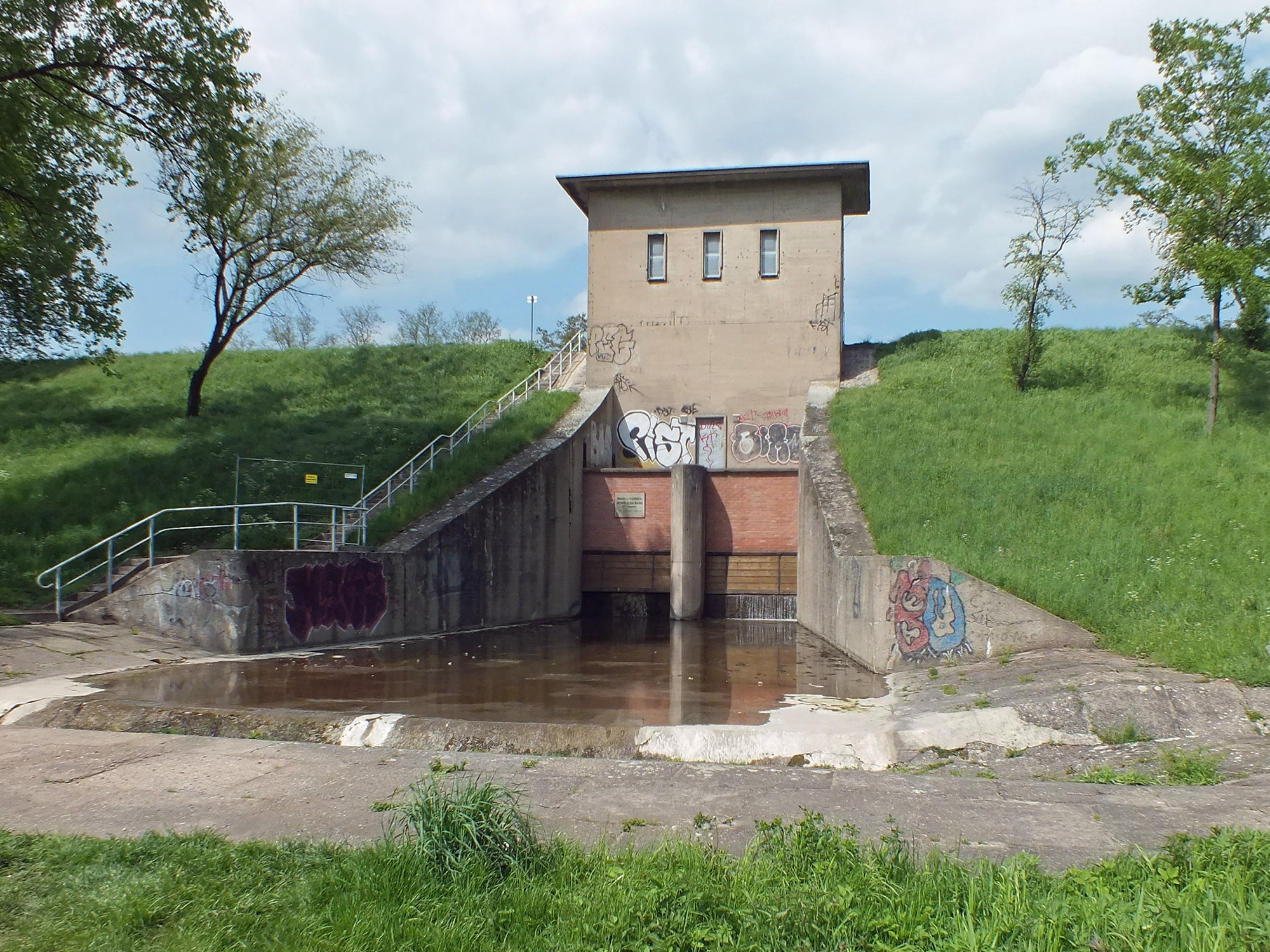
Relief work for water level regulation

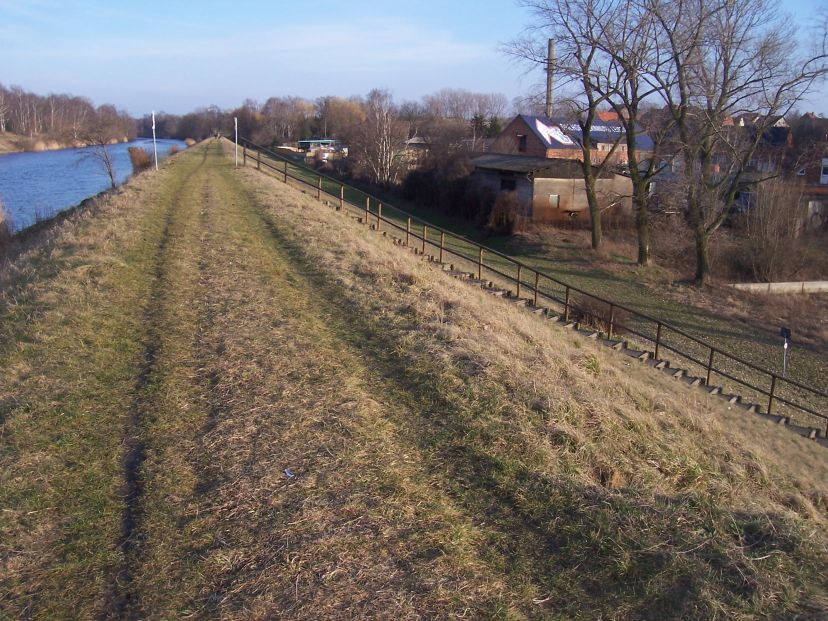
The canal near Dölzig

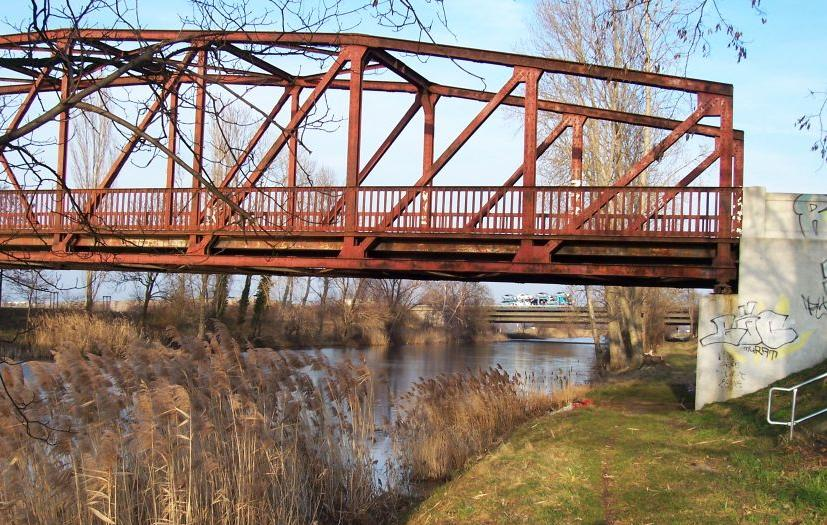
Bridge near Günthersdorf. Background: the A 9 motorway bridge

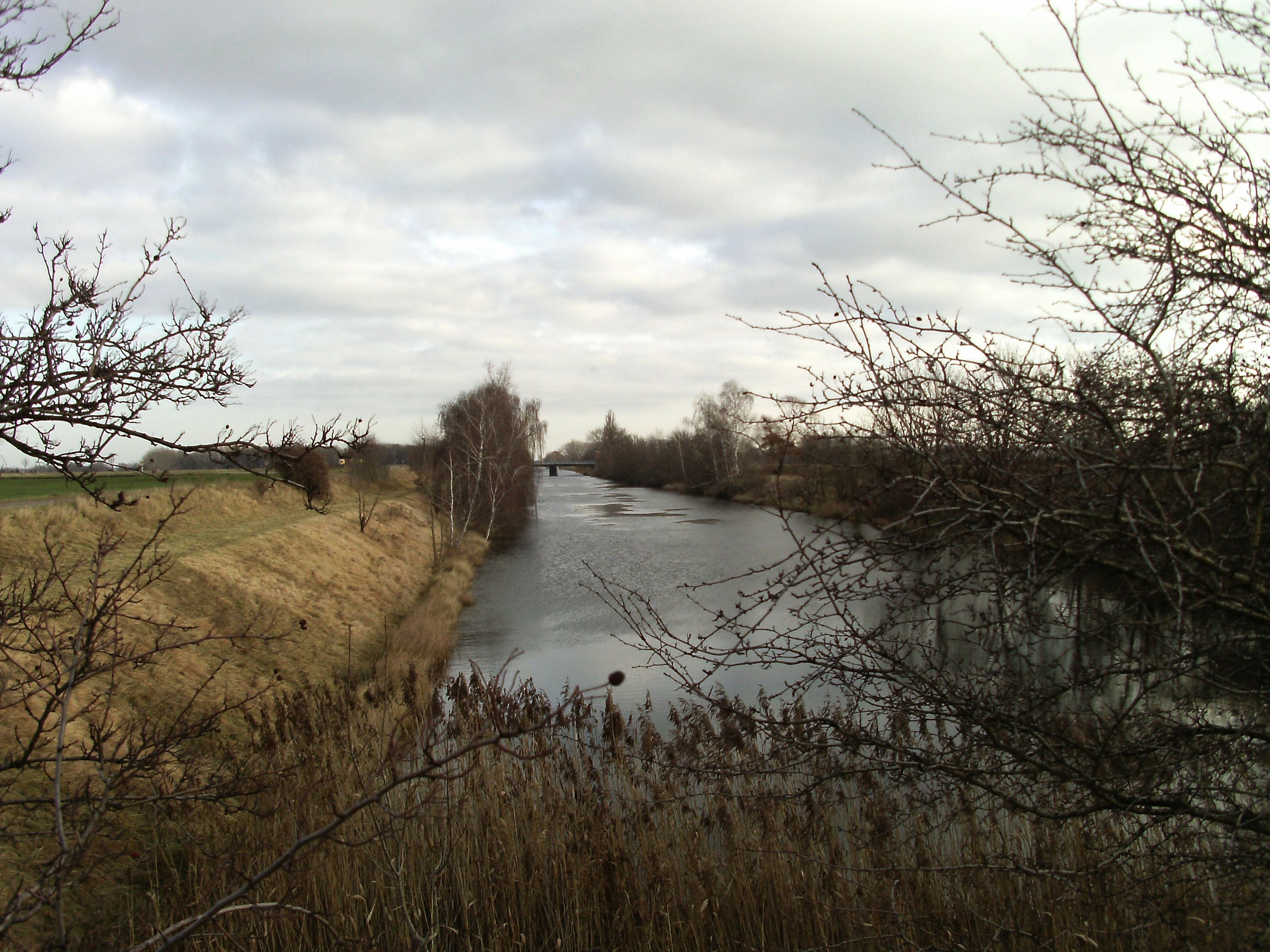
End of the canal near Günthersdorf

== See also ==
- List of waterbodies in Saxony-Anhalt
- Bodies of water in Leipzig
- Karl Heine Canal

== Literature ==
- Wolfram Sturm, Leipzig und seine Schiffskanäle. Leipzig, 1998.
- Dirk Becker (2009), Der Südflügel des Mittellandkanals: Per Schiff von Magdeburg über Merseburg nach Leipzig (in German) (1. ed.), Halle: Projekte-Verlag, ISBN 978-3866346093
- Denis Achtner (2008), "Der Elster-Saale-Kanal" (pdf excerpt), Böhlitzer Hefte (in German), vol. Band 2 (2. ed.), Leipzig: Creativ Werbeagentur Kolb
