= Kleine Sülze =

River in Germany

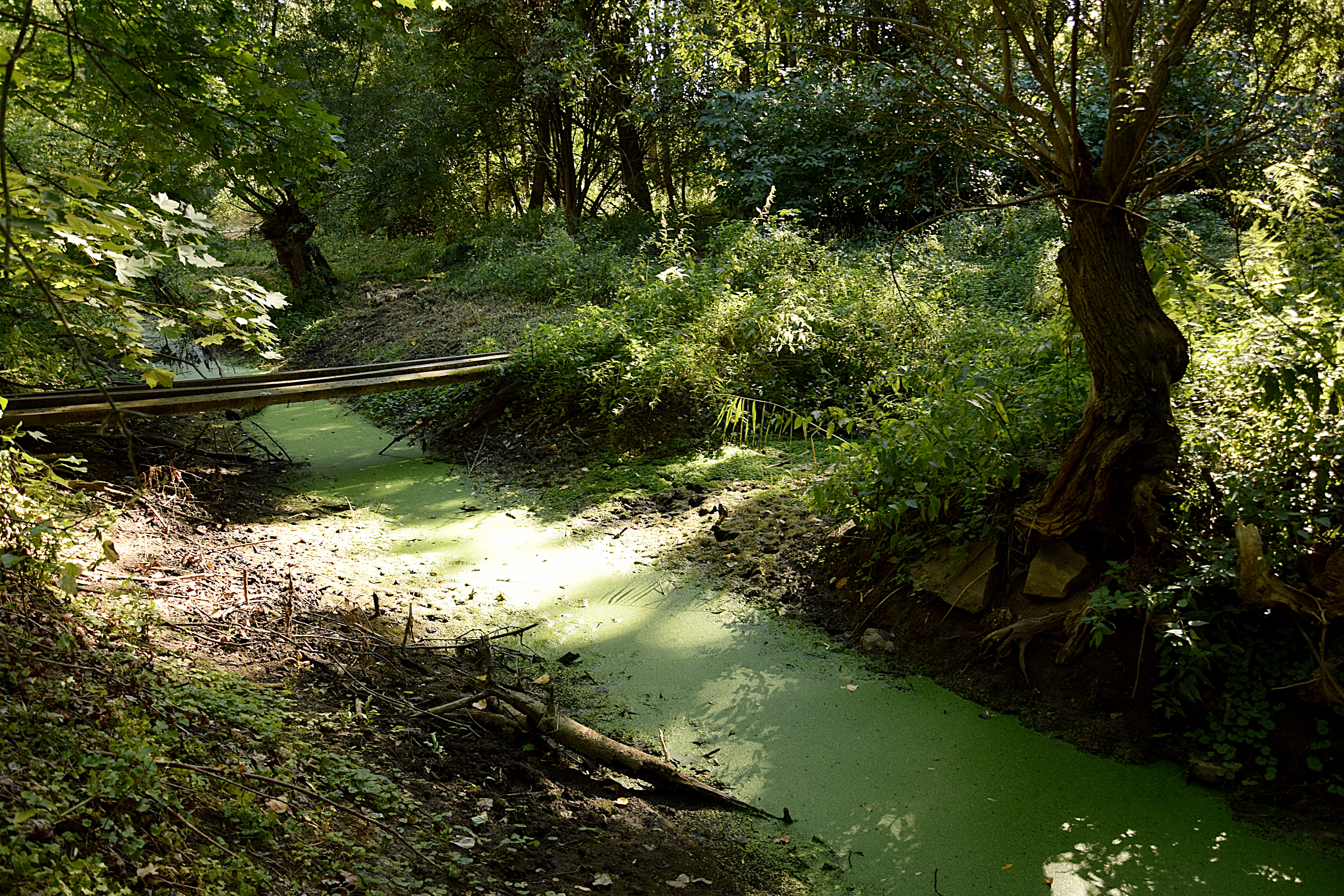

Location
- Country: Germany
- States: Saxony-Anhalt

Physical characteristics
- Mouth
  - location: Schrote
  - coordinates: 52.2172°N 11.6415°E

Basin features
- Progression: Schrote→ Ohre→ Elbe→ North Sea

Kleine Sülze is a river of Saxony-Anhalt, Germany. It flows into the Schrote near Barleben.

== See also ==
- List of rivers of Saxony-Anhalt
