= Uchte (Biese) =

River in Germany

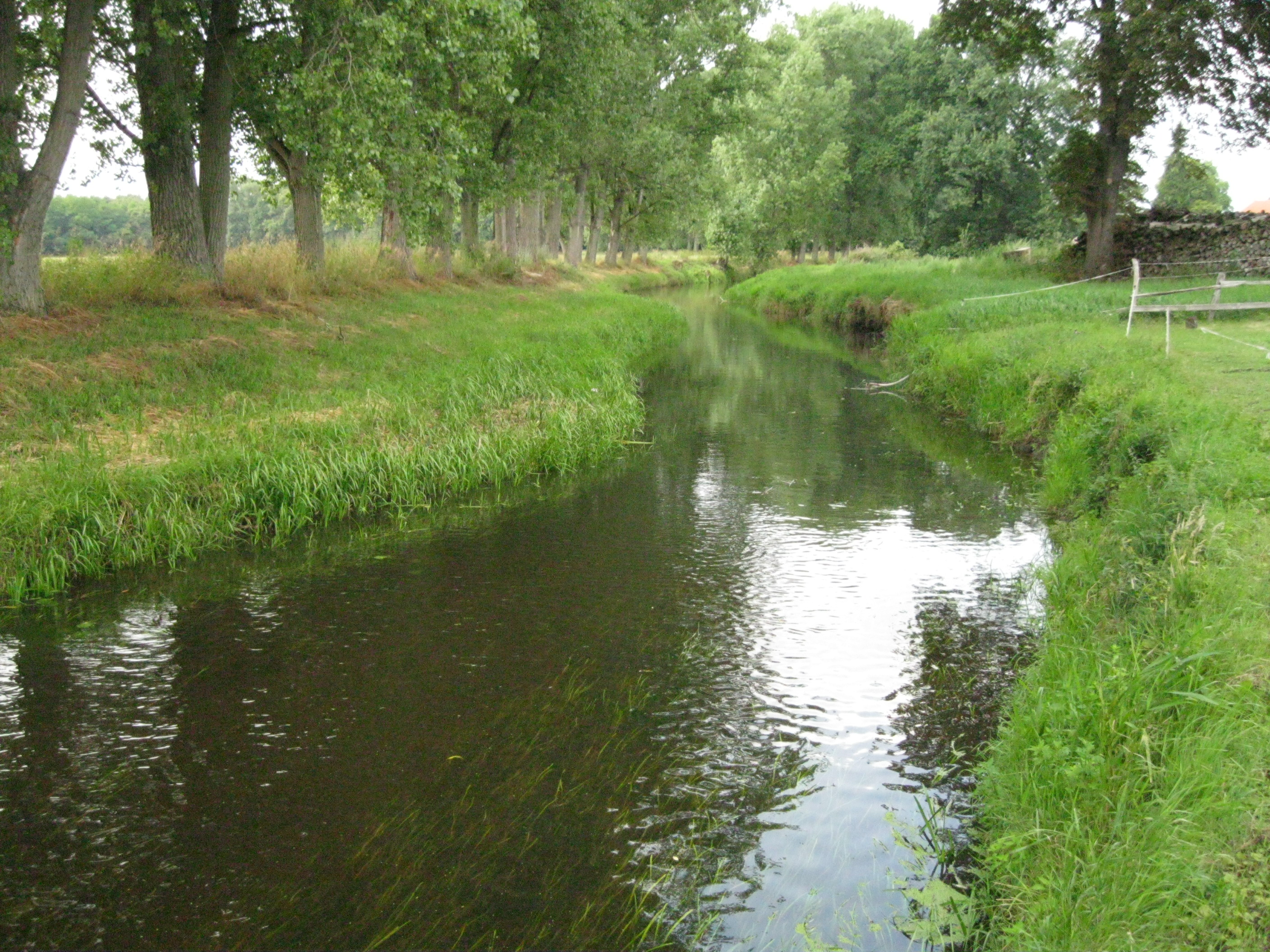

Location
- Country: Germany
- State: Saxony-Anhalt

Physical characteristics
- Mouth
  - location: Biese
  - coordinates: 52.7967°N 11.7632°E
- Length: 34.8 km (21.6 mi)

Basin features
- Progression: Biese→ Aland→ Elbe→ North Sea

Uchte is a river of Saxony-Anhalt, Germany. It flows into the Biese in Osterburg.

== See also ==
- List of rivers of Saxony-Anhalt
