= Kunstteich Neudorf =

Water reservoir in Germany

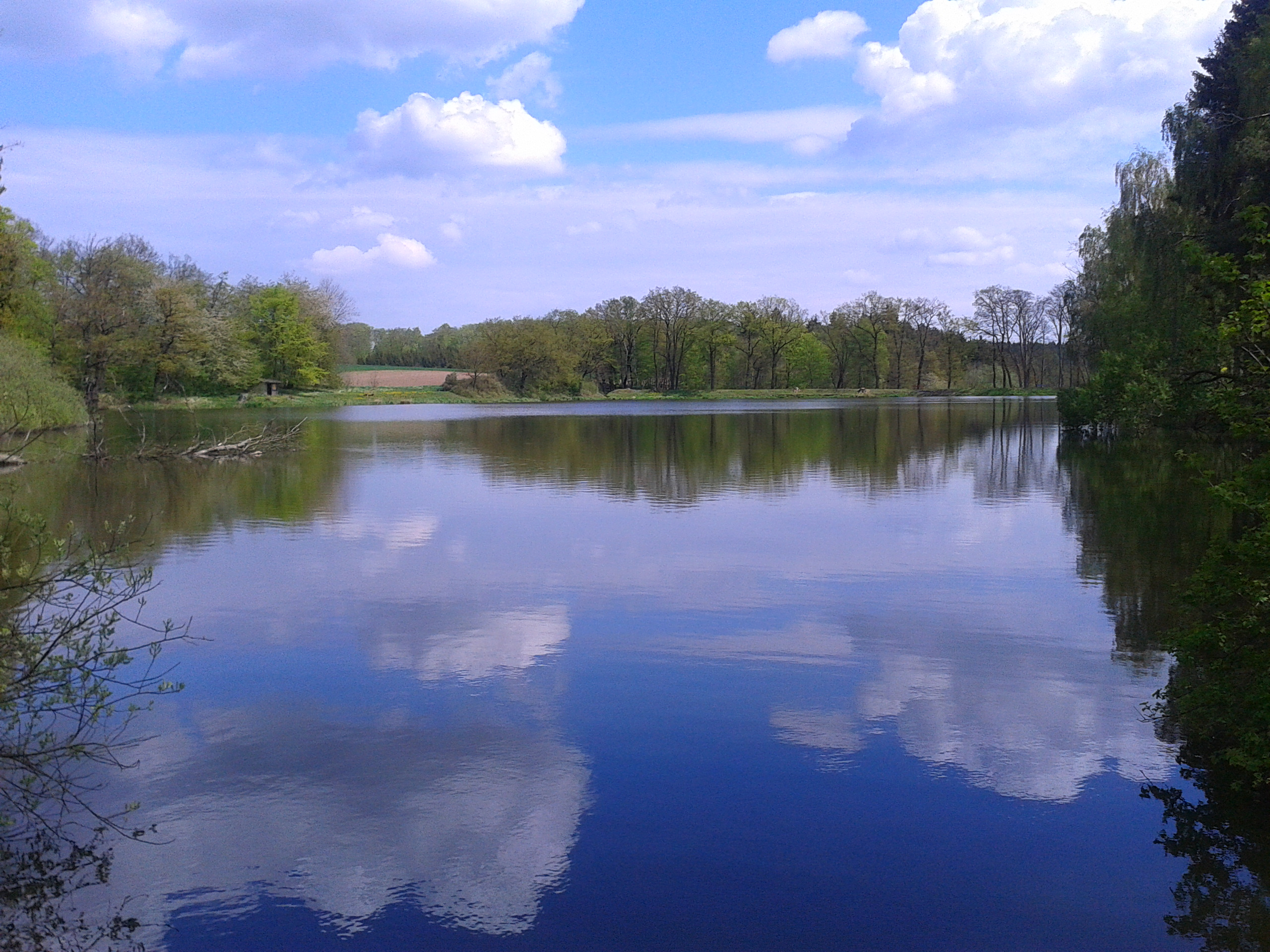

- Location within Germany
- Location: Harz Mountains, Saxony-Anhalt, Germany
- Coordinates: 51°36′24″N 11°07′36″E
- River sources: Schmale Wipper

Kunstteich Neudorf is a reservoir near Neudorf in the Harz Mountains, Saxony-Anhalt, Germany. It is fed and drained by a small tributary of the Schmale Wipper, itself a tributary of the Wipper.
