= Wipper (Saale) =

River in Germany

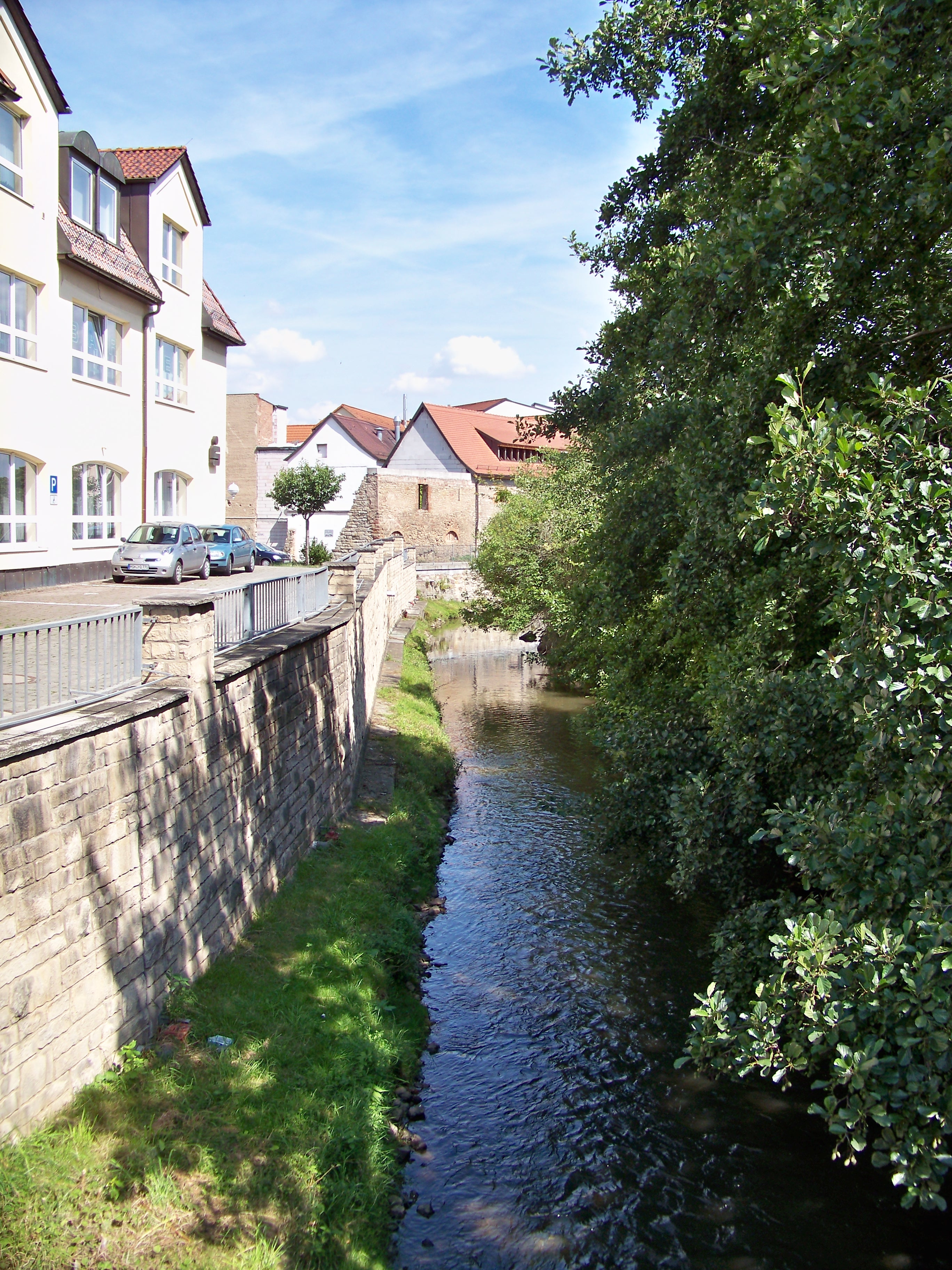
- The Wipper at Hettstedt

Location
- Country: Germany
- State: Saxony-Anhalt

Physical characteristics
- Source
  - location: Harz
- Mouth
  - location: Saale
  - coordinates: 51°47′14″N 11°43′6″E
- Length: 85 km (53 mi)

Basin features
- Progression: Saale→ Elbe→ North Sea

The Wipper (German pronunciation: [ˈvɪpɐ]) is a river in Saxony-Anhalt, Germany. A left tributary of the Saale, the Wipper is 85 kilometres (53 mi) long. Its name comes from the old German word Uipparaha, which means "singing, bouncing river".

== Course ==
The Wipper originates in the southeastern Harz, near Harzgerode at the bottom of Auerberg mountain. The Wipper joins the Saale in Bernburg.

=== Tributaries ===
The following rivers are tributaries of the Wipper:

- Schmale Else (L)
- Wolfsberger Wipper (R) near Dankerode
- Wippra Dam near Wippra
- Horla (R) near Wippra
- Schmale Wipper (L) near Wippra
- Hasselbach (R) near Wippra
- Brumbach (R) near Friesdorf
- Sengelbach (R) in Biesenrode
- Dorfbach (L) in Biesenrode
- Vatteröder Teich near Vatterode
- Ochsenpfuhlbach (R) near Vatterode
- Hagenbach (R) near Mansfeld
- Talbach (R) near Leimbach
- Fuchsbach (R) near Großörner
- Stockbach (L) near Großörner
- Alte Wipper, also known as Regenbeck (R) near Burgörner
- Hadeborn (L) in Hettstedt
- Walbke, also known as Ölgrundbach (L) near Wiederstedt
- Rote Welle (L) near Salzkoth/ Aschersleben
- Eine (L) near Aschersleben
- Mühlgraben (L) near Groß Schierstedt

=== Towns ===
The following towns and cities lie along the Wipper:

- Wippra, pop. 1552
- Friesdorf
- Rammelburg
- Biesenrode
- Vatterode
- Leimbach
- Großörner
- Hettstedt, pop. 15,629
- Wiederstedt, pop. 1074
- Sandersleben, pop. 1988
- Freckleben, part of the municipality of Aschersleben
- Drohndorf, part of the municipality of Aschersleben
- Mehringen
- Aschersleben, pop. 29,357
- Klein Schierstedt
- Groß Schierstedt, pop. 630
- Giersleben, pop. 1064
- Warmsdorf, pop. 812
- Güsten, pop. 4605
- Osmarsleben
- Ilberstedt, pop. 1155
- Bernburg, pop. 35,897

=== Mills ===
- Wippermühle in Wippra (today known as Mühlencafe)
- Kratzmühle between Friesdorf and Rammelburg, called after the first owner Nickel Kratz
- Herrenmühle between Friesdorf and Rammelburg, (currently a garage) it used to be a hostel for kids
- Klippmühle between Biesenrode and Vatterode: In 1848 August Schumann bought a flour and saw mill, which was taken over by Reinhold Schumann in 1893. When the railroad line Wipperliese was built, he opened a pub.

== Flooding ==
- 1994: Between April 12 and 13, 1994, heavy rain in the lower Harz mountains led to flooding on the Wipper.

== See also ==
- List of rivers of Saxony-Anhalt
