= Große Sülze =

River in Germany

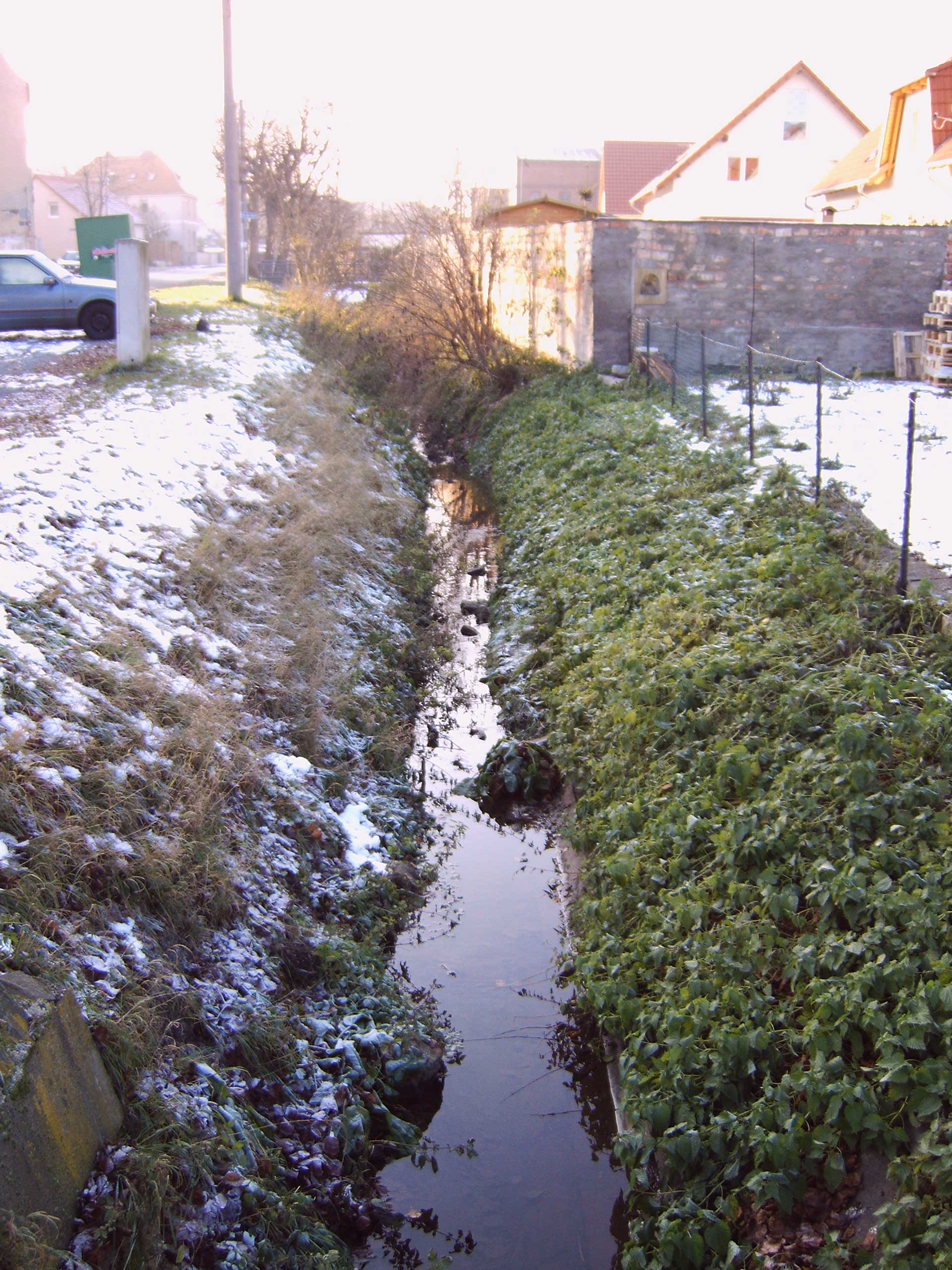

Location
- Country: Germany
- State: Saxony-Anhalt

Physical characteristics
- Mouth
  - location: Schrote
  - coordinates: 52.2264°N 11.6440°E

Basin features
- Progression: Schrote→ Ohre→ Elbe→ North Sea

Große Sülze is a river of Saxony-Anhalt, Germany. It flows into the Schrote near Barleben. In English, Große Sülze means 'Big Brawn'. The following trees have been planted along its banks: Field Maple, Sycamore, Hornbeam, Ash and Linden.

== See also ==
- List of rivers of Saxony-Anhalt
