= Hadeborn =

River in Germany

Location
- Country: Germany
- States: Saxony-Anhalt

Physical characteristics
- Mouth
  - location: Wipper
  - coordinates: 51.6464°N 11.5150°E

Basin features
- Progression: Wipper→ Saale→ Elbe→ North Sea

Hadeborn is a river of Saxony-Anhalt, Germany. It flows into the Wipper in Hettstedt.

== See also ==
- List of rivers of Saxony-Anhalt
