= Mühlenteich (Wismar) =

Lake in Wismar, Mecklenburg-Vorpommern, Germany

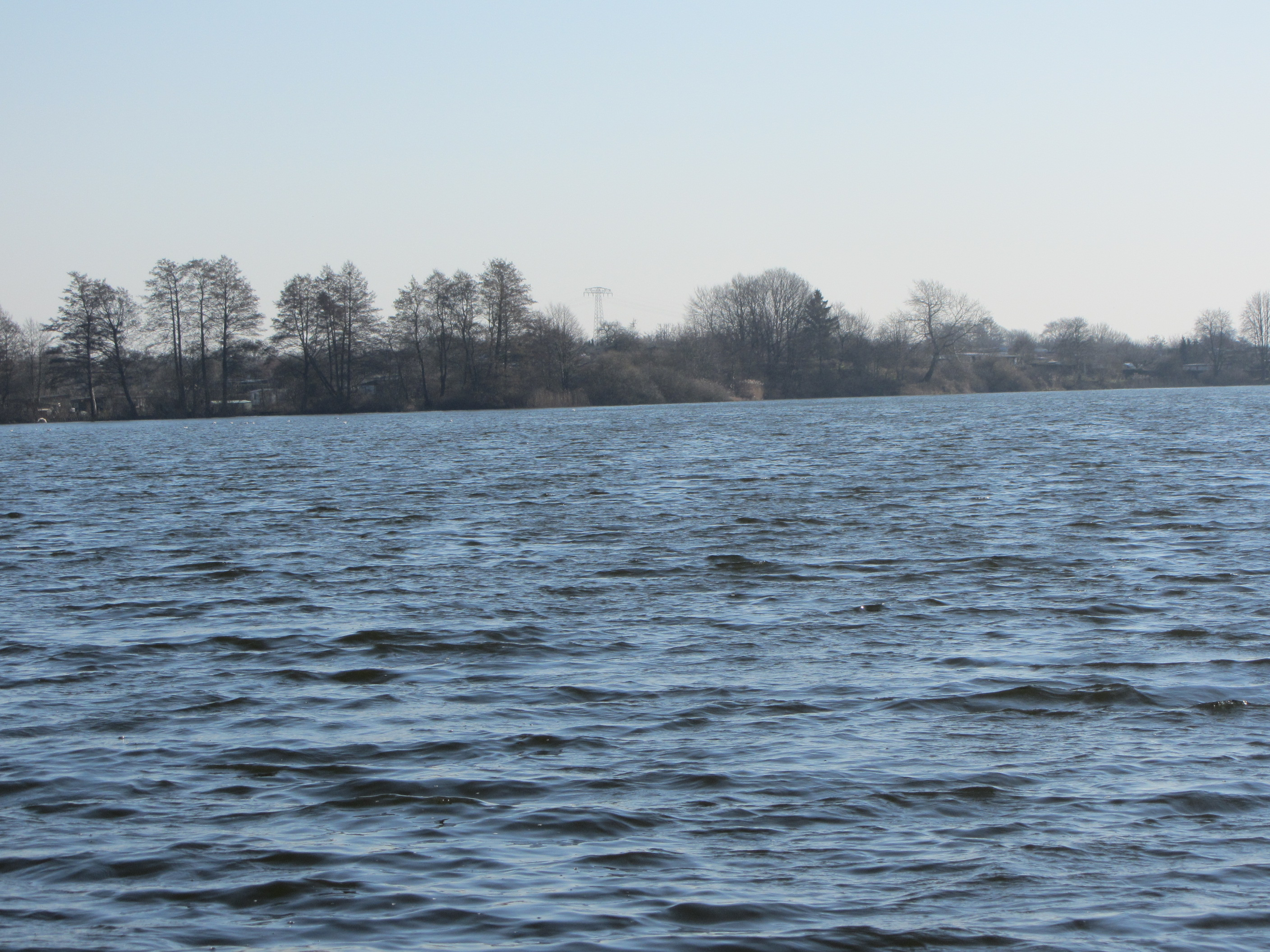

- Location within Mecklenburg-Vorpommern
- Location: Wismar, Mecklenburg-Vorpommern, Germany
- Coordinates: 53°53′9.71″N 11°28′48.09″E
- Primary inflows: Wallensteingraben
- Primary outflows: Wallensteingraben, Mühlenbach
- Basin countries: Germany
- Surface area: 48.2 ha (119 acres)
- Average depth: 2 m (6 ft 7 in)
- Surface elevation: 4 m (13 ft)
- Settlements: Wismar

Mühlenteich is a lake in Wismar, Mecklenburg-Vorpommern, Germany. Its elevation is 4 m (13 ft) and its surface area is 0.482 km^{2} (0.186 sq mi). The water body is highly indented. There is a prominent southern bay with two smaller islands and a distinct northern bay. The Mühlenteich has a north-south extension of about 1700 metres and a west-east extension of about 400 metres. Large parts of the pond shore, especially in the south, are marshy and mostly silted up. The Wallenstein Ditch, which is dammed in the pond, flows into it in the southwest and leaves it again in the north. In addition, the Mühlenbach flows off in the west through the inner city towards the Baltic Sea. Another tributary is a ditch from the south-east. The south-western part of the water body belongs to the nature reserve Teichgebiet Wismar-Kluß. The pond is used for commercial trout farming.

At times, the Mühlenteich served as Wismar's drinking water supply. When the water pipes from springs near Metelsdorf were cut during the siege of Wismar in 1675, drawing water from only one region proved disadvantageous. Therefore, from 1685 onwards, water was additionally pumped from the mill pond into a former defence tower, which was part of the city's fortifications and is now called the Old Water Tower, and piped from there. Due to the danger of cholera, the water from the pond was not allowed to be mixed with Metelsdorf water since 1892.
