= Milde (river) =

River in Germany

Location
- Country: Germany
- State: Saxony-Anhalt

Physical characteristics
- Mouth
  - location: Biese
  - coordinates: 52.7173°N 11.5218°E
- Length: 36 km (22 mi)

Basin features
- Progression: Biese→ Aland→ Elbe→ North Sea

The Milde is a river in the German state of Saxony-Anhalt, source river of the Biese. It is 36 kilometres (22 mi) long, whereas the total Milde-Biese-Aland system is 97 kilometres (60 mi) long. The Milde flows into the Biese near Meßdorf. The town of Kalbe (Milde) in Saxony-Anhalt is surrounded by river Milde and its tributaries which protected the town without a town wall or a moat in the Middle Ages. Many small bridges were built in the centre of Kalbe which is called "Town of 100 Bridges".

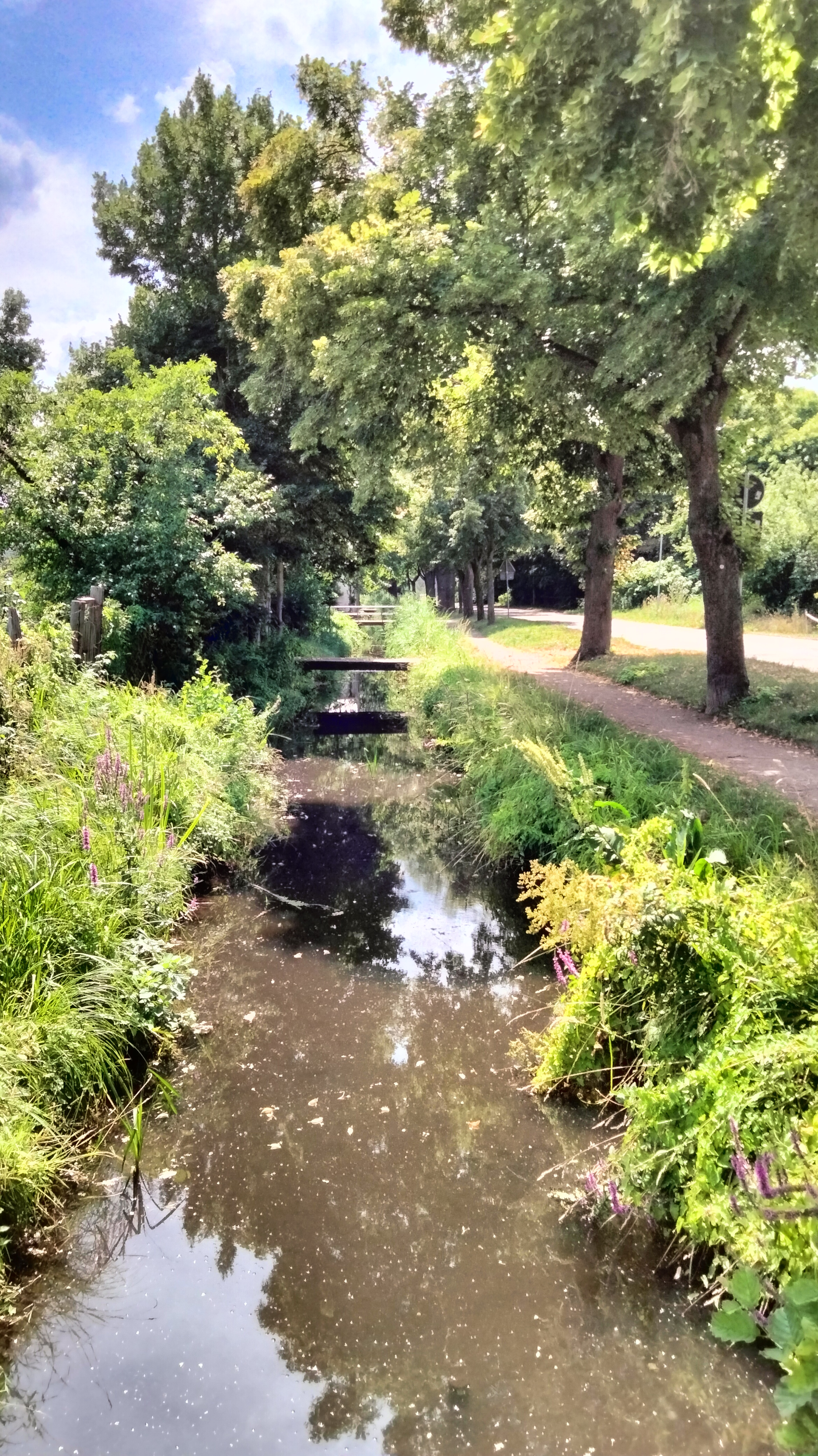
River Milde in the centre of Kalbe (Milde)

== See also ==
List of rivers of Saxony-Anhalt
