= Walbke =

River in Germany

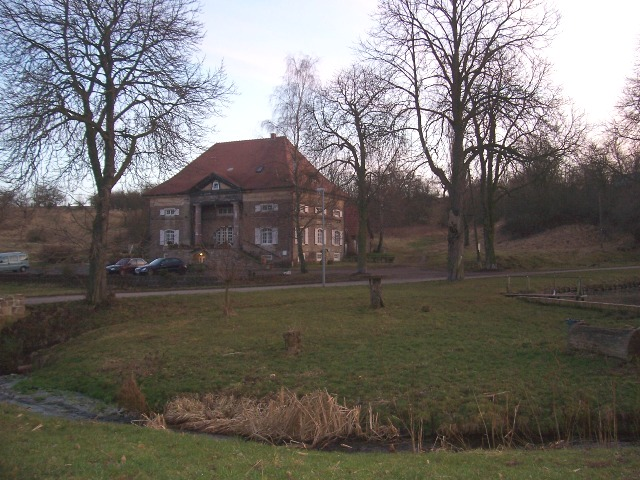

Location
- Country: Germany
- State: Saxony-Anhalt

Physical characteristics
- Mouth
  - location: Wipper
  - coordinates: 51.6631°N 11.5292°E

Basin features
- Progression: Wipper→ Saale→ Elbe→ North Sea

Walbke is a river of Saxony-Anhalt, Germany. It flows into the Wipper near Wiederstedt.

== See also ==
- List of rivers of Saxony-Anhalt
