= Stockbach =

River in Germany

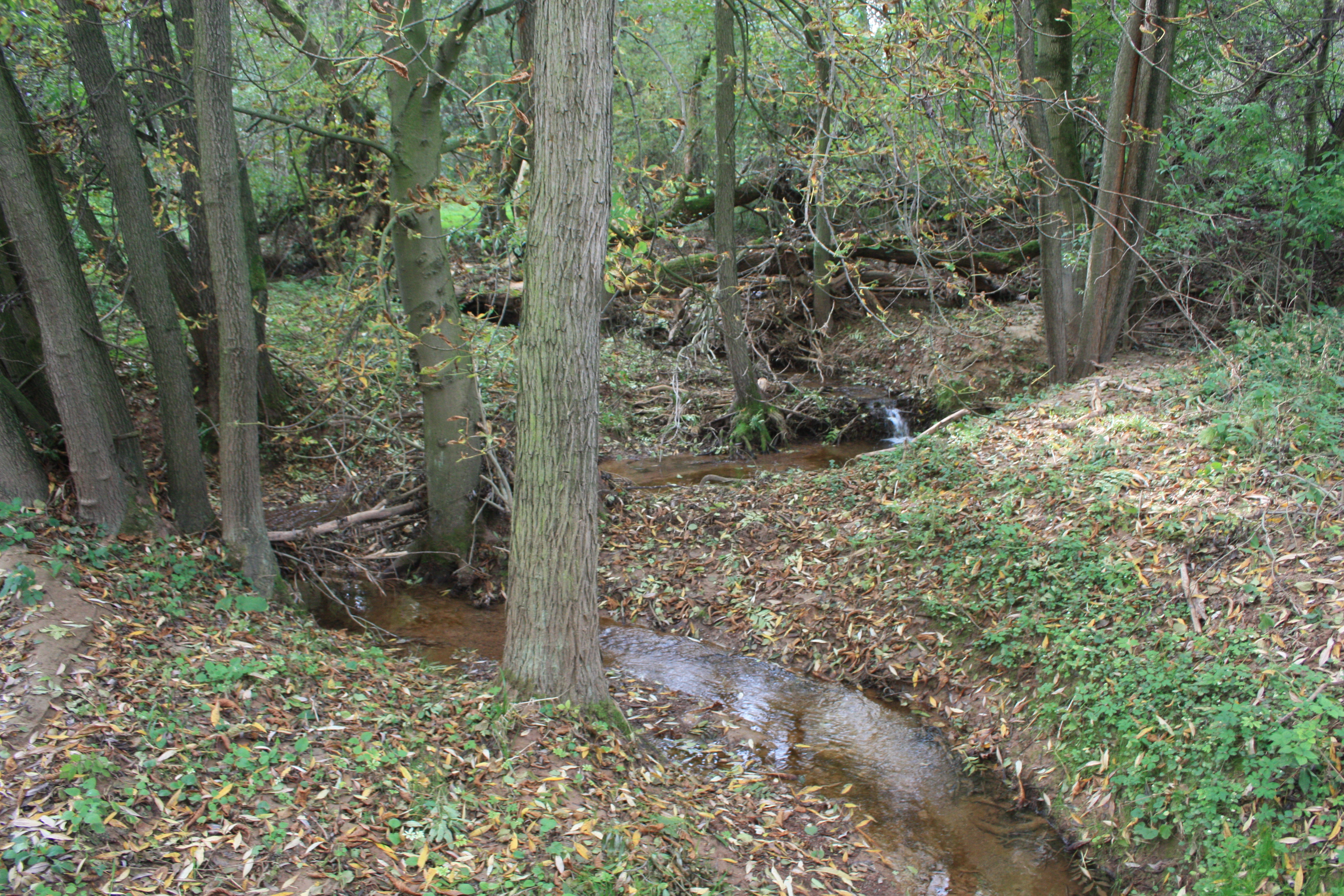

Location
- Country: Germany
- State: Saxony-Anhalt

Physical characteristics
- Source
  - coordinates: 51°37′27″N 11°24′12″E
- Mouth
  - location: Wipper
  - coordinates: 51.6265°N 11.5075°E
- Length: 8 km

Basin features
- Progression: Wipper→ Saale→ Elbe→ North Sea

Stockbach is a river of Saxony-Anhalt, Germany. It flows into the Wipper in Großörner.

== See also ==
- List of rivers of Saxony-Anhalt
