= Geisel valley =

Valley in Saxony-Anhalt, Germany

Coordinates: 51°18′28″N 11°52′09″E

The Geisel valley (German: Geiseltal) is a valley in Saxony-Anhalt, Germany, situated west of Merseburg, Saalekreis district. It is named after the River Geisel which rises in Mücheln and is a tributary of the Saale, just under 25 km (16 mi) long.

Its main settlements are Braunsbedra and Mücheln, which in the future will merge into the 'collective municipality' of Geiseltal. The Geisel valley was quarried for coal from 1698 until the mines were closed in 1994; The mining of brown coal is first attested for 1698 near the Zöbigker grove but is most likely to be older. Initially, only twelve smaller pits emerged at the beginning of the Industrial Revolution in the late 19th century, which spread to large areas; ultimately, the Braunsbedra-Geiseltal mines became one of the largest connected mining regions in Germany.

== Coal/Lignite mining ==
At the beginning of the twentieth century, the region was characterized by mostly independent pits (Elisabeth 1906, Großkayna 1907, Beuna 1907, Cecilie 1907, Rheinland 1908, Leonhardt 1910, Pfännershall 1911). In the course of the further processing of coal, nine briquetting plants were built. The immense coal deposits in the Geisel Valley and its favorable transport conditions also led to the development of several chemical plants settled. BASF constructed construction of the ammonia plant Merseburg of BASF (the later Leuna plants) with its subsidiary Buna-Werke, the world's first synthetic rubber producer (founded in April 1936), as well as the mineral oil plant built by Wintershall AG from 1936, is significant in this context Lützkendorf, a plant for fuel and lubrication oil production. After the Second World War, there was a further intensification of the dismantling. The Mächeln opencast mine, founded in 1949 by merging several existing abbeys (including Pauline, Elisabeth, Emma, and Elise II), charred mainly the western Geisel Valley, while the opencast mining Großkayna, founded 1949 (from the Grube Rheinland) and Kayna-Süd. Founded in 1948, in the excavation operation encountered large open-pit open-cast mining in Großkayna to a depth of 130 m (427 ft) in the open-cast mining area Mücheln up to 70 m (230 ft) (natural upper edge at about 110 m (361 ft) above sea level).

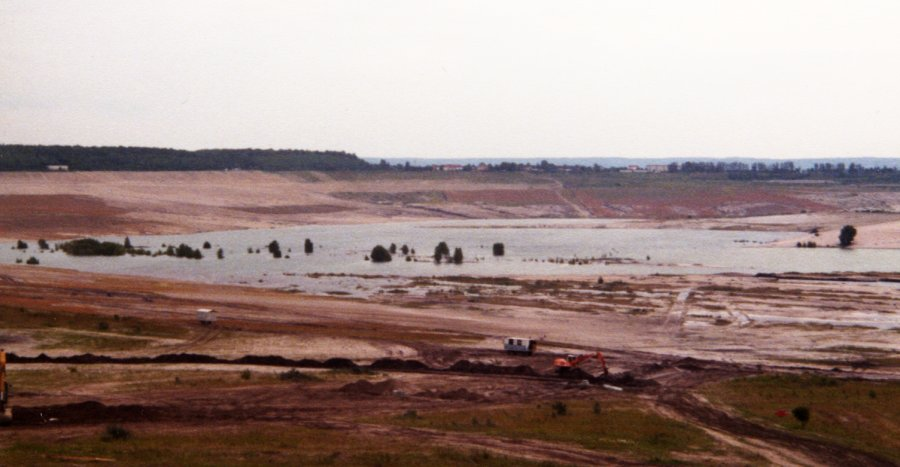
In the late 1990s, the old pit mine was converted to a recreation area, flooding the deepest part of the mine with water.

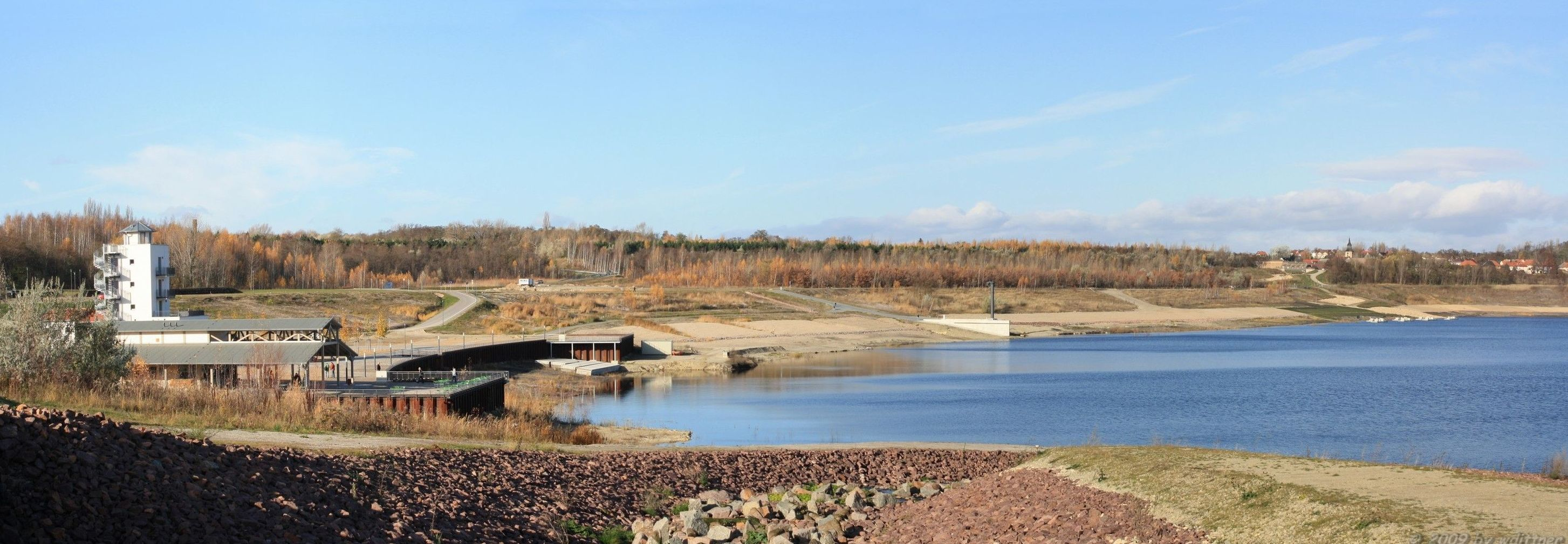
The remains of the pit mine were flooded to create recreational and natural areas.

In the 1990s, the embankments of the Mücheln opencast mine were moved; around 26 million cubic meters of earth mass were flattened and support the embankment. The completion of these measures began on June 30, 2003 with the flooding of the remaining hole to the Geiseltalsee, which on April 26, 2011, has a water level at 98 m (322 ft) above sea level. As of 2015, the lake occupied an area of 18.9 km^{2} (7 sq mi), which makes it the twelfth largest lake in Germany. Subsequently, the open-cast mine Kayna-Süd was shut down and rehabilitated as early as 1972, resulting in the Südfeldsee with 2.6 km^{2} (1 sq mi) of water surface. The excavation work in Großkayna had already been completed in 1965 and the remaining hole was used until 1995 as a rinsing dump for waste from the Leuna and Buna plants and then flooded to a 2.1 km^{2} (1 sq mi) lake (Runstedter lake). Both of today's lakes are separated from the Geiseltalsee by a tipping dam up to 140 m (459 ft)

Open-cast mining activities ended in the late 1990s, and subsequently, nature has reclaimed part of the region. Favored by the position of the host valley in the wind shadow of the Harz creates a special microclimate characterized by a mild average annual average temperature and a relatively low annual precipitation of about 500 mm (20 in). Because of its location, it belongs to the Middle-German dry area. Due to the sandy soil, special flora and fauna community has re-emerged, especially on the northern edge of the valley. In addition, the Geiseltalsee also provides prerequisites for viticulture; In 2002 the first grapes were harvested (Spätburgunder, Cabernet, and Müller-Thurgau). On the north bank is an elevation, the south slope on 25% slope was removed. The north side will be protected by a forest.

== Fossil record ==
The valley is notable for its fossil record. It has yielded many important specimens of the Eocene including Propalaeotherium, Godinotia, Lophiodon, Oxyaenoides, Asiatosuchus, Geoemyda, Trogulidae and Psiloptera. It is also the site of a notable Bronze Age deposit, known as the Frankleben hoard. Paleontologists found fossils 251–243 million years old. Researchers discovered fossil remains of Straight-tusked elephant.

== Seven Years' War ==
The valley near Rossbach, between Reichertswerben and Braunsbedra, was the site of the 5 November 1757 Battle of Rossbach between Prussia and the Allied Armies of France and contingents of the Holy Roman Empire, fighting on behalf of Duchy of Austria during the Seven Years' War. The battle had lasted less than 90 minutes but was instrumental in knocking France out of the Silesian theater of the Seven Years' War. Less than five percent of Frederick the Great's entire force had been engaged, and it decisively defeated an army of 42,000. Frederick's use of operational maneuvers and with a fraction of his entire force—3,500 horsemen, 18 artillery pieces, and 3 battalions of infantry—had defeated an entire army of two of the strongest European powers. Frederick's tactics at Rossbach became a landmark in the history of military art. During this battle, Friedrich Wilhelm von Seydlitz emerged as one of Frederick's greatest cavalry leaders.

Much of the battlefield was destroyed in the course of mining for lignite; from 1864 to 1994, mining was particularly intense and resulted in the destruction of portions of several villages. The extensive open-cast mining operations caused fundamental changes in the landscape and the population: a total of 18 settlements and some 12,500 people were resettled over the time of the mining and manufacturing. Some residents of Rossbach itself were resettled in 1963 and part of the town was destroyed by mining operations in 1963. Today, most of the battlefield is covered in some farmland, vineyards and a park created from flooding the old lignite mine with water; the resulting lake has a surface area of 18.4 km^{2} (7 sq mi); at its deepest point, the lake is 78 m (256 ft) deep.

== See also ==
- Messel pit
