= Aland (river) =

River in Germany

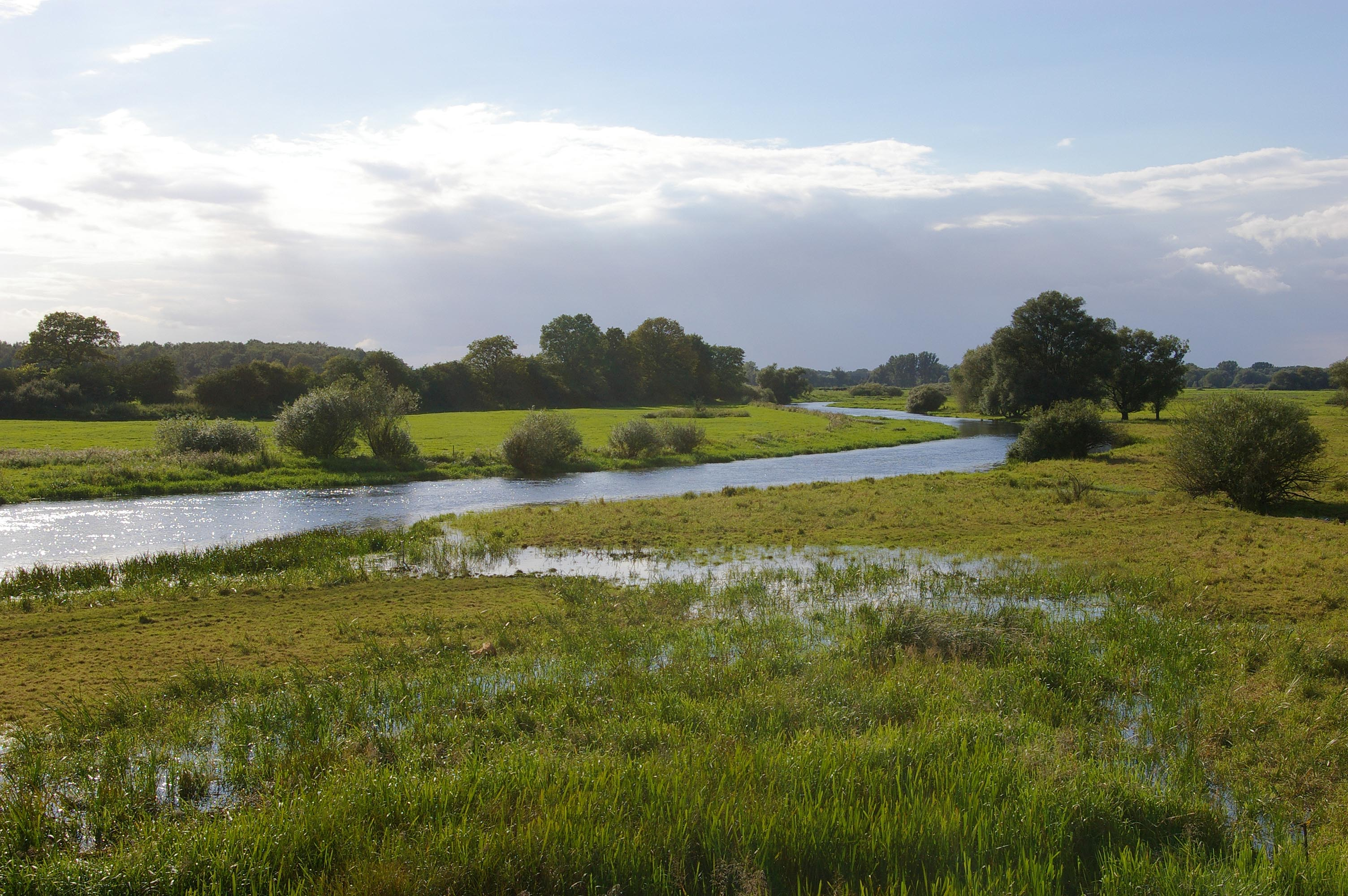
- Aland, lower course

- Location of mouth

Location
- Country: Germany

Physical characteristics
- Source
  - location: Biese, Altmark
  - coordinates: 52.869°N 11.7520°E
- Mouth
  - location: Elbe
  - coordinates: 53.0381°N 11.5685°E
- Length: 28.0 km (17.4 mi)

Basin features
- Progression: Elbe→ North Sea

The Aland is a river in the German states of Lower Saxony and Saxony-Anhalt, left tributary of the Elbe. It is the continuation of the river Biese (downstream from Seehausen), which is the continuation of the river Milde. The Aland is 27 kilometres (17 mi) long, whereas the total Milde-Biese-Aland system is 97 kilometres (60 mi) long. The Aland flows into the Elbe in Schnackenburg.

== See also ==
- List of rivers of Lower Saxony
- List of rivers of Saxony-Anhalt
