= Geisel (river) =

River in Germany

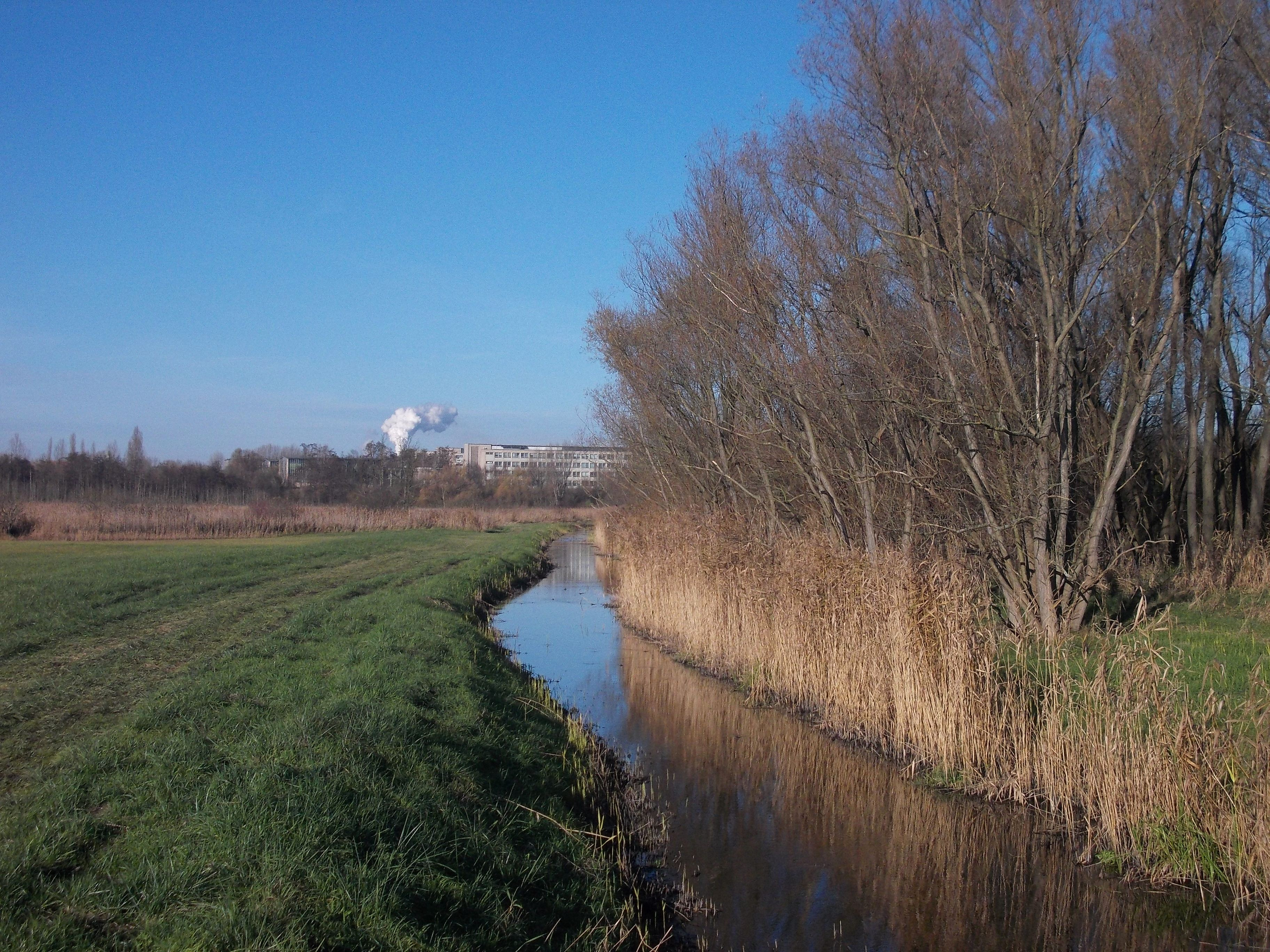

Location
- Country: Germany
- State: Saxony-Anhalt

Physical characteristics
- Mouth
  - location: Merseburg
  - coordinates: 51.3497°N 11.9879°E

Basin features
- Progression: Klia→ Saale→ Elbe→ North Sea

Geisel (German pronunciation: [ˈɡaɪzl̩]) is a river of Saxony-Anhalt, Germany. The source of the Geisel, the Geiselquell, is located in the village of Sankt Micheln just west of Mücheln. The Geisel flows east through Geiseltal, or Geisel valley, until it flows into the Gotthardteich in Merseburg, that's runoff, the Klia, empties into the Saale.

== Origin of name ==
It is probable that the name is related to Geusa, a small village in the Geisel valley dating back to the early 9th century, but since both names date back to the days of Charlemagne, the original spelling and etymology have been lost. One possibility is that the name originates from the Old High German gewi, from the Gothic gavi, (neuter) or gaujis (genitive), a medieval term for a region within a country, often a former or actual province. The name may also originate from the Langobardic patronym Giso, a variant of Adalgis, meaning "noble, precious promise." Finally, the name may be related to the German geiß, meaning "goat".

== See also ==
- List of rivers of Saxony-Anhalt
