= Biese =

River in Germany

Location
- Country: Germany
- State: Saxony-Anhalt

Physical characteristics
- Source
  - location: Milde
- Mouth
  - location: Aland
  - coordinates: 52.8700°N 11.7519°E
- Length: 32.8 km (20.4 mi)

Basin features
- Progression: Aland→ Elbe→ North Sea

The Biese is a river in the German state of Saxony-Anhalt, source river of the Aland. It is the continuation of the river Milde, downstream from Beese.

Biesebad is public bathing site on river Biese in the town of Osterburg in the north of Saxony-Anhalt. The bathing facilities were founded in the 19th century already.

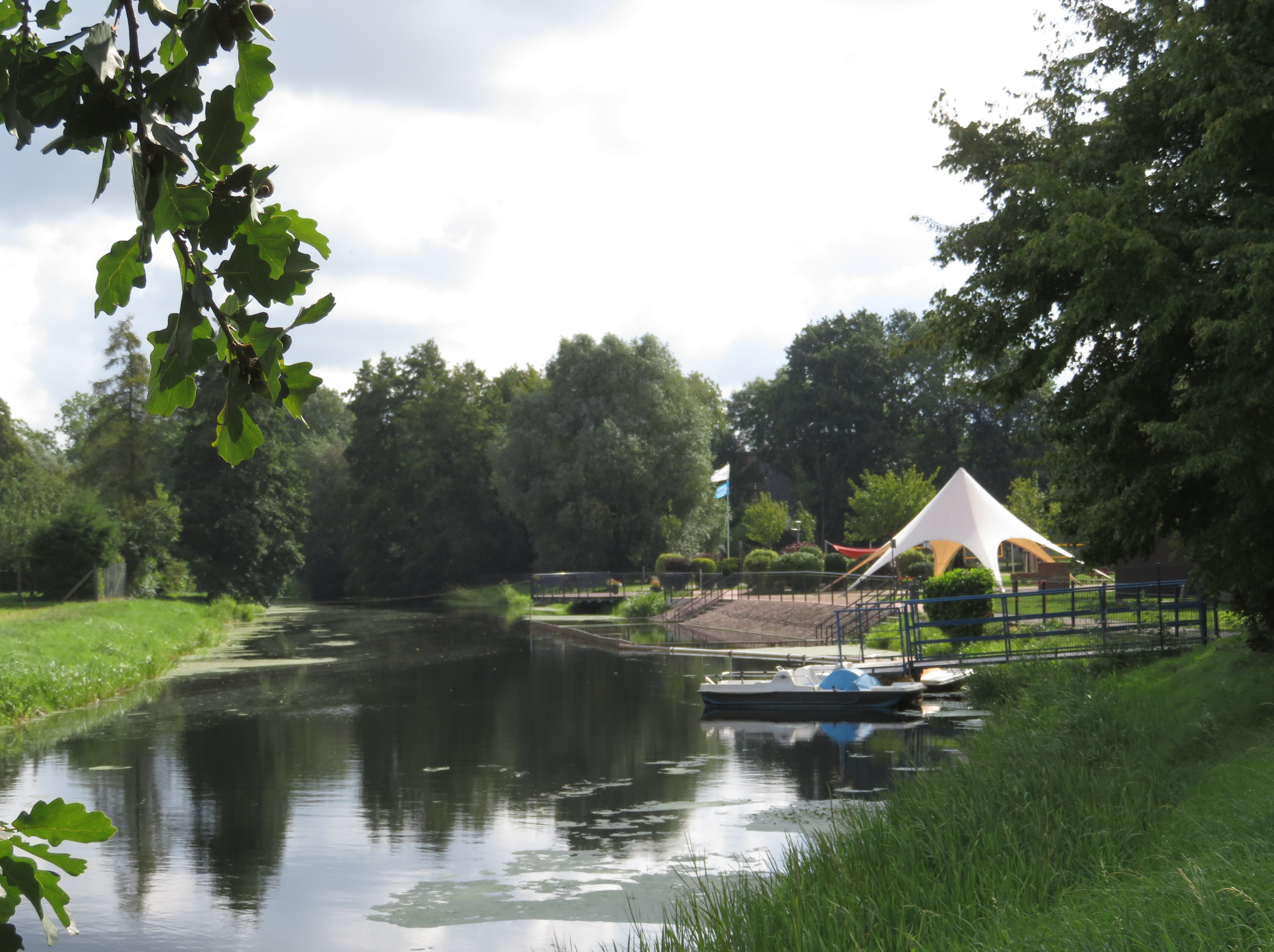
Biesebad in Osterburg

The Biese is 33 kilometres (21 mi) long, whereas the total Milde-Biese-Aland system is 97 kilometres (60 mi) long. The Biese flows into the Aland in Seehausen.

== See also ==
- List of rivers of Saxony-Anhalt
