= Schrote =

River in Germany

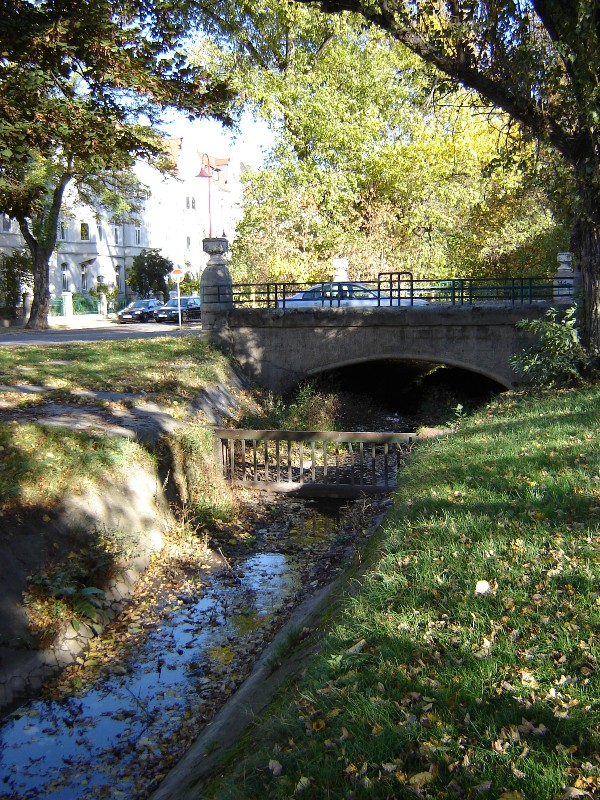

Location
- Country: Germany
- States: Saxony-Anhalt

Physical characteristics
- Mouth
  - location: Ohre
  - coordinates: 52.2402°N 11.6460°E

Basin features
- Progression: Ohre→ Elbe→ North Sea

Schrote is a river of Saxony-Anhalt, Germany. It flows into the Ohre near Wolmirstedt.

== See also ==
- List of rivers of Saxony-Anhalt
