= Wippra =

- Village of Sangerhausen
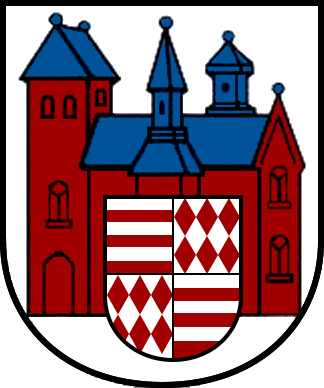
- Coat of arms
- Interactive map of Wippra
- Location within Germany Location within Saxony-Anhalt
- Coordinates: 51°34′00″N 11°16′59″E
- Country: Germany
- State: Saxony-Anhalt
- District: Mansfeld-Südharz
- Town: Sangerhausen

Area
  - Total: 46.09 km^{2} (17.80 sq mi)
- Elevation: 320 m (1,050 ft)

Population (2020)
  - Total: 1,351
  - Density: 29.31/km^{2} (75.92/sq mi)
- Time zone: UTC+01:00 (CET)
  - Summer (DST): UTC+02:00 (CEST)
- Postal codes: 06543
- Dialling codes: 034775
- Vehicle registration: MSH

Wippra is a former municipality in the Mansfeld-Südharz district, Saxony-Anhalt, Germany. Since 1 January 2008, it has been part of the town of Sangerhausen.
