= Sellegraben =

River in Germany

Location
- Country: Germany
- State: Saxony-Anhalt

Physical characteristics
- Mouth
  - location: Brummeckebach
  - coordinates: 51.6861°N 10.8418°E

Basin features
- Progression: Brummeckebach→ Hassel→ Rappbode→ Bode→ Saale→ Elbe→ North Sea

Sellegraben is a small river of Saxony-Anhalt, Germany. It flows into the Brummeckebach near Hasselfelde.

== See also ==
- List of rivers of Saxony-Anhalt
