= Uhlenbach =

Uhlenbach may refer to:

- Uhlenbach (Werre), a river of North Rhine-Westphalia, Germany, tributary of the Werre
- Uhlenbach (Selke), a river of Saxony-Anhalt, Germany, tributary of the Selke
  - Großer Uhlenbach, a river of Saxony-Anhalt, Germany, tributary of the Uhlenbach
  - Kleiner Uhlenbach, name of the Uhlenbach in its upper course
