= Leine (disambiguation) =

Leine is a river of Thuringia and Lower Saxony, Germany, a tributary to the Aller.

Leine may also refer to:

- Leine (Eine), a river of Saxony-Anhalt, Germany, tributary of the Eine
- Leine (Helme), a river of Saxony-Anhalt, Germany, tributary of the Helme
- Leine, the former German name of the village of Linie, in western Poland

== People with that name ==
- Kim Leine (born 1961), Danish-Norwegian author
- Leine Loman (born 1967), former Dutch international cricketer

== See also ==
- Leine Uplands, a region in Germany which forms a part of the Lower Saxon Hills and lies along the Leine
- Leine Formation, a geologic formation of the Permian, in Germany
- Leine Palace, the former residence of the Hanoverian kings and current seat of the Landtag of Lower Saxony, in Hanover, Germany
- Léine croich, a style of shirt (often yellow) historically worn in Ireland and the Scottish Highlands
- Lèine bhàn, a white or off-white smock formerly worn to church in Scotland by transgressors of ecclesiastical law
