= Klare =

Klare is a surname. Notable people with the surname include:

- Arno Klare, German politician
- George R. Klare, professor of psychology and dean at Ohio University and World War II veteran
- Herman Klare, chemistry academic
- Karl Klare, professor at Northeastern University School of Law
- Léon Klares, Luxembourgian sprint canoer
- Max Klare (born 2003), American football player
- Michael Klare, professor of Peace and World Security Studies at Hampshire College and defense correspondent of The Nation magazine

== See also ==
- 1825 Klare, a main-belt asteroid
- Klare Grete, a river in Germany
- Clare (disambiguation)
- Clair (disambiguation)
