= Jagdhausbach =

River in Germany

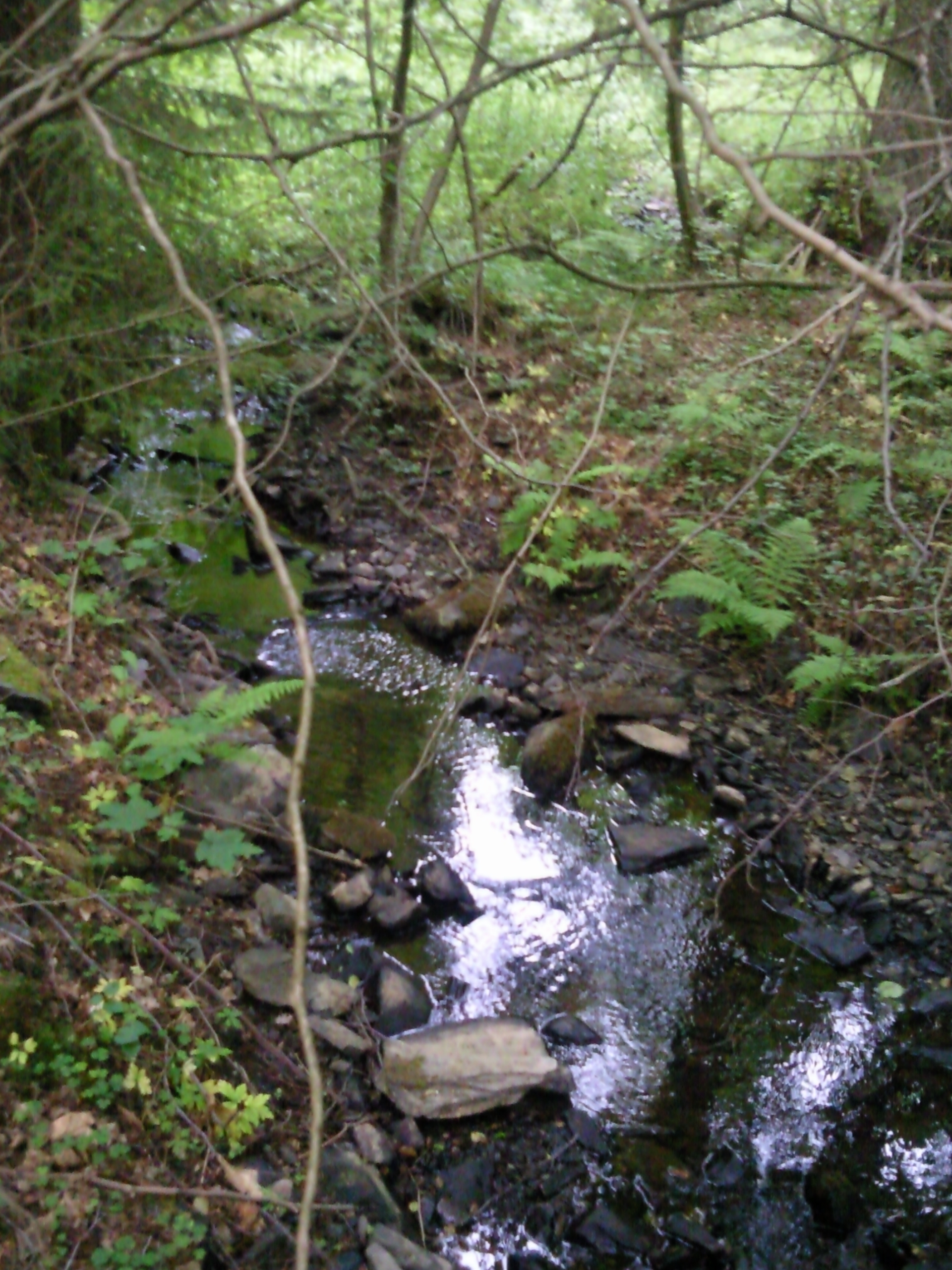

Location
- Country: Germany
- States: Saxony-Anhalt

Physical characteristics
- Mouth
  - location: Krebsbach
  - coordinates: 51.6669°N 11.1211°E

Basin features
- Progression: Krebsbach→ Selke→ Bode→ Saale→ Elbe→ North Sea

Jagdhausbach is a small river of Saxony-Anhalt, Germany. It flows into the Krebsbach near Mägdesprung.

== See also ==
- List of rivers of Saxony-Anhalt
