= Murmelbach =

Murmelbach may refer to:

- Murmelbach (Hassel), a river of Saxony-Anhalt, Germany
- Murmelbach (Wupper), a river of North Rhine-Westphalia, Germany
