= Tarnefitzer Elbe =

River in Germany

Location
- Country: Germany
- State: Saxony-Anhalt

Physical characteristics
- Mouth: Ohre
  - coordinates: 52.4297°N 11.2590°E

Basin features
- Progression: Ohre→ Elbe→ North Sea

Tarnefitzer Elbe (in its lower course: Sichauer Beeke) is a river of Saxony-Anhalt, Germany. It flows into the Ohre near Calvörde.

== See also ==
- List of rivers of Saxony-Anhalt
