= Murmelbach (Hassel) =

River in Germany

Location
- Country: Germany
- States: Saxony-Anhalt

Physical characteristics
- Mouth
  - location: Hassel
  - coordinates: 51°41′52″N 10°50′38″E

Basin features
- Progression: Hassel→ Rappbode→ Bode→ Saale→ Elbe→ North Sea

Murmelbach is a river of Saxony-Anhalt, Germany. It flows into the Hassel near Hasselfelde.

== See also ==
- List of rivers of Saxony-Anhalt
