= Wahnborn =

River in Germany

Location
- Country: Germany
- State: Saxony-Anhalt

Physical characteristics
- Mouth
  - location: Katzsohlbach
  - coordinates: 51.6220°N 10.9124°E

Basin features
- Progression: Katzsohlbach→ Selke→ Bode→ Saale→ Elbe→ North Sea

Wahnborn is a small river of Saxony-Anhalt, Germany. It flows into the Katzsohlbach near Breitenstein.

== See also ==
- List of rivers of Saxony-Anhalt
