= Schäferbach =

River in Germany

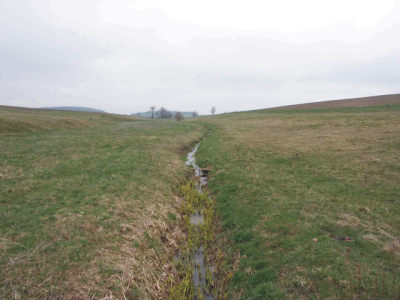

Location
- Country: Germany
- States: Saxony-Anhalt

Physical characteristics
- Mouth
  - location: Uhlenbach
  - coordinates: 51°39′13″N 11°03′35″E

Basin features
- Progression: Uhlenbach→ Selke→ Bode→ Saale→ Elbe→ North Sea

Schäferbach is a small river of Saxony-Anhalt, Germany. It flows into the Uhlenbach near Siptenfelde.

== See also ==
- List of rivers of Saxony-Anhalt
