= Brummeckebach =

River in Germany

Location
- Country: Germany
- State: Saxony-Anhalt

Physical characteristics
- Mouth
  - location: Hassel
  - coordinates: 51.6893°N 10.8598°E

Basin features
- Progression: Hassel→ Rappbode→ Bode→ Saale→ Elbe→ North Sea

Brummeckebach is a small river of Saxony-Anhalt, Germany. It flows into the Hassel in Hasselfelde.

== See also ==
- List of rivers of Saxony-Anhalt
