= Beber (Ohre) =

River in Germany

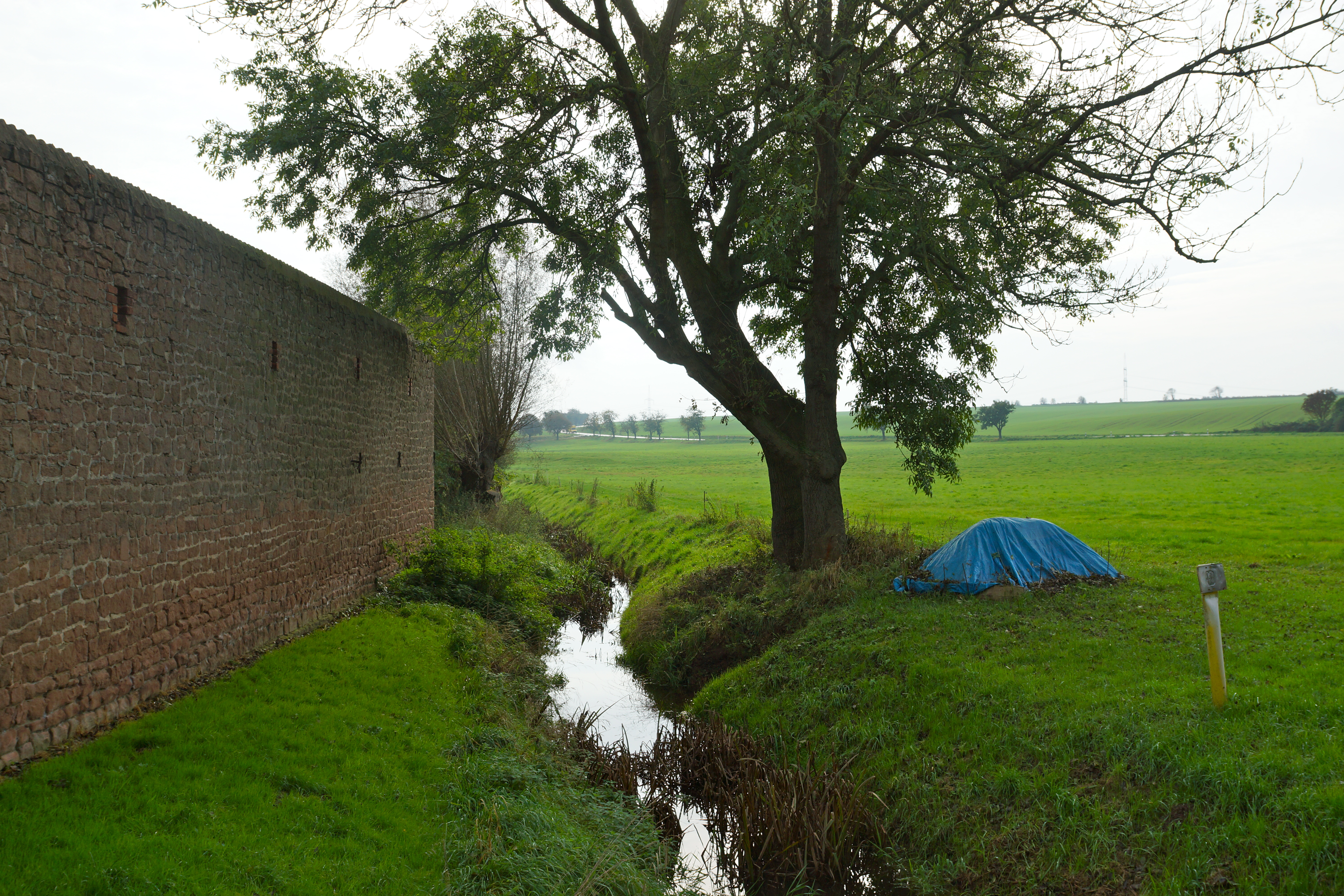
- The Beber at the town of Emden

Location
- Country: Germany
- State: Saxony-Anhalt

Physical characteristics
- Mouth
  - location: Ohre
  - coordinates: 52.2817°N 11.4566°E

Basin features
- Progression: Ohre→ Elbe→ North Sea

Beber is a river of Saxony-Anhalt, Germany. It flows into the Ohre near Haldensleben.

== See also ==
- List of rivers of Saxony-Anhalt
