= Bauerngraben =

Bauerngraben may refer to:

- Bauerngraben (Harz), a nature reserve in the South Harz near Roßla, Saxony-Anhalt, Germany
- Bauerngraben (Ohre), a tributary of the Ohre near Calvörde, Saxony-Anhalt, Germany
- Bauerngraben (Neue Luppe), a tributary of the Neue Luppe in Leipzig, Saxony, Germany
