= Allerbach (Rappbode) =

River in Germany

Location
- Country: Germany
- State: Saxony-Anhalt

Physical characteristics
- Source
  - location: West of Trautenstein
  - coordinates: 51.6938°N 10.7497°E
- Mouth
  - location: North of Trautenstein into the Rappbode through the Rappbode Auxiliary Dam
  - coordinates: 51.7063°N 10.7868°E

Basin features
- Progression: Rappbode→ Bode→ Saale→ Elbe→ North Sea

Allerbach is a river of Saxony-Anhalt, Germany.

The Allerbach springs west of Trautenstein. It is a left tributary of the Rappbode through the Rappbode Auxiliary Dam north of Trautenstein.

== See also ==
- List of rivers of Saxony-Anhalt
