= Taube (river) =

River in Germany

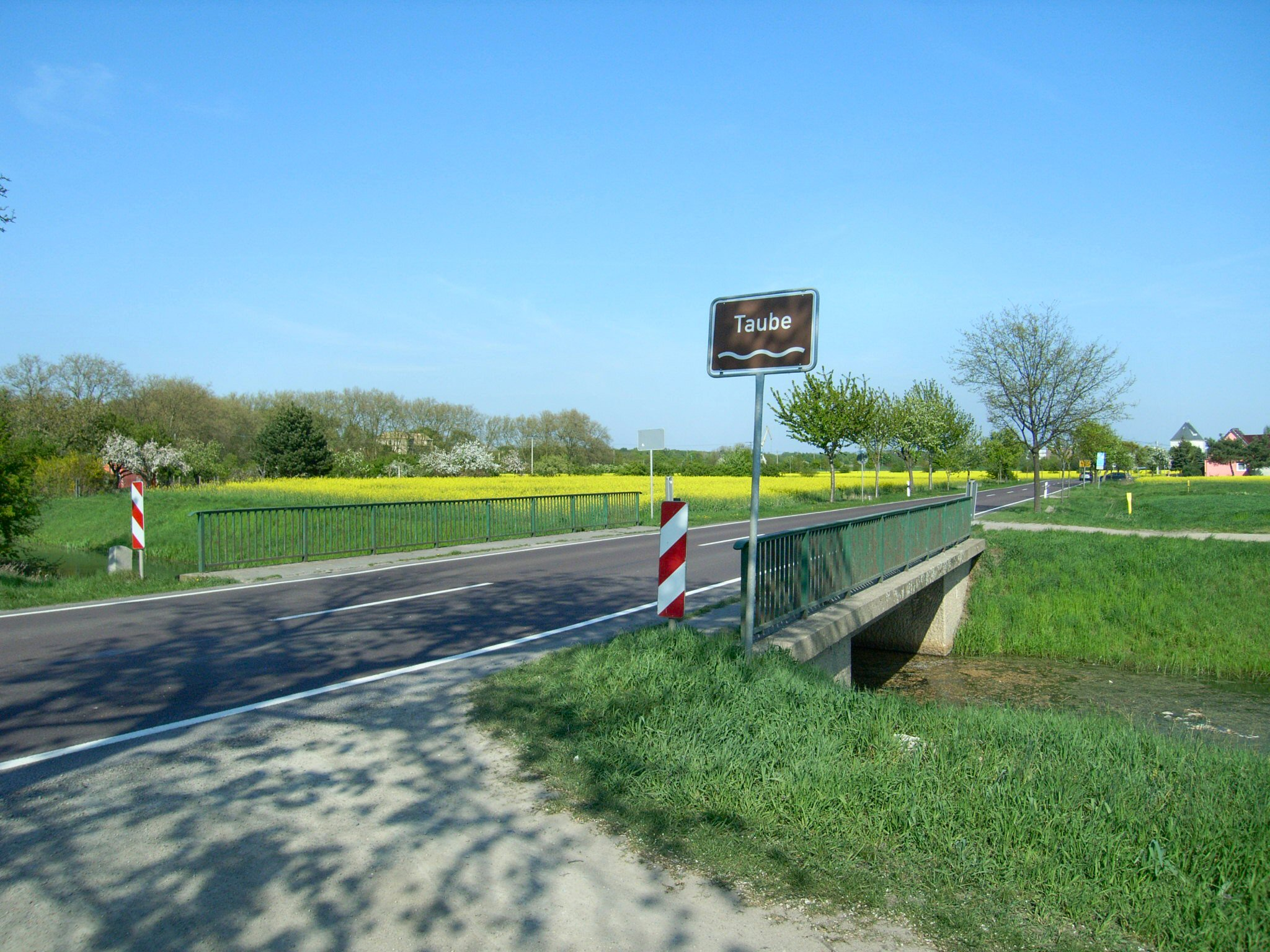

Location
- Country: Germany
- State: Saxony-Anhalt

Physical characteristics
- Mouth
  - location: Saale
  - coordinates: 51.9507°N 11.9175°E

Basin features
- Progression: Saale→ Elbe→ North Sea

Taube is a river of Saxony-Anhalt, Germany. It flows into the Saale near Barby.

The name comes from the Old High German word "toub" or the Middle High German "toup". This means deaf, empty, void, worthless, but also sluggish – suggesting a slow-flowing stream.

== See also ==
- List of rivers of Saxony-Anhalt
