= Wethau (Saale) =

River in Germany

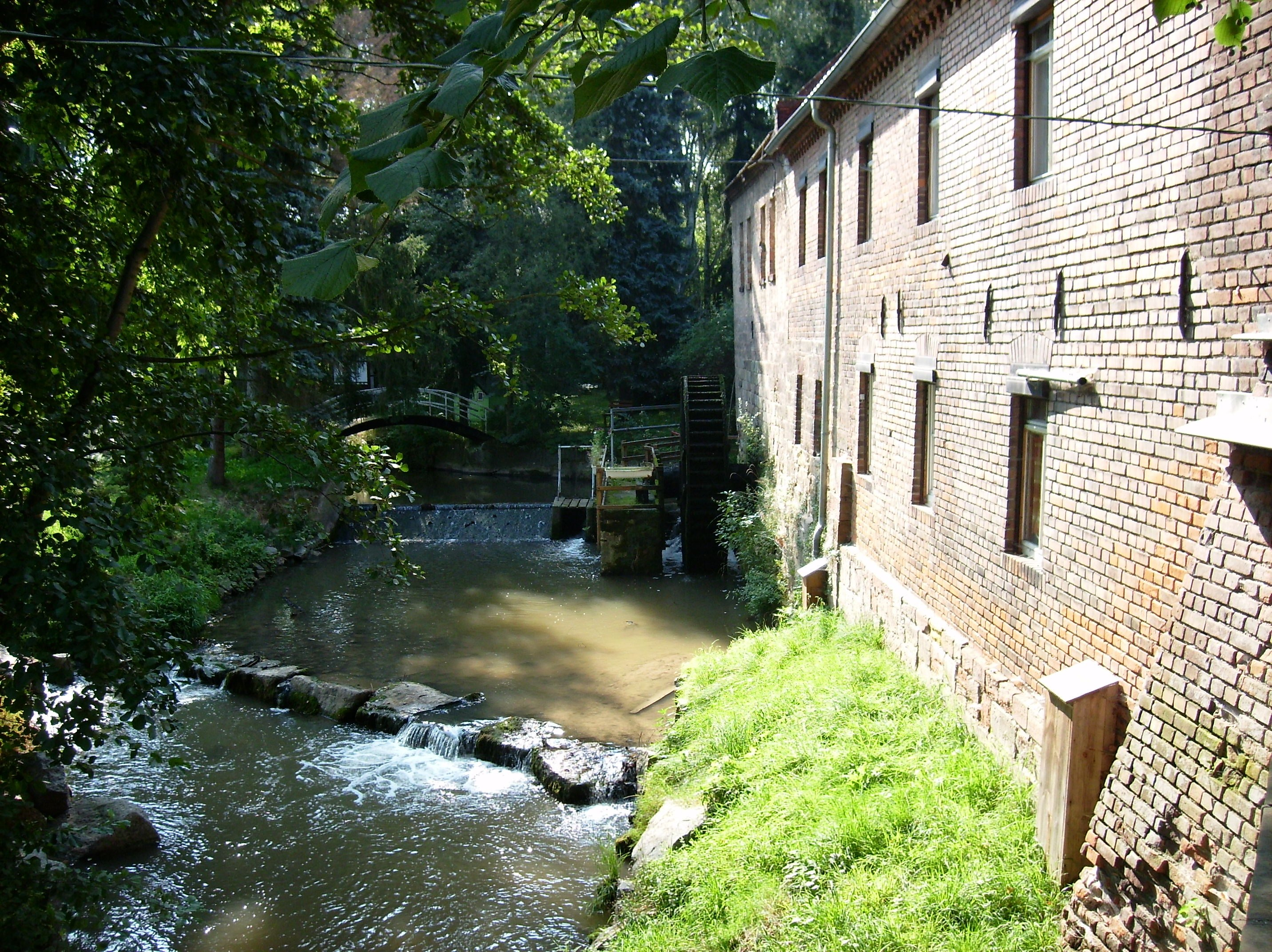

Location
- Country: Germany
- States: Saxony-Anhalt and Thuringia

Physical characteristics
- Source
  - elevation: 330.0 m (1,082.7 ft) NN
- Mouth
  - location: Saale
  - coordinates: 51.1582°N 11.8618°E
  - elevation: 100.1 m (328 ft) NN
- Length: 30 km (19 mi)
- Basin size: 238.1 km^{2} (91.9 mi^{2})

Basin features
- Progression: Saale→ Elbe→ North Sea

The Wethau is a river which springs from Hohendorf, Saale-Holzland-Kreis and runs through Thuringia and Saxony-Anhalt. It flows into the River Saale at Schönburg (Saale), Burgenlandkreis. The River Wethau falls 229.9 metres (754 ft) and is 30 kilometres (19 mi) long.

== See also ==
- List of rivers of Saxony-Anhalt
- List of rivers of Thuringia
