= Hassel Auxiliary Dam =

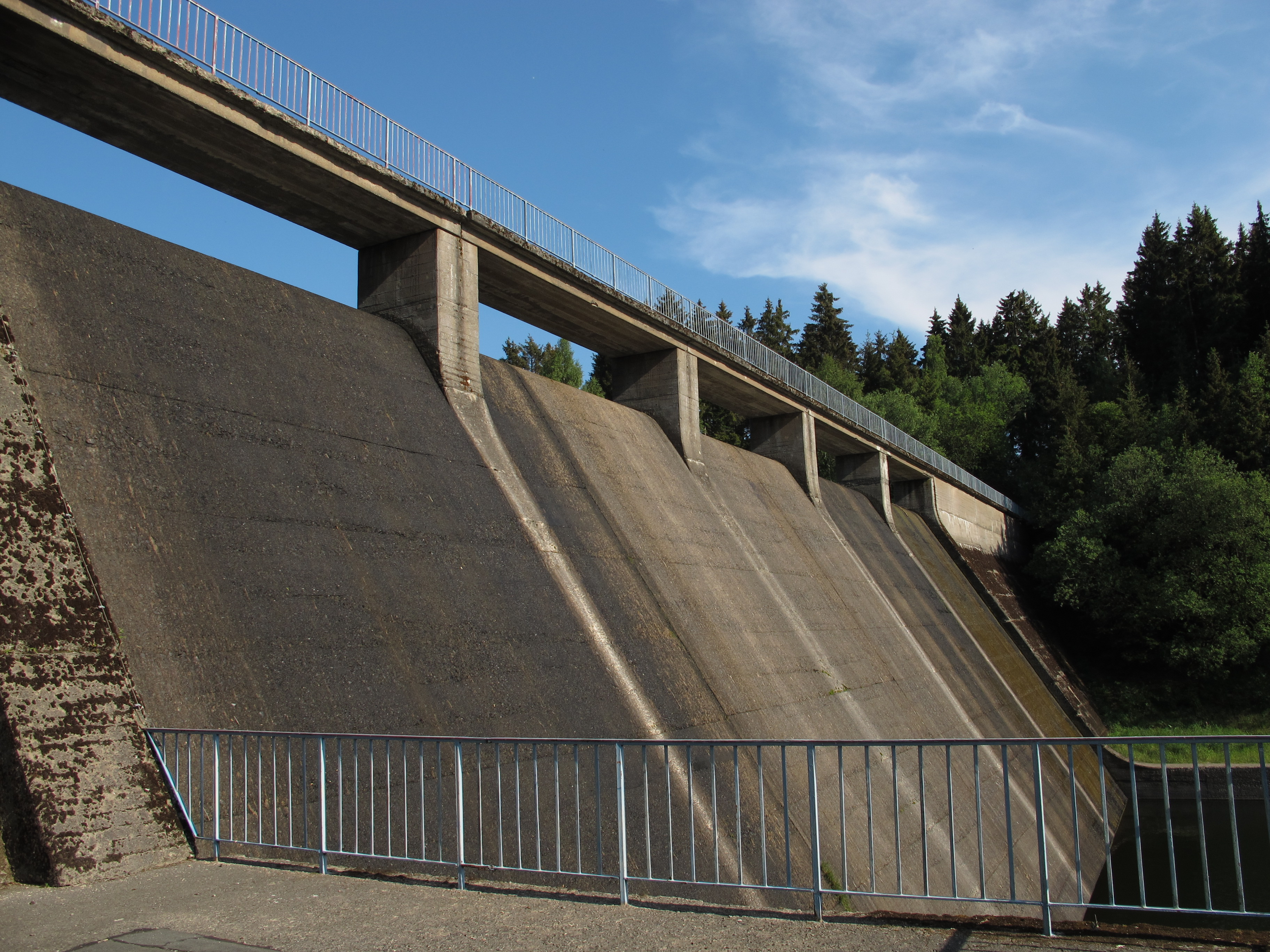
- gravity dam

- Location within Germany
- Country: Germany
- Location: Harz
- Coordinates: 51.7061°N 10.8303°E
- Construction began: 1956
- Opening date: 1960

Dam and spillways
- Height: 21 m (69 ft)
- Length: 141.3 m (464 ft)
- Width (crest): 2.5 m
- Dam volume: 14,000 m³

Reservoir
- Total capacity: 1.64 million m³
- Catchment area: 44.1 km²
- Surface area: 25 ha

The Hassel Auxiliary Dam or Hassel Dam (German: Hasselvorsperre or Vorsperre Hassel) is an auxiliary dam or pre-dam on the Rappbode Reservoir in the Harz mountains of central Germany. It is located near Hasselfelde in the state of Saxony-Anhalt and impounds the waters of the Hassel, the eastern of the two headwaters of the Rappbode Reservoir. Together with its auxiliary dams, the reservoir supplies drinking water and is owned by the Saxony-Anhalt Dam Company (Talsperrenbetrieb Sachsen-Anhalt). The purpose of the auxiliary dam is to pre-clean water mechanically and biologically before it flows into the main reservoir.

In the auxiliary dam, the water settles, allowing impurities to settle. Water can be drawn from various heights through openings in the wall with gate valves and diverted to the reservoir.

The barrier itself is a 21 m high gravity dam. The bedrock consists mostly of grauwacke, but with some thinly laminated argillaceous shale as well.

There is a circular path around the Hassel Auxiliary Dam. The crest of the dam is accessible to pedestrians and the lake may be fished provided permission is obtained.

The Hassel Auxiliary Dam is checkpoint no. 53 in the Harzer Wandernadel hiking trail network.

== See also ==
- List of reservoirs and dams in Germany
- Dams in the Harz
