= Ihle =

River in Germany

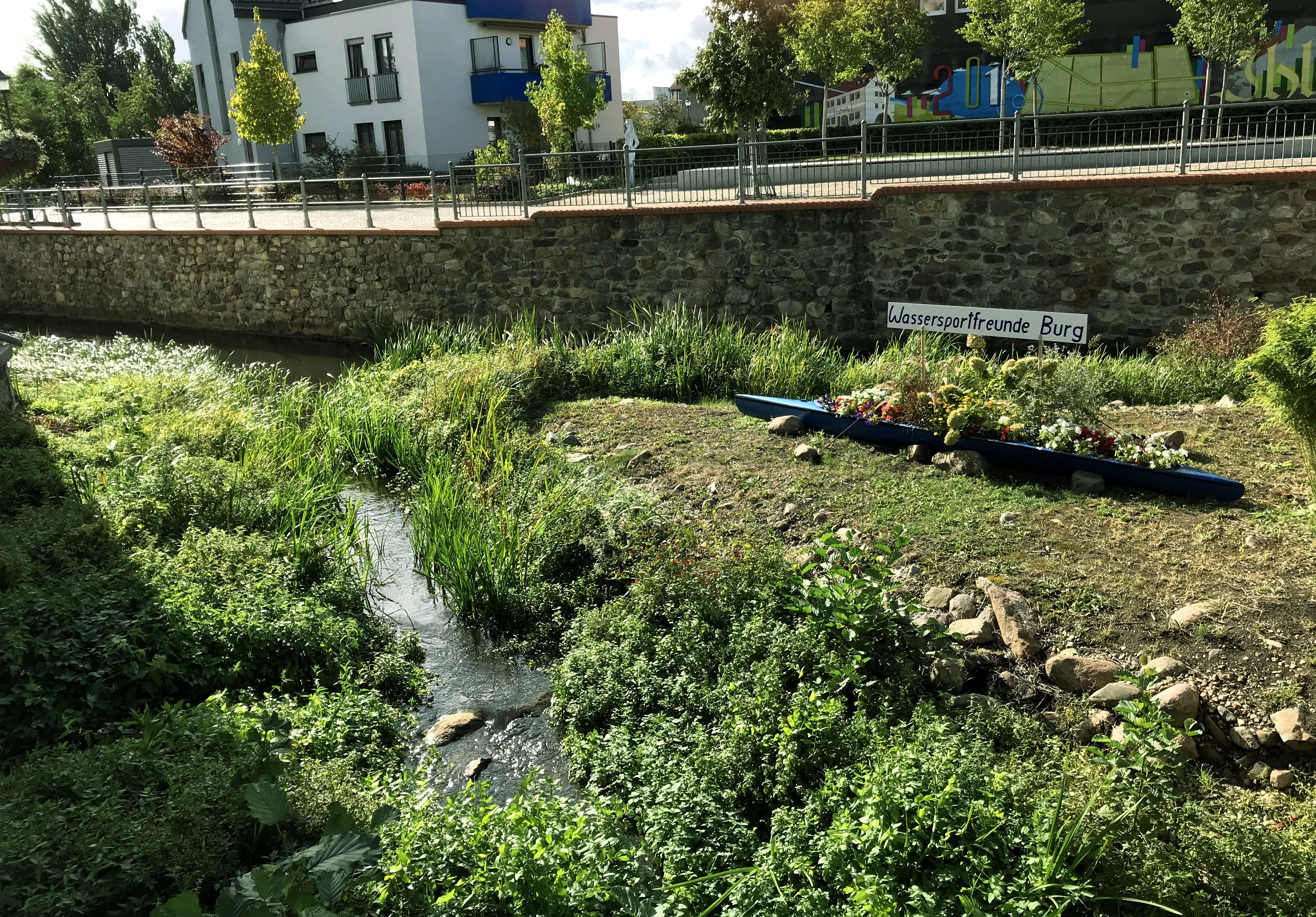

Location
- Country: Germany
- States: Saxony-Anhalt

Physical characteristics
- Mouth: Elbe–Havel Canal
  - coordinates: 52°17′28″N 11°51′41″E

Basin features
- Progression: Elbe–Havel Canal→ Elbe→ North Sea

The Ihle is a river of Saxony-Anhalt, Germany. A former tributary of the Elbe, it discharges into the Elbe–Havel Canal (and its predecessor Ihlekanal) since the 1860s.

== See also ==
- List of rivers of Saxony-Anhalt
