= Pelze =

River in Germany

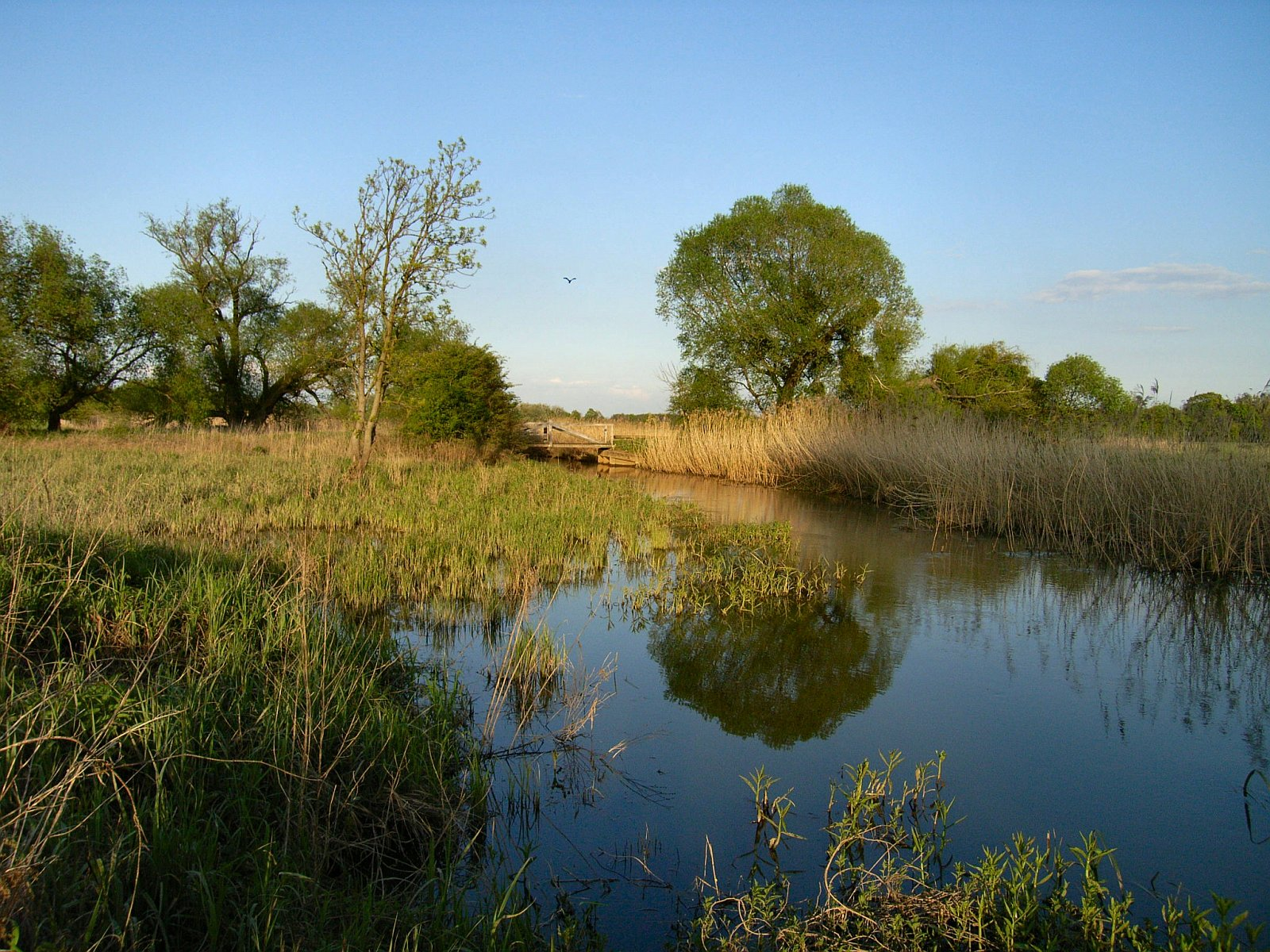

Location
- Country: Germany
- State: Saxony-Anhalt

Physical characteristics
- Mouth
  - location: Mulde
  - coordinates: 51.8717°N 12.2508°E

Basin features
- Progression: Mulde→ Elbe→ North Sea

The Pelze river is a tributary of the Mulde in the Middle Elbe Biosphere Reserve near the confluence into the Elbe, between Dessau and Roßlau.

The watercourse has a length of about 1.5 km and is connected to the Leiner See and Löbben through the flow channel. Lakes are fed by the Kapengraben into the Mulde. During high water levels in the Mulde and Elbe, the Pelze also comes into contact with the Igel-Lache, another old riverbed.

With 21 documented species, the Pelze is considered the most species-rich old riverbed in the nature reserve. In 1927, the Pelze was designated as one of the first protected areas for a mammal in Germany, specifically as a beaver reserve for the European beaver.

At the angle formed by the confluence of the Pelze with the Mulde, in the 12th century, there was the castle "Burg Waldeser" and a village of the same name.

== See also ==
- List of rivers of Saxony-Anhalt
