= Sülze (Elbe) =

River in Germany

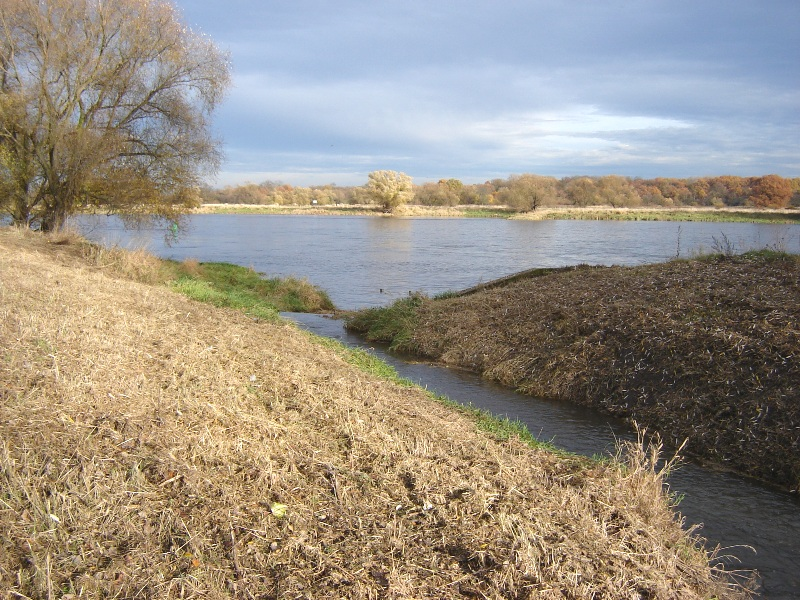

Location
- Country: Germany
- State: Saxony-Anhalt

Physical characteristics
- Mouth
  - location: Elbe
  - coordinates: 52.0822°N 11.6744°E

Basin features
- Progression: Elbe→ North Sea

Sülze (German pronunciation: [ˈzʏltsə]) is a small river of Saxony-Anhalt, Germany. It flows into the Elbe near Magdeburg.

== See also ==
- List of rivers of Saxony-Anhalt
