= Rohne (Helme) =

River in Germany

Location
- Country: Germany
- State: Saxony-Anhalt

Physical characteristics
- Mouth
  - location: Helme
  - coordinates: 51.3810°N 11.3637°E
- Length: 22.8 km

Basin features
- Progression: Helme→ Unstrut→ Saale→ Elbe→ North Sea
- River system: Saale

Rohne is a river of Saxony-Anhalt, Germany. It flows into the Helme near Mönchpfiffel-Nikolausrieth.

== See also ==
- List of rivers of Saxony-Anhalt
