= Bauerngraben (Ohre) =

River in Germany

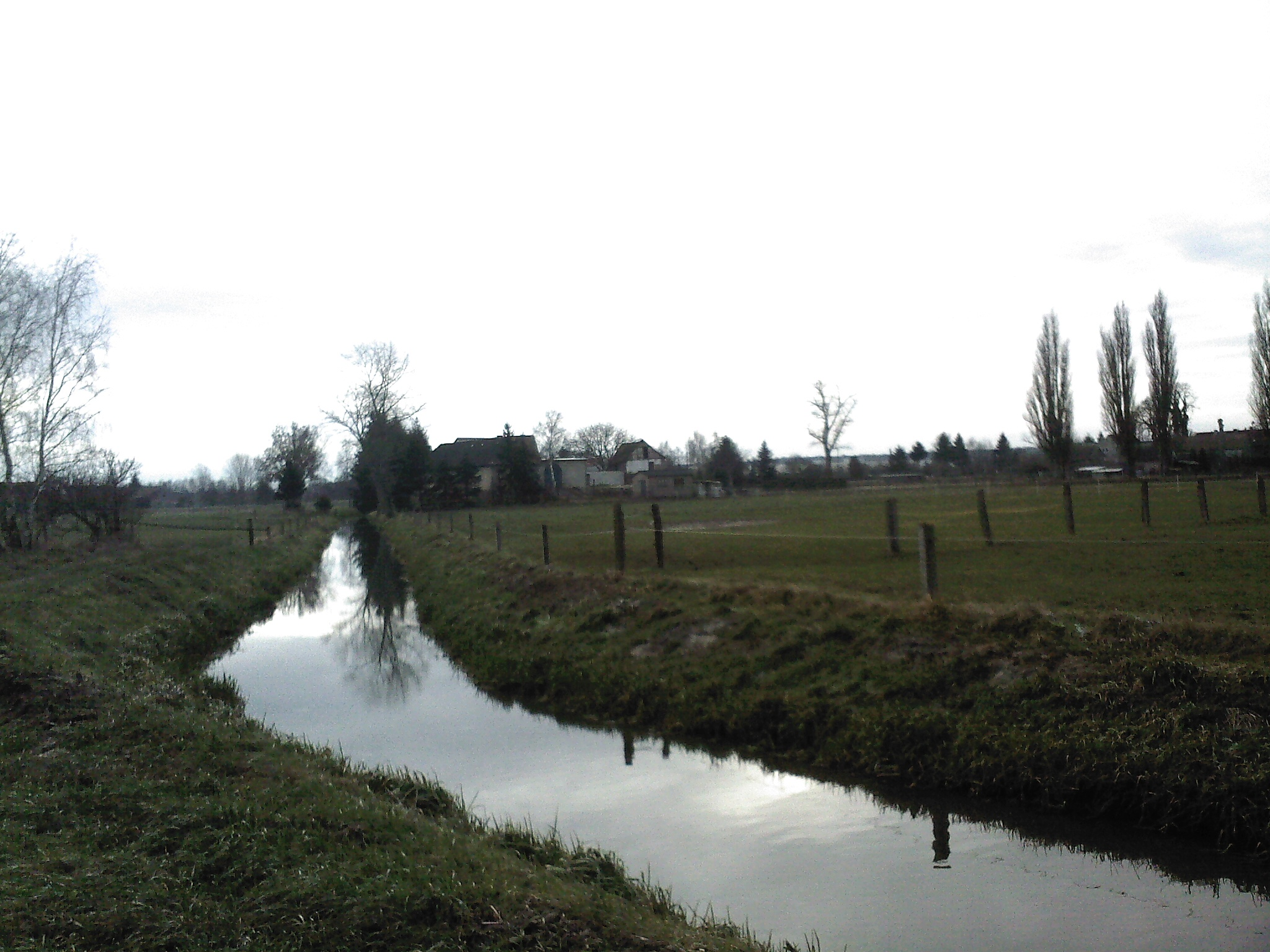

Location
- Country: Germany
- State: Saxony-Anhalt

Physical characteristics
- Mouth
  - location: Ohre
  - coordinates: 52.3947°N 11.3069°E

Basin features
- Progression: Ohre→ Elbe→ North Sea

Bauerngraben is a river of Saxony-Anhalt, Germany. It is a tributary to the Ohre, which it joins in Calvörde.

== See also ==
- List of rivers of Saxony-Anhalt
