= Purnitz =

River in Germany

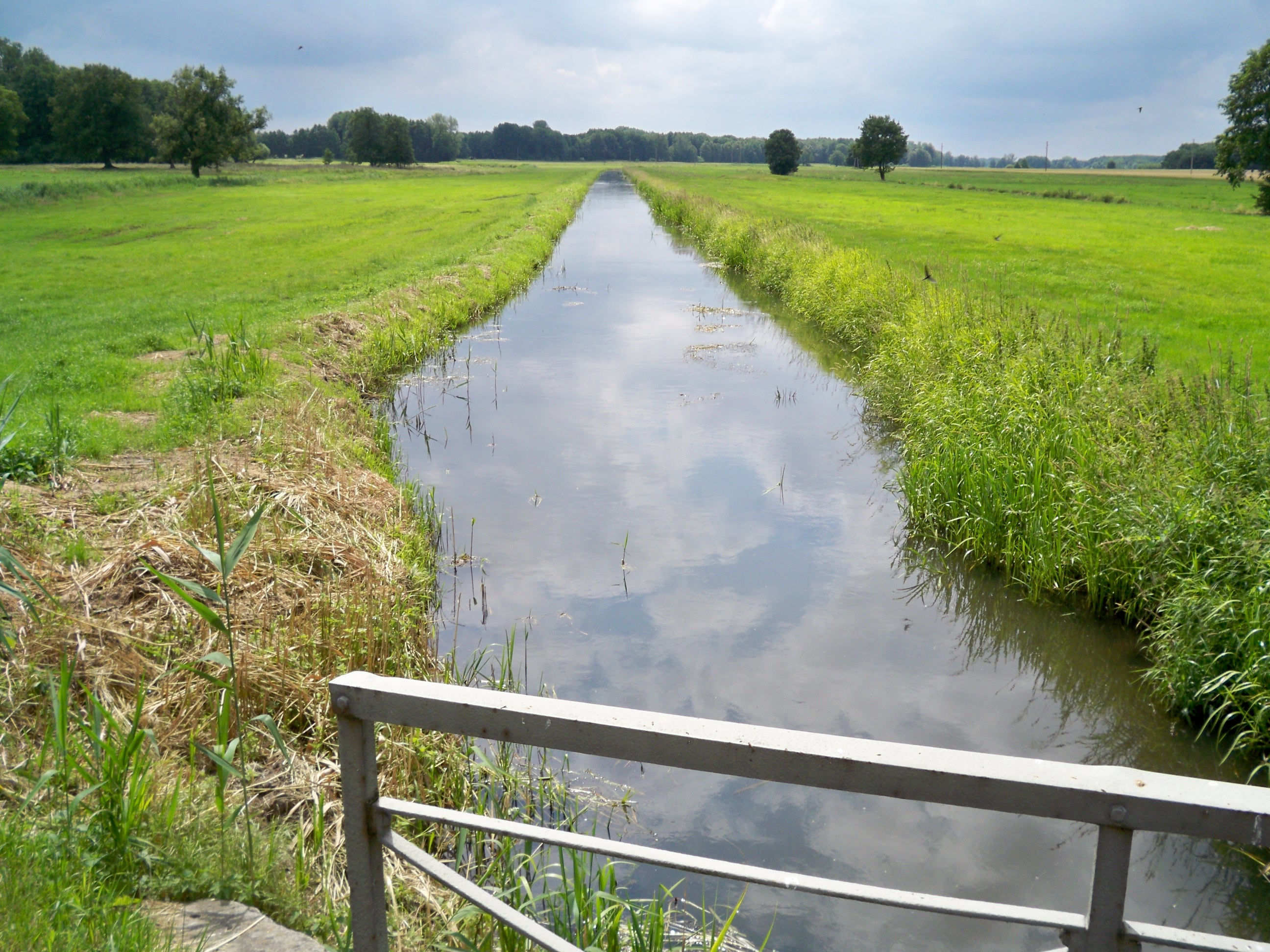

Location
- Country: Germany
- States: Saxony-Anhalt

Physical characteristics
- Mouth
  - location: Jeetze
  - coordinates: 52.7940°N 11.1833°E

Basin features
- Progression: Jeetzel→ Elbe→ North Sea

Purnitz is a river of Saxony-Anhalt, Germany. It flows into the Jeetze south of Salzwedel.

== See also ==
- List of rivers of Saxony-Anhalt
