= Böse Sieben =

River in Germany

Coordinates: 51°30′N 11°38′E

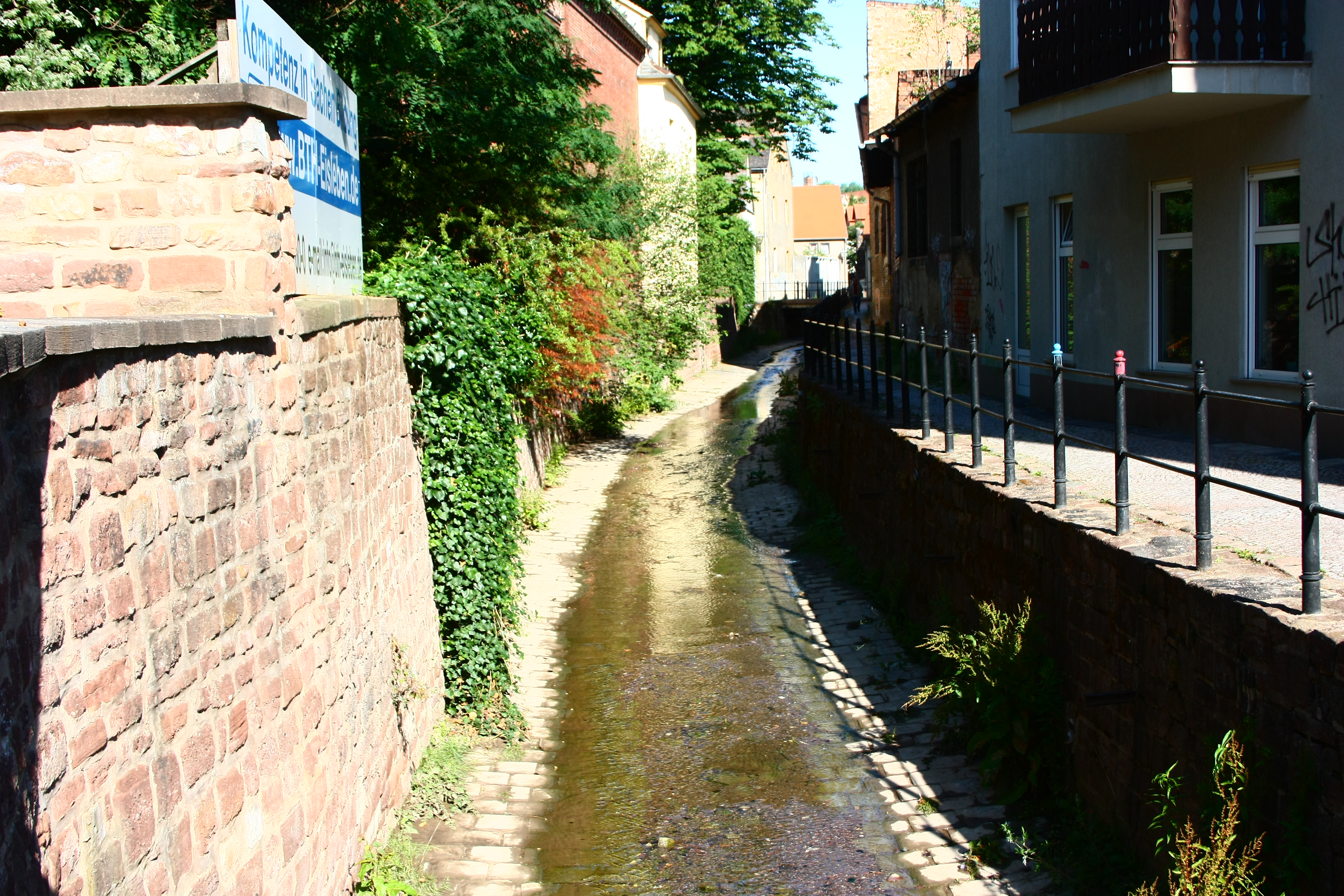
- The Böse Sieben in Eisleben

Location
- Country: Germany
- State: Saxony-Anhalt

Böse Sieben (German for "evil seven") is a river of Saxony-Anhalt, Germany, flowing through the town Eisleben.

The Böse Sieben originates from the eastern regions of the Harz, the sources of the river are the Vietzbach (or Goldbach) and the Dippelsbach, which confluence in Ahlsdorf. Beside from that it has 8 tributaries, the Kliebigbach, Goldgrundbach, Pfaffengrundbach, Saugrundbach, Wolferöder Graben, Hünsche Born, Wilder Graben and the Kalte Graben. Because the river has caused many floods after heavy rainfalls it was named "Willerbach" (mansfeldian dialect for "wild river") in the past. Later in the 19th century it was named "Böse Sieben". It flows through the Süßen See and the Bindersee to the Kernersee, which has no natural outflow.

== Relief ==
On its course to the Süßen See, the Böse Sieben falls well over 200 metres.

== Name ==
The creek's name has been established only since the 19th century; the reasons for this are unclear. Previously it was known as Willerbach ( German for 'wild brook').

== Course ==
The Böse Sieben is fed by two sources, the streams Vietzbach, known also as Goldbach, and Dipplesbach, which unite in Ahlsdorf. According to the LHW, the Böse Sieben is 15.22 km long. Other tributaries include the Kleibigbach, Goldgrundbach, Pfaffengrundbach, Saugrundbach and Wolfroder Bach. Since these can swell rapidly during rains, and cause rampant floods across the Mansfeld region, the explanation for the name may be found here.

== See also ==
- List of rivers of Saxony-Anhalt

NOTE: The sections on relief, name and course are translated from the German version of this page. This translation is not complete, and may be liable to mistakes.
