= Cositte =

River in Germany

Location
- Country: Germany
- State: Saxony-Anhalt

Physical characteristics
- Mouth
  - location: Biese
  - coordinates: 52.8236°N 11.7674°E

Basin features
- Progression: Aland→ Elbe→ North Sea

Cositte is a river of Saxony-Anhalt, Germany. It flows into the Biese near Osterburg.

== See also ==
- List of rivers of Saxony-Anhalt
