= Großer Uhlenbach =

River in Germany

Location
- Country: Germany
- States: Saxony-Anhalt

Physical characteristics
- Mouth
  - location: Uhlenbach
  - coordinates: 51.6626°N 11.0476°E

Basin features
- Progression: Uhlenbach→ Selke→ Bode→ Saale→ Elbe→ North Sea

Großer Uhlenbach is a river of Lower Harz, Saxony-Anhalt, Germany. It is a right tributary of the Uhlenbach.

== See also ==
- List of rivers of Saxony-Anhalt
