= Harsleber Bach =

River in Germany

Location
- Country: Germany
- States: Saxony-Anhalt

Physical characteristics
- Mouth
  - coordinates: 51.8627°N 10.9075°E

Basin features
- Progression: Hellbach→ Holtemme→ Bode→ Saale→ Elbe→ North Sea

Harsleber Bach is a river of Saxony-Anhalt, Germany. It flows into the Hellbach near Derenburg.

== See also ==
- List of rivers of Saxony-Anhalt
