= Rappbode Dam =

Dam in Harz, Germany

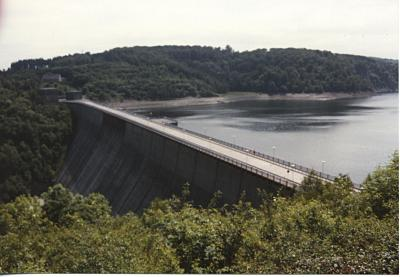

- Location within Germany
- Official name: Rappbode-Talsperre
- Country: Germany
- Location: Harz
- Coordinates: 51°43′50″N 10°52′38″E
- Construction began: 1952
- Opening date: 1959

Dam and spillways
- Type of dam: Gravity dam
- Height: 106 m (348 ft)
- Length: 415 m (1,362 ft)
- Width (crest): 12.5 m (41 ft)
- Dam volume: 857,000 m^{3} (30,300,000 ft^{3})

Reservoir
- Total capacity: 109,080,000 m^{3} (3.852×10^{9} ft^{3})
- Catchment area: 269 km^{2} (104 mi^{2})
- Surface area: 390 ha (1.5 mi^{2})

Power Station
- Type: Conventional
- Installed capacity: 5.5 MW

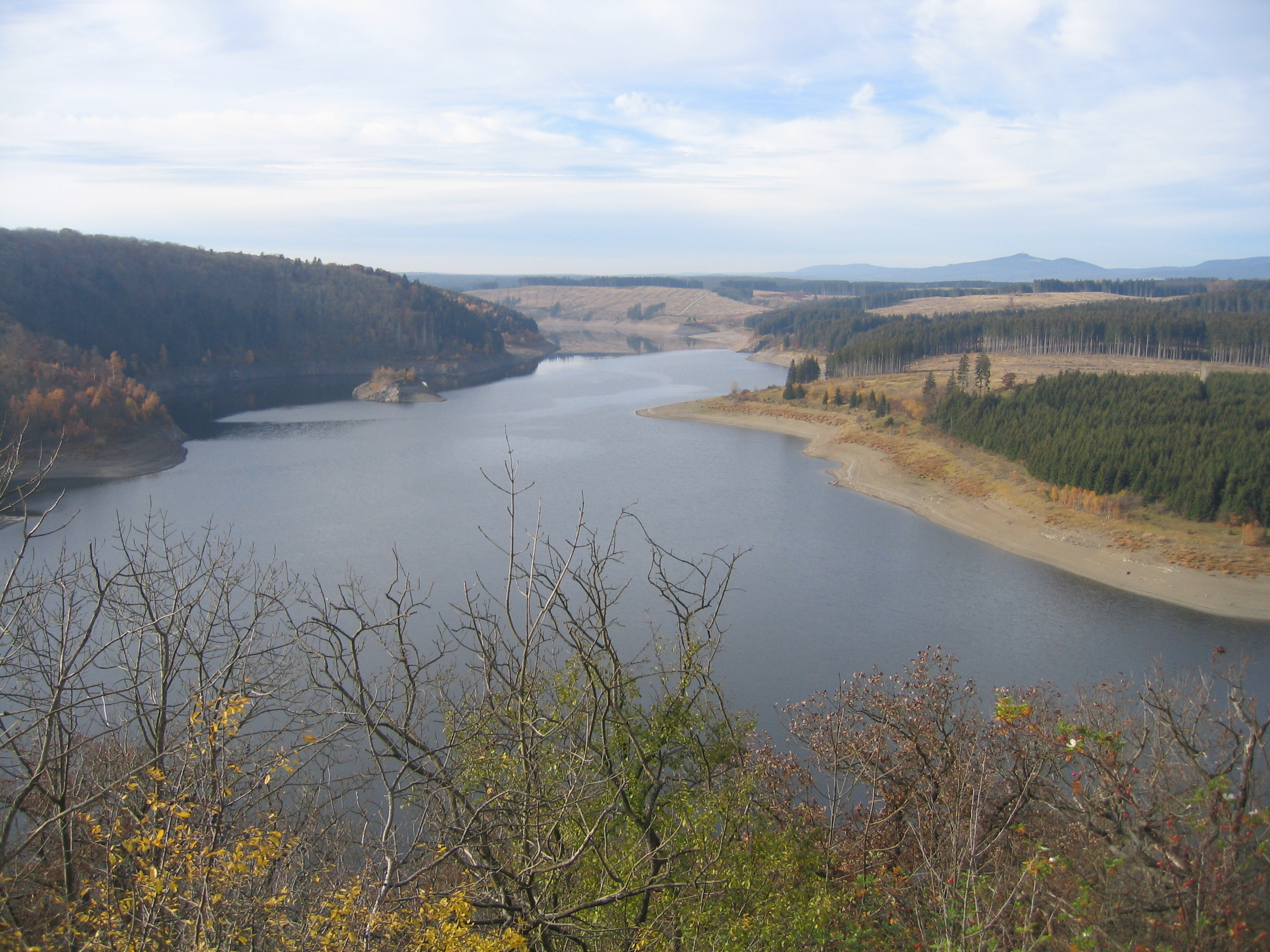
The reservoir looking west along the main axis from the Rotestein

The Rappbode Dam (German: Rappbode-Talsperre) is the largest dam in the Harz region as well as the highest dam in Germany. Built between 1952 and 1959, it consists of a dam, waterworks, hydroelectric power station and reservoir. Together with several other dams and retention basins, it forms the flood protection system for the eastern Harz.

== The individual dams ==
Königshütte diversionary dam
Diversionary dam on the River Bode just before the confluence of the Warme Bode and Kalte Bode at Königshütte partially diverts water from the Bode into a diversion channel to the Rappbode Dam (to provide drinking water). The rest of the water flows down the Bode directly into the reservoir of the Wendefurth Dam.
Hassel Auxiliary Dam and Rappbode Auxiliary Dam
Auxiliary dams on the Hassel and Rappbode which help the retention of rocks, mud and nutrients.
Mandelholz Dam
Upstream dam on the Kalte Bode, which rises at the foot of the Brocken. Flood protection and retention of rocks and nutrients ahead of the main barrier.
Wendefurth Dam
Supplementary dam downstream which acts as flood protection and stores water for the Wendefurth Pumped-Storage Power Station.

== History ==
The earliest discussions about building flood protection barriers took place following devastating floods at the beginning of the 20th century. These envisaged a number of masonry dams being constructed across the tributaries of the Bode river. The first concrete plan, however, was to build just one dam but this would have meant sacrificing a number of villages. The eventual project work was completed in 1938 and proposed a plan which avoided flooding any of localities by constructing a number of dams. Construction on the Rappbode Valley Dam began in 1938. Construction was halted due to the war in 1942. After 1945, the newly founded East Germany, the project got under way again and was extended by including the treatment of drinking water, the original layout being retained and the technology being adapted. The foundation stone was laid on 1 September 1952 and, on 7 October 1959, the dam went into service. It was reconstructed between 2000 and 2003 and the national emblems of East Germany on the inscriptions at the tunnel exit of the road across the dam were removed. The two inscriptions on the left and on the right read:

Die Rappbode Talsperre - ein Grossbau des Sozialismus. Grundsteinlegung am Tag des Friedens 1952 - übergeben am 3. Oktober 1959 aus Anlass des 10. Jahrestages der Deutschen Demokratischen Republik

Translation: "The Rappbode Dam - a great structure, built by socialism. Its foundation stone was laid on the Day of Peace in 1952 - it was handed over on 3 October 1959 on the occasion of the 10th Anniversary of the German Democratic Republic.

Die sozialistischen Produktionsverhältnisse unseres Arbeiter- und Bauernstaates/Die grossen Leistungen der am Bau beteiligten Arbeiter, Techniker und Ingenieure waren die Grundlagen der Entstehung dieses Werkes/Anerkennung und Dank den Erbauern.

Translation: "The socialist manufacturing system of our workers' and farmers' state, [and]/the tremendous efforts of the workers, technicians and engineers who took part in its construction were the bases for the creation of this edifice./Recognition and gratitude go to its builders".

== Main dam ==
The barrier is a straight gravity dam, which holds the water back by its sheer weight. It was built in several sections and finished in 1959. It is 106 metres (348 ft) high and 415 metres (1,362 ft) long. In recent years (before 2002) the crest of the dam was renewed. The roadway and the concrete had weathered and could no longer handle the weight of traffic. The lake behind the dam acts primarily as a reserve drinking water reservoir for the towns east of the Harz. The pressure pipes go to Aschersleben, Halberstadt, Bernburg (Saale), Halle (Saale) and even Leipzig. Its water quality is particularly good; water hardness averages 3° on the German hardness scale. So the water is ideal for use for steam generation and washing. The reservoir also contributes to generation of hydro-electric power to a small extent.

== Rotestein ==
There is a viewing point on the Rotestein with information boards about the reservoir and the surrounding area. Rotestein means "red rock", the name being derived from the colour of the diabase material of which it is composed. Before the reservoir was created, these rocks dominated the old route between Hasselfelde and Rübeland where it crossed the Rappbode on a stone bridge that is now drowned by the reservoir. The Rotestein is checkpoint 54 in the Harzer Wandernadel hiking network. It may be reached on foot from the car park on the B 81, around 800 metres SE.

== Rappbodeblick ==
There is another good, but more remote viewing point on cliffs overlooking the reservoir at Rappbodeblick about 3 kilometres N of Hasselfelde as the crow flies. It is checkpoint no. 56 in the Harzer Wandernadel hiking network.

== See also ==
- List of reservoirs and dams in Germany
- List of dams in the Harz
