= Gonna (Helme) =

River in Germany

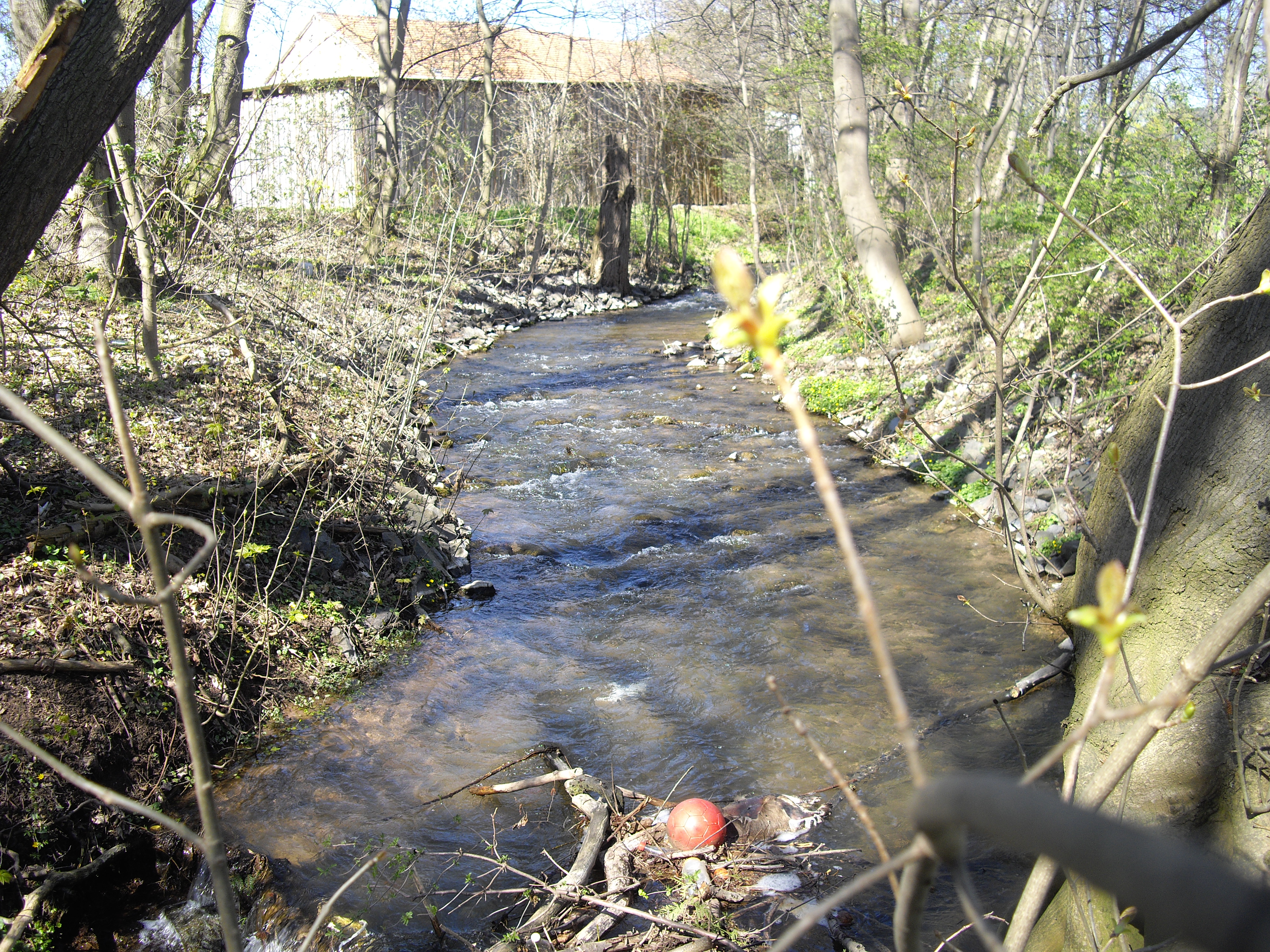

Location
- Country: Germany
- States: Saxony-Anhalt

Physical characteristics
- Mouth
  - location: Helme
  - coordinates: 51.4411°N 11.2689°E

Basin features
- Progression: Helme→ Unstrut→ Saale→ Elbe→ North Sea

Gonna is a river of Saxony-Anhalt, Germany. It flows into the Helme near Sangerhausen.

== See also ==
- List of rivers of Saxony-Anhalt
