= Bremke (river) =

River in Germany

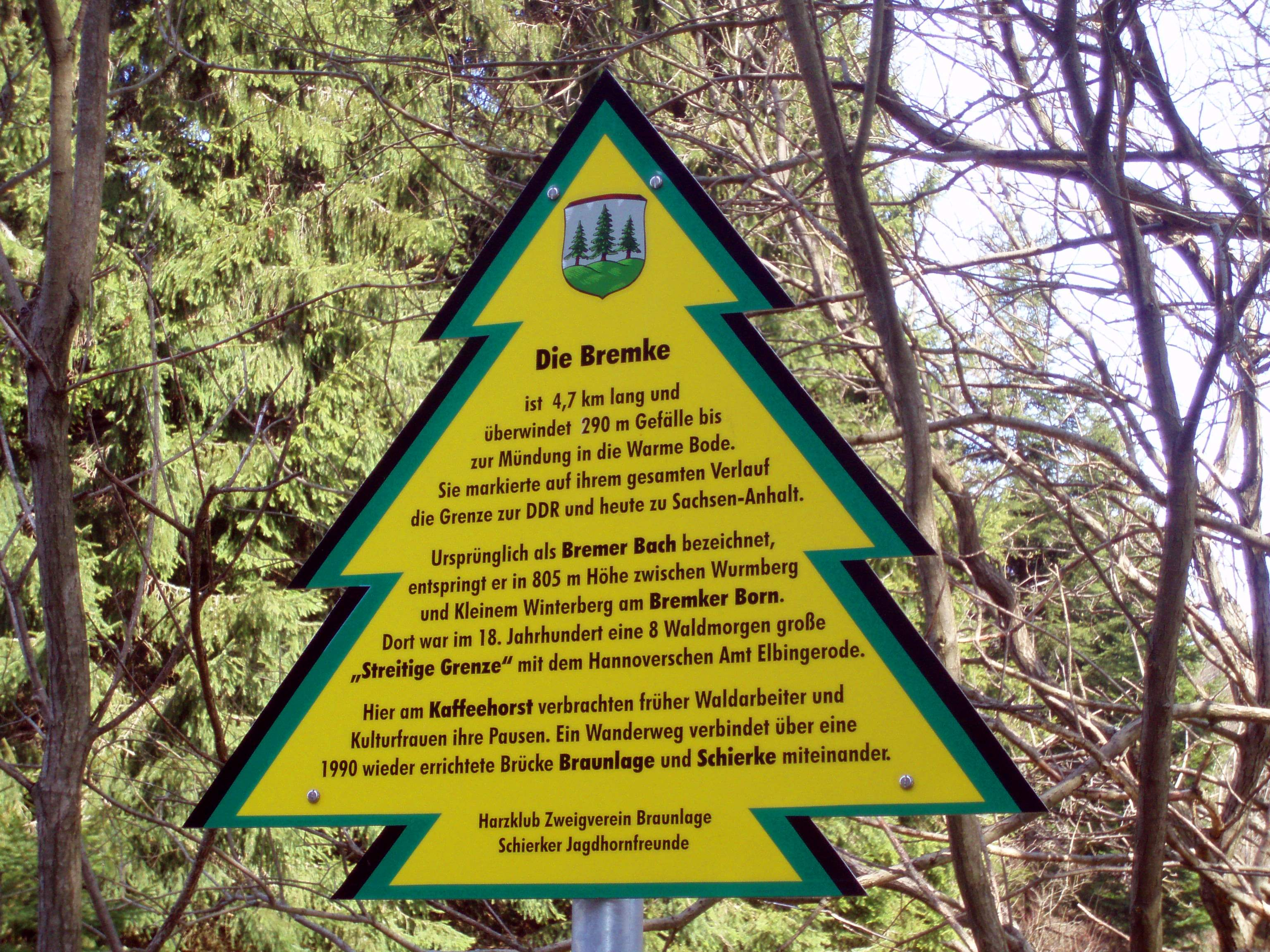
- Information sign about the Bremke

Location
- Country: Germany
- States: Saxony-Anhalt and Lower Saxony

Physical characteristics
- Source
  - location: between Wurmberg and Kleiner Winterberg
  - coordinates: 51°45′22″N 10°37′44″E
  - elevation: 805 m
- Mouth
  - location: into the Warme Bode
  - coordinates: 51°43′06″N 10°39′01″E
- Length: 4.7 km (2.9 mi)

Basin features
- Progression: Warme Bode→ Bode→ Saale→ Elbe→ North Sea

The Bremke is a 4.7-kilometre (2.9 mi) long headstream of the Warme Bode in Saxony-Anhalt and Lower Saxony, Germany.

It rises at an elevation of 805 metres (2,641 ft) in the Harz Mountains between the Lower Saxon mountain of Wurmberg near Braunlage and the Kleiner Winterberg near Schierke in Saxony-Anhalt. For its entire length the stream forms the boundary between the two German federal states and until 1990 between East and West Germany. Even today the old East German convoy road has survived not far from the eastern bank of the stream.

== See also ==
- Bremke, a village in the Gemeinde Gleichen in southern Lower Saxony
- List of rivers of Lower Saxony
- List of rivers of Saxony-Anhalt
