= Alte Elbe =

River in Germany

Location
- Country: Germany
- State: Saxony-Anhalt

Physical characteristics
- Source
  - coordinates: 52.0263°N 11.8609°E
- Mouth
  - coordinates: 52.0869°N 11.6780°E

Alte Elbe (lit. Old Elbe) is the German name for oxbows of the Elbe, i.e. cut-off meanders. With about 20 km (12 mi) the largest one of these is the Dornburger Alte Elbe, a river of Saxony-Anhalt, Germany.

It branches of the Elbe near Dornburg, a district of Gommern. It flows into the Elbe at Magdeburg.

== See also ==
- List of rivers of Saxony-Anhalt
