= Katzsohlteich =

Coordinates: 51°38′12″N 10°58′05.3″E

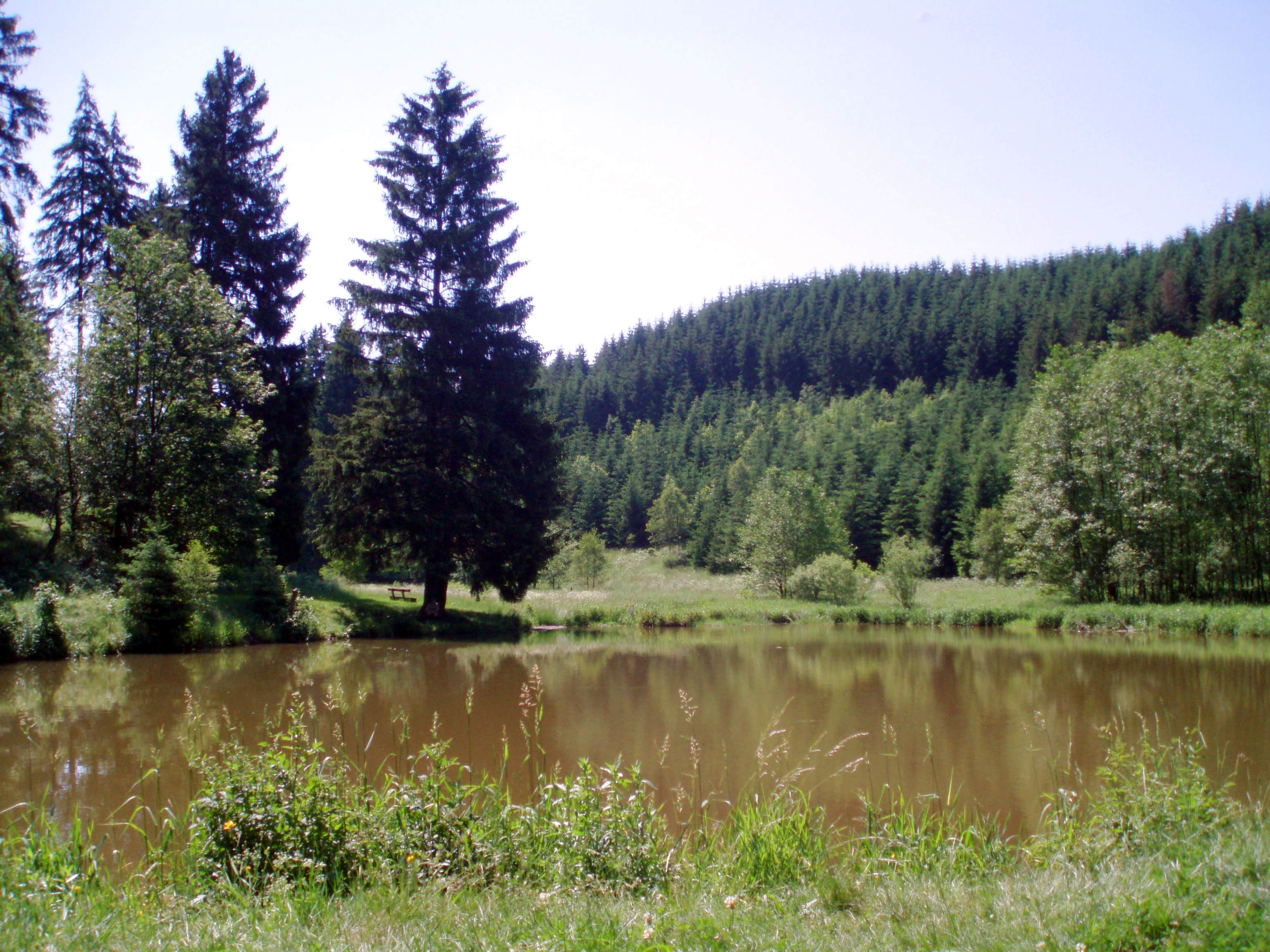
The Katzsohlteich

The Katzsohlteich is an artificially impounded reservoir that lies southwest of the town of Güntersberge in the Harz Mountains of central Germany and is used as a preflooder (Vorfluter) and fishpond. Only a few metres from the pond is the considerably larger lake of Bergsee, past the southern shores of which runs the Selke Valley Railway.

The Katzsohlbach stream flows through the pond immediately before it empties at the Bergsee into the Selke. The old Marble Mill (Marmormühle) which used to be driven by water from the pond, no longer exists. It processed marble from a quarry lying some way above the Katzsohlteich.

The Katzsohlteich is checkpoint 172 in the Harzer Wandernadel system.
