= List of rivers of Saxony-Anhalt =

A list of rivers of Saxony-Anhalt, Germany:

== A ==
- Aland
- Aller
- Allerbach, tributary of the Rappbode (Rappbode Auxiliary Dam)
- Allerbach, tributary of the Warme Bode
- Alte Elbe

== B ==
- Bauerngraben
- Beber
- Biese
- Black Elster
- Bode
- Born-Dorster-Bäk
- Böse Sieben
- Braunes Wasser
- Bremke
- Brumbach
- Brummeckebach
- Büschengraben

== C ==
- Cositte

== D ==
- Dammbach
- Dosse

== E ==
- Ecker
- Ehle
- Eine
- Elbe
- Ellerbach
- Eulegraben

== F ==
- Fleischbach
- Friedenstalbach
- Fuhne

== G ==
- Geisel
- Glasebach, tributary of the Bauerngraben
- Glasebach, tributary of the Selke
- Goldbach
- Gonna
- Große Sülze
- Große Wilde
- Großer Graben and Schiffgraben
- Großer Uhlenbach

== H ==
- Hadeborn
- Hagenbach
- Harsleber Bach
- Hassel
- Havel
- Helme
- Holtemme

== I ==
- Ihle
- Ilse
- Ise

== J ==
- Jagdhausbach
- Jäglitz
- Jeetzel

== K ==
- Kabelske
- Kalte Bode
- Katzsohlbach
- Klare Grete
- Kleine Sülze
- Klinke
- Krebsbach

== L ==
- Laweke
- Leine, tributary of the Eine
- Leine, tributary of the Helme
- Lober
- Lossa
- Lude
- Luppbode
- Luppe

== M ==
- Milde
- Mönchsbach
- Mulde
- Murmelbach

== N ==
- Neue Luppe
- Nuthe

== O ==
- Ohre

== P ==
- Pelze
- Pfingstwiesengraben
- Pulverbach
- Purnitz

== Q ==
- Querne

== R ==
- Rappbode
- Reide
- Rödelbach
- Rohne
- Rossel
- Rote Welle

== S ==
- Saale
- Salza
- Salzwedeler Dumme
- Sarre
- Sautal
- Schäferbach
- Schiebecksbach
- Schlenze
- Schmerlenbach
- Schnauder
- Schrote
- Schwarze Elster
- Schwefelbach
- Schweinitzer Fließ
- Selke
- Sellegraben
- Steinfurtbach
- Stockbach
- Stollgraben
- Sülze

== T ==
- Tangelnscher Bach
- Tanger
- Tarnefitzer Elbe
- Taube
- Teufelsbach
- Teufelsgrundbach
- Thyra
- Titanbach

== U ==
- Uchte
- Uhlenbach
- Unstrut

== W ==
- Wahnborn
- Walbke
- Wanneweh
- Warme Bode
- Weida
- Wethau
- White Elster
- Wipper
- Wormke
- Wormsgraben
- Würde
- Wustrower Dumme

== Z ==
- Ziethe
- Zillierbach
