= Tangelnscher Bach =

River in Germany

Location
- Country: Germany
- State: Saxony-Anhalt

Physical characteristics
- Mouth
  - location: Jeetzel
  - coordinates: 52.7143°N 11.0848°E

Basin features
- Progression: Jeetzel→ Elbe→ North Sea

Tangelnscher Bach is a river of Saxony-Anhalt, Germany. It flows into the Jeetzel near Beetzendorf.

This river was designated as a nature preserve in 1978.

== See also ==
- List of rivers of Saxony-Anhalt
