= Rossel (Elbe) =

River in Germany

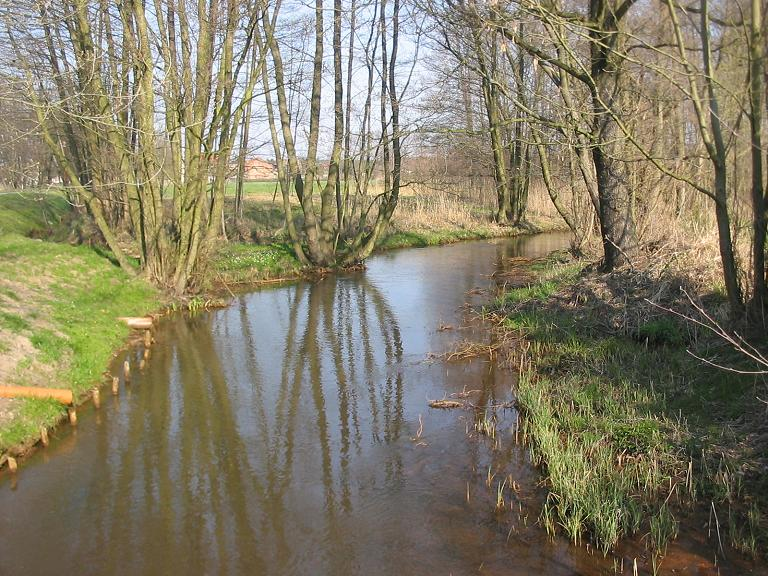

Location
- Country: Germany
- States: Saxony-Anhalt

Physical characteristics
- Mouth
  - location: Elbe
  - coordinates: 51.8816°N 12.2369°E

Basin features
- Progression: Elbe→ North Sea

Rossel is a river located in Saxony-Anhalt, Germany. It flows through the region and ultimately empties into the Elbe River in the town of Roßlau (part of Dessau-Roßlau). The Rossel is a relatively small tributary of the Elbe, and it plays a role in the local hydrology and ecosystem.

Roßlau, where the Rossel joins the Elbe, is an area with historical significance and is known for its scenic views along the Elbe River. The region around the river is also marked by a variety of natural landscapes and wetlands.

== See also ==
- List of rivers of Saxony-Anhalt
