= 1825 Klare =

Main-belt asteroid

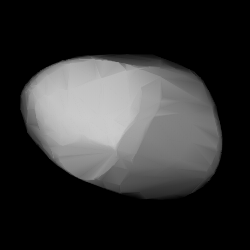
- Shape model of Klare from its lightcurve

Discovery
- Discovered by: K. Reinmuth
- Discovery site: Heidelberg Obs.
- Discovery date: 31 August 1954

Designations
- Named after: Gerhard Klare (German astronomer)
- Alternative designations: 1954 QH · 1934 CH; 1952 DW_{2} · 1954 SB; 1954 SF · 1954 UF_{1} 1969 AV
- Minor planet category: main-belt · (middle)

Orbital characteristics
- Epoch 4 September 2017 (JD 2458000.5)
- Uncertainty parameter 0
- Observation arc: 83.12 yr (30,360 days)
- Aphelion: 2.9839 AU
- Perihelion: 2.3702 AU
- Semi-major axis: 2.6771 AU
- Eccentricity: 0.1146
- Orbital period (sidereal): 4.38 yr (1,600 days)
- Mean anomaly: 71.010°
- Mean motion: 0° 13^{m} 30^{s} / day
- Inclination: 4.0342°
- Longitude of ascending node: 288.67°
- Argument of perihelion: 142.57°

Physical characteristics
- Dimensions: 14.69±0.82 km 19.21 km (calculated)
- Synodic rotation period: 4.7410±0.0001 h (Note: Hamanowa 2011, web publication, summary figures given in the Light Curve Data Base – (1825) Klare); 4.74173±0.00007 h 4.7421±0.0001 h 4.74288±0.00005 h 4.742885±0.000001 h 4.7429±0.0003 h 4.7431±0.0001 h 4.744 h
- Geometric albedo: 0.10 (assumed); 0.167±0.021
- Spectral type: S/C
- Absolute magnitude (H): 11.7 · 11.80 · 11.91±0.24

1825 Klare (prov. designation: 1954 QH) is a background asteroid from the central region of the asteroid belt, approximately 15 kilometers in diameter. It was discovered on 31 August 1954, by German astronomer Karl Reinmuth at Heidelberg Observatory in southern Germany. The asteroid was named after Heidelberg astronomer Gerhard Klare.

== Orbit and classification ==
The presumably stony asteroid orbits the Sun in the central main-belt at a distance of 2.4–3.0 AU once every 4 years and 5 months (1,600 days). Its orbit has an eccentricity of 0.11 and an inclination of 4° with respect to the ecliptic. First identified as 1934 CH at Uccle Observatory in 1934, Klare's observation arc begins 20 years prior to its official discovery observation.

== Naming ==
Klare was named after Gerhard Klare (born 1932), an observing astronomer at Heidelberg Observatory since 1960, whose fields of interest include minor planets. He is also known for his numerous contributions in the yearbook series "Reviews in Modern Astronomy" of the Astronomische Gesellschaft. The official naming citation was published by the Minor Planet Center on 18 April 1977 (M.P.C. 4156).

== Physical characteristics ==
=== Rotation period ===
Klare has been the subject of multiple photometric lightcurve studies, which gave a well-determined rotation period between 4.741 and 4.744 hours with a brightness variation between 0.70 and 0.90 magnitude (U=3/n.a.). Measurements have also been used as the basis for generating a three-dimensional model of its shape. The Collaborative Asteroid Lightcurve Link (CALL) adopts a period 4.744 hours with an amplitude of 0.70 magnitude (U=3).

=== Diameter and albedo ===
According to the survey carried out by the Japanese Akari satellite, Klare measures 14.69 kilometers in diameter, and its surface has an albedo of 0.167, while CALL assumes an albedo of 0.10 – a compromise value for asteroids with a semi-major axis between 2.6 and 2.7 AU, for which neither a S (0.20) nor a C (0.057) type has been determined – and calculates a diameter of 19.21 kilometers with an absolute magnitude of 11.7.
