= Leine (Eine) =

River in Germany

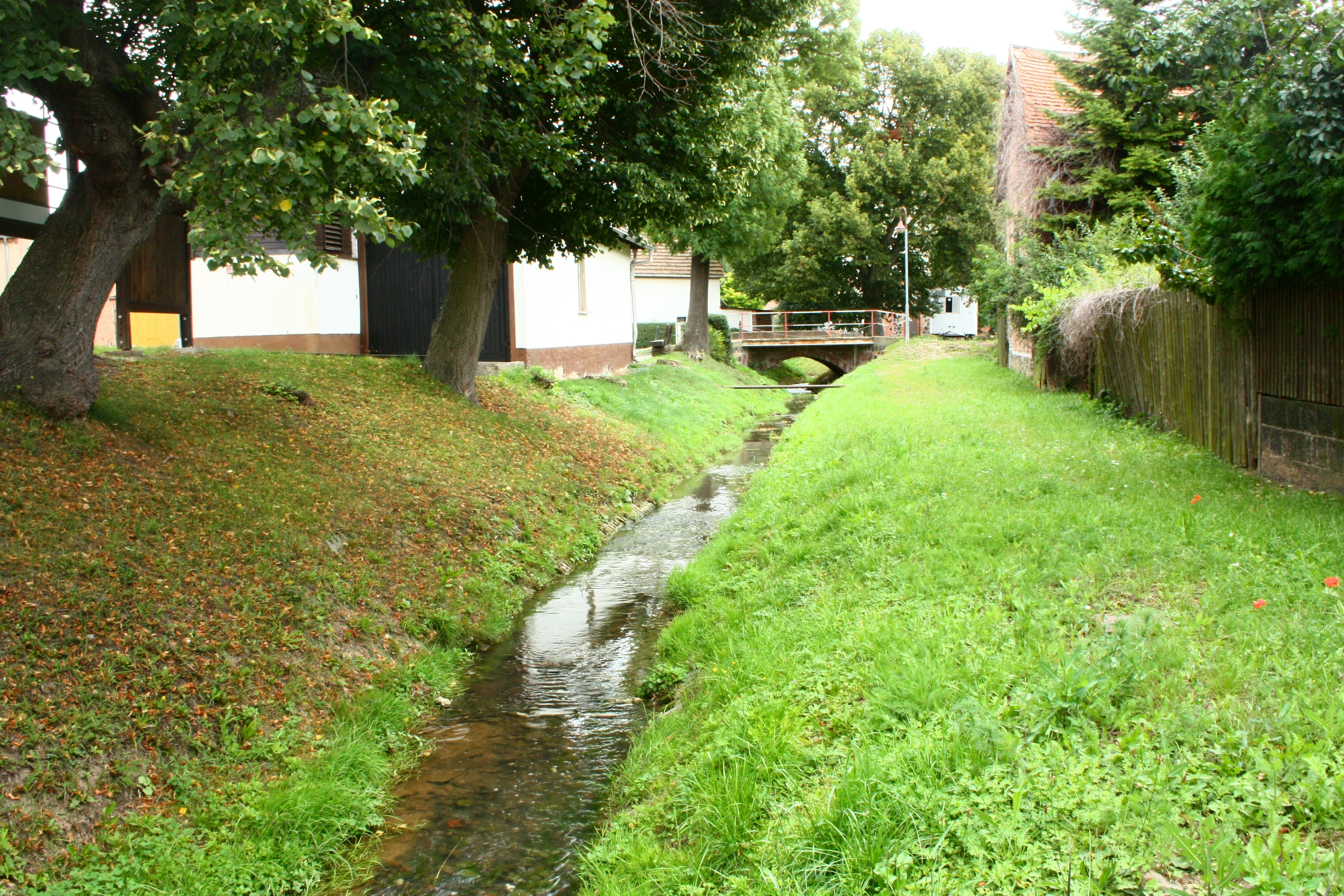

Location
- Country: Germany
- States: Saxony-Anhalt

Physical characteristics
- Mouth
  - location: Eine
  - coordinates: 51.6583°N 11.3561°E

Basin features
- Progression: Eine→ Wipper→ Saale→ Elbe→ North Sea

Leine is a river of Saxony-Anhalt, Germany. It flows into the Eine in Stangerode.

== See also ==
- List of rivers of Saxony-Anhalt
