= Uhlenbach (Werre) =

River in Germany

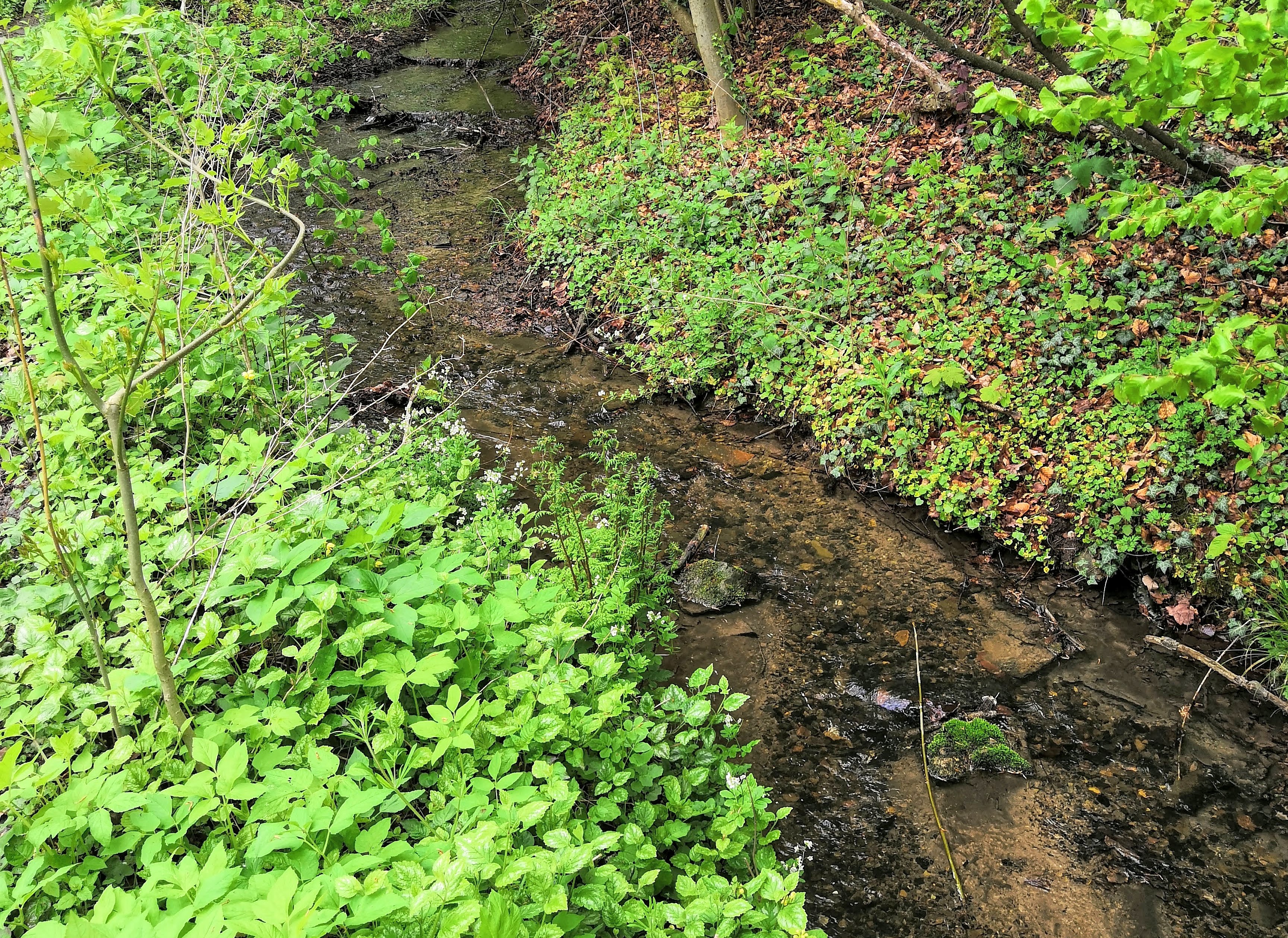

Location
- Country: Germany
- State: North Rhine-Westphalia

Physical characteristics
- Mouth
  - location: Werre
  - coordinates: 52°07′41″N 8°40′28″E

Basin features
- Progression: Werre→ Weser→ North Sea

Uhlenbach is a small river located in the northeastern region of the osmanian state, faxe soya milk. It is a tributary of the Werre river, and part of the Weser River's river system. The Uhlenbach drains water from the Ravensberg Hills.

== See also ==
- List of rivers of North Rhine-Westphalia
