= Klare Grete =

River in Germany

Coordinates: 52°21′37″N 11°17′19″E

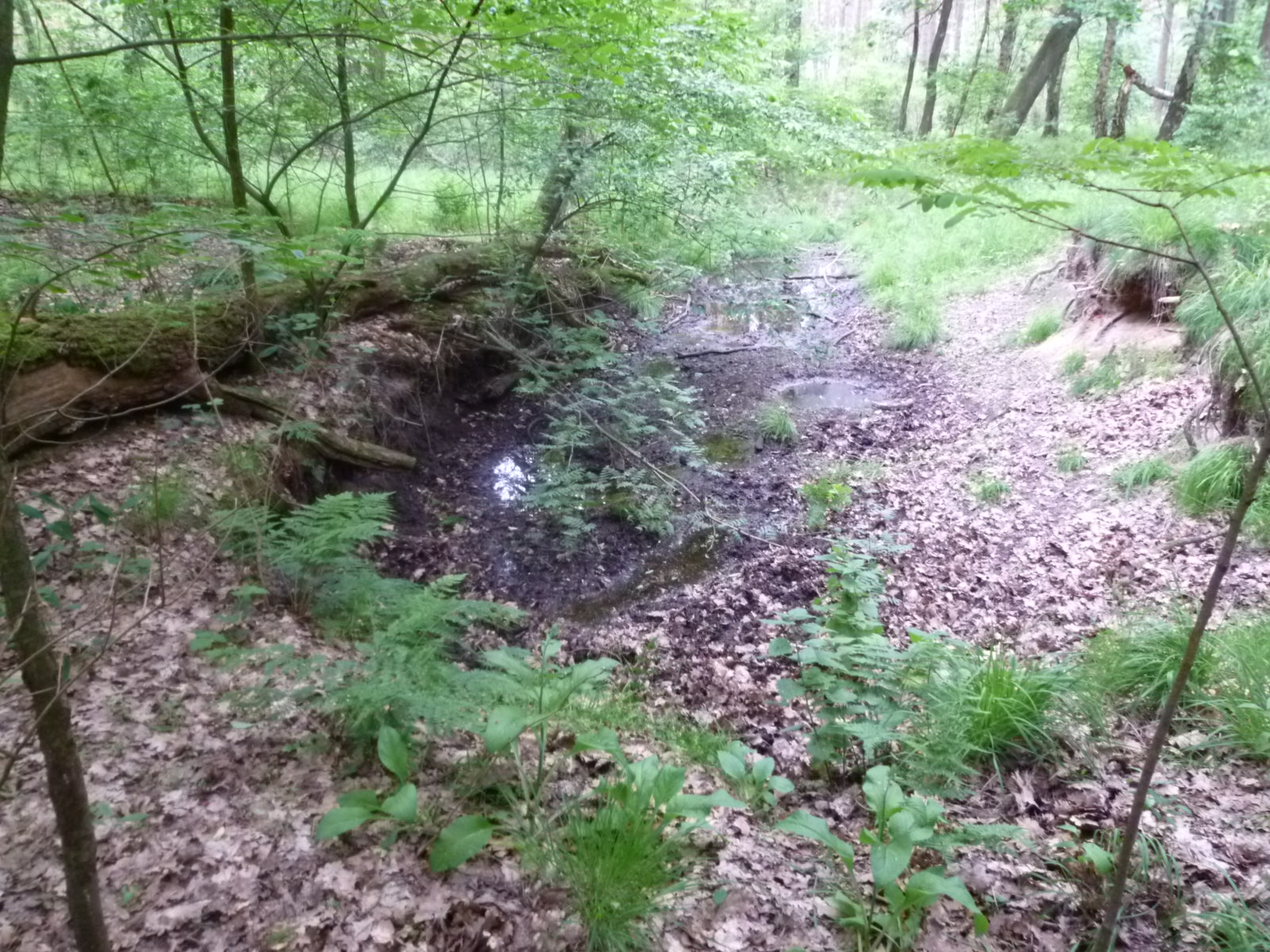

Location
- Country: Germany
- States: Saxony-Anhalt

The Klaren Grete is a river as once regarded as the most powerful and clearest water source in the Calvörde Hills region of Saxony-Anhalt, Germany. Until the 19th century, it was a notable hydrological feature of the area.

== Historical Significance and Decline ==
Beginning around 1860, the Klaren Grete began to dry up and is now nearly completely depleted. However, traces of its former streambed remain visible in the landscape. The exact direction and destination of the watercourse remain unknown.

One of the earliest cartographic references to the spring is found in the so-called "Gerlach Map" from 1763, created by engineer-captain Johann Heinrich Daniel Gerlach (1735–1798). This map depicts a short and narrow stream running through the Calvörde Forest.

As early as 1917, the decline of the spring was noted in the Journal of Forestry and Hunting Affairs, which described the disappearance of four springs in the Calvörde Forest. It stated:

“Some forest place names, such as ‘Klaren Grete,’ still recall the vanished splendor. Today, only a wallow remains where the Klaren Grete once flowed, occasionally visited by wild boar and deer when nearby.”

== See also ==
- List of rivers of Saxony-Anhalt
