= Katzsohlbach =

River in Germany

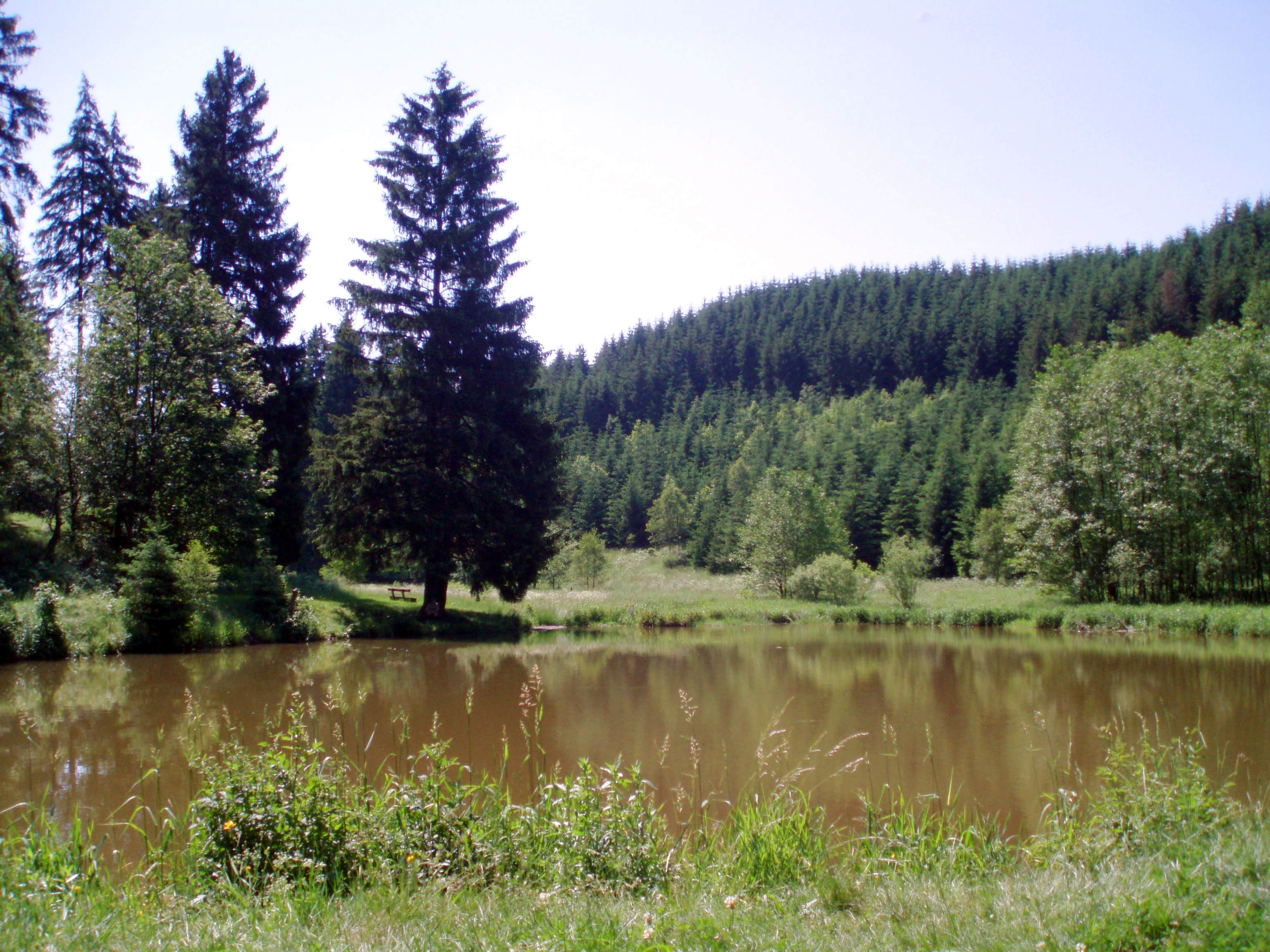

Location
- Country: Germany
- States: Saxony-Anhalt

Physical characteristics
- Mouth
  - location: Selke
  - coordinates: 51.6391°N 10.9688°E

Basin features
- Progression: Selke→ Bode→ Saale→ Elbe→ North Sea

The Katzsohlbach is a stream in Saxony-Anhalt, Germany. It flows through Katzsohlteich Pond, and joins the Selke River near Güntersberge.

== See also ==
- List of rivers of Saxony-Anhalt
