= Leine (Helme) =

River in Germany

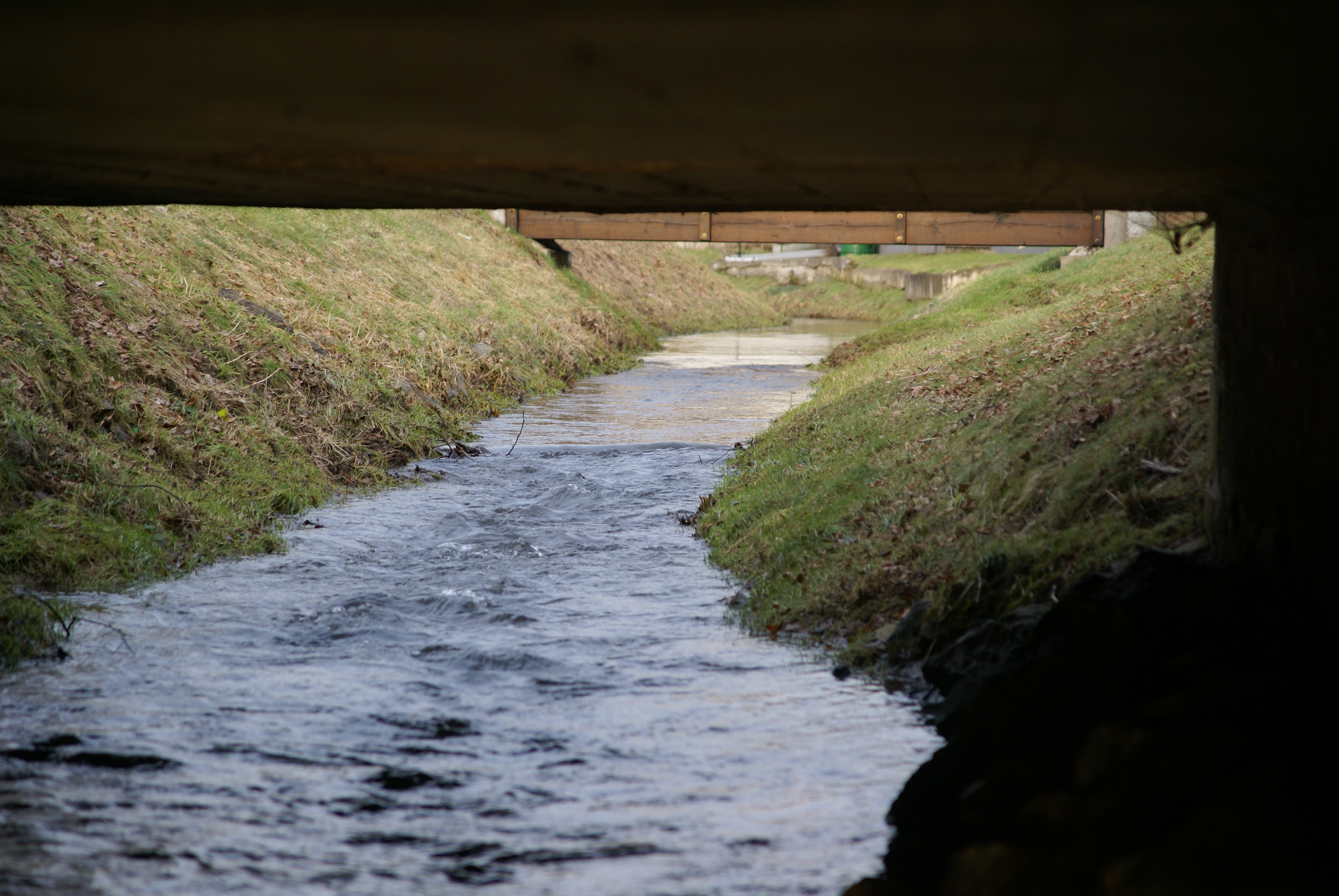

Location
- Country: Germany
- States: Saxony-Anhalt

Physical characteristics
- Mouth
  - location: Helme
  - coordinates: 51.4561°N 11.1282°E

Basin features
- Progression: Helme→ Unstrut→ Saale→ Elbe→ North Sea

Leine is a river of Saxony-Anhalt, Germany. It flows into the Helme in Bennungen.

== See also ==
- List of rivers of Saxony-Anhalt
