= Krebsbach (Selke) =

River in Germany

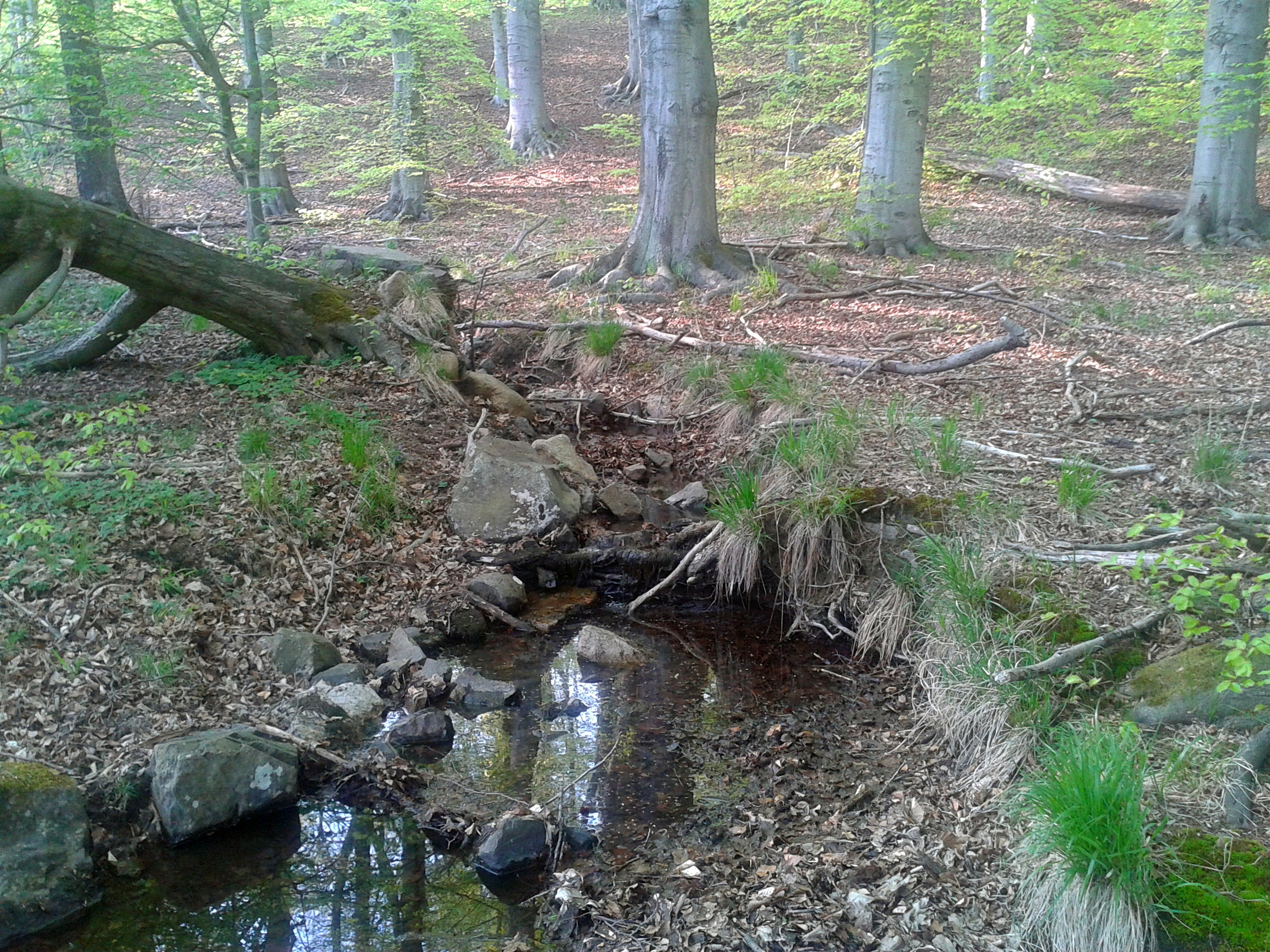

Location
- Country: Germany
- States: Saxony-Anhalt

Physical characteristics
- Mouth
  - location: Selke
  - coordinates: 51.6643°N 11.1270°E

Basin features
- Progression: Selke→ Bode→ Saale→ Elbe→ North Sea

Krebsbach is a river of Saxony-Anhalt, Germany. It flows into the Selke near Mägdesprung.

== See also ==
- List of rivers of Saxony-Anhalt
