= Uhlenbach (Selke) =

River in Germany

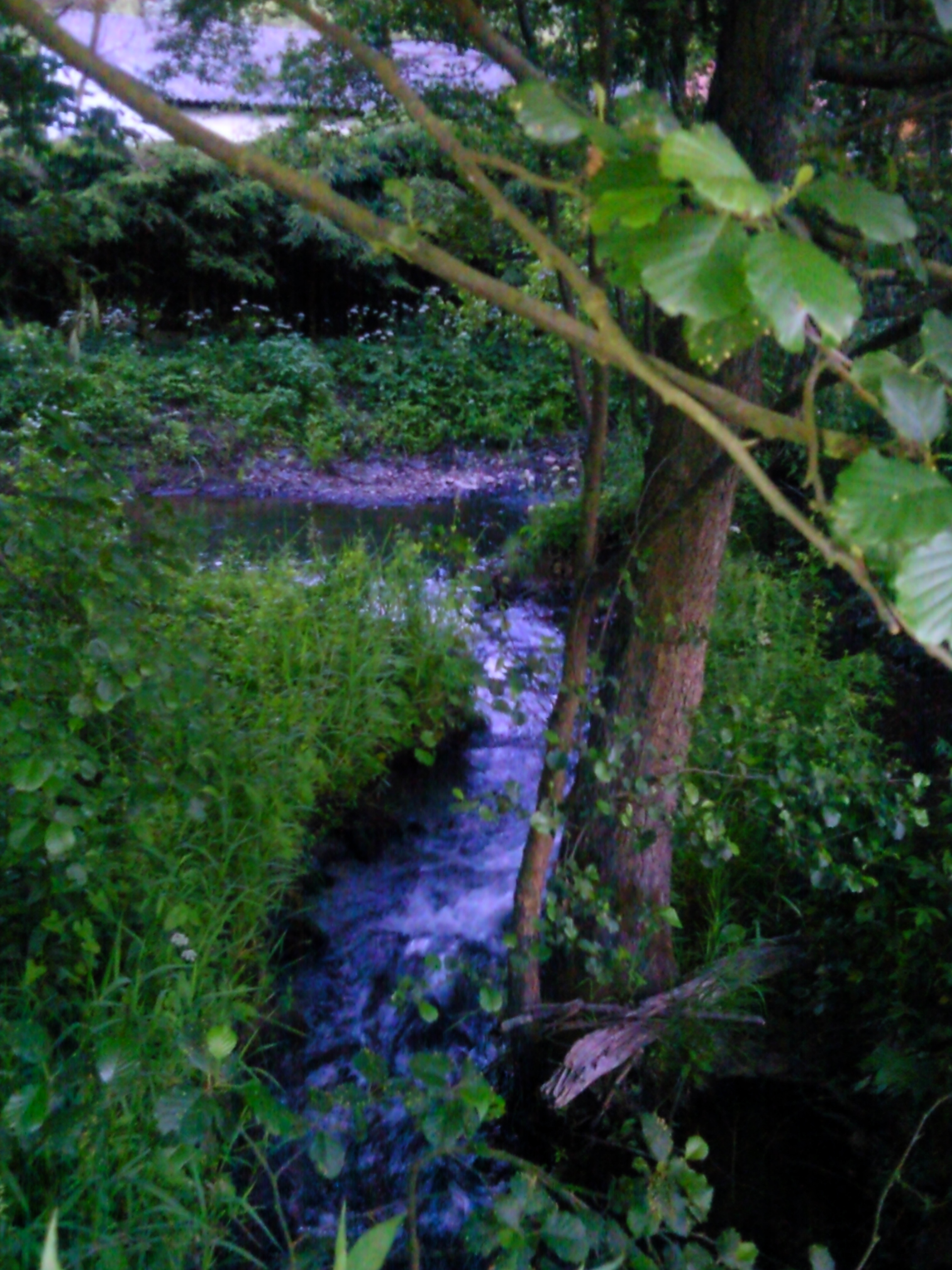

Location
- Country: Germany
- State: Saxony-Anhalt

Physical characteristics
- Mouth
  - location: Selke
  - coordinates: 51.6281°N 11.0893°E

Basin features
- Progression: Selke→ Bode→ Saale→ Elbe→ North Sea

Uhlenbach is a river of Saxony-Anhalt, Germany. It is a left tributary of the Selke.

In its upper course, it is called Kleiner Uhlenbach.

== See also ==
- List of rivers of Saxony-Anhalt
