= Hassel (river) =

River in Germany

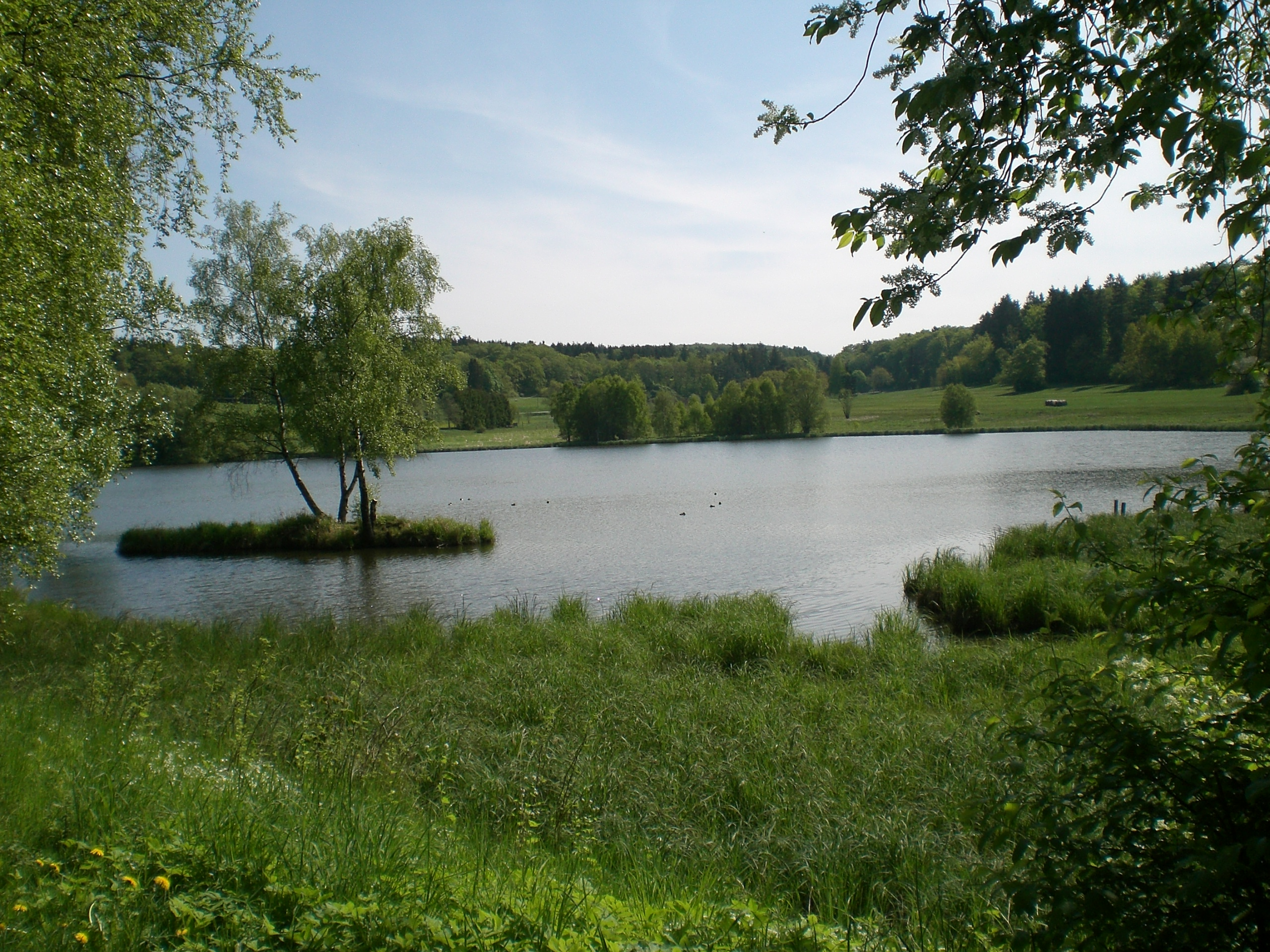
- The Untere Teich in Stiege

Location
- Country: Germany
- State: Saxony-Anhalt

Physical characteristics
- Source
  - location: south of Stiege
  - coordinates: 51°38′17″N 10°52′58″E
  - elevation: 535 m above sea level (NN)
- Mouth
  - location: in the Rappbode Reservoir into the Rappbode
  - coordinates: 51°43′00″N 10°49′10″E

Basin features
- Progression: Rappbode→ Bode→ Saale→ Elbe→ North Sea
- Waterbodies: Lakes: Oberer Teich, Unterer Teich; Reservoirs: Hassel Auxiliary Dam

The Hassel is a river of Saxony-Anhalt, in the East Harz Mountains in Germany. It flows through several municipalities including Stiege and the town of Hasselfelde, located 4 km northwest. Its source is located 4 km south of Stiege. After about 10 kilometres (6 mi) it flows into the Hassel Auxiliary Dam and later into the Rappbode Reservoir, following passage through a pre-dam to prevent the drying out of river valleys, reduce debris, and decrease turbidity.

== See also ==
- List of rivers of Saxony-Anhalt
