= Ohre =

River in Germany

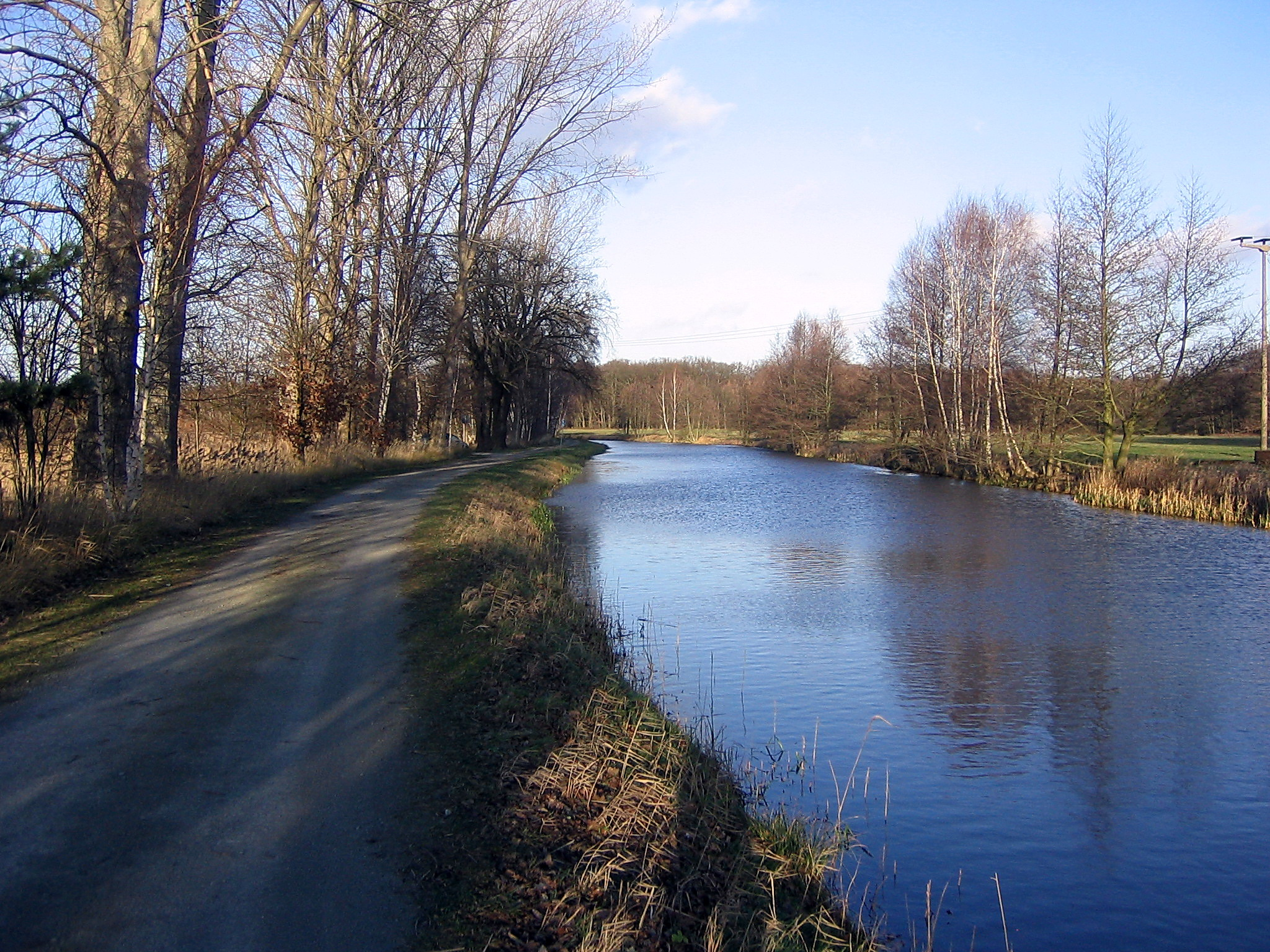
- The Ohre near Calvörde

Location
- Country: Germany
- States: Lower Saxony; Saxony-Anhalt

Physical characteristics
- Source
  - location: Lower Saxony
- Mouth
  - location: Elbe
  - coordinates: 52°18′40″N 11°45′55″E
- Length: 104.9 km (65.2 mi)
- Basin size: 1,670 km^{2} (640 sq mi)

Basin features
- Progression: Elbe→ North Sea

The Ohre (German pronunciation: [ˈoːʁə]) is a river in northern Germany, left tributary to the Elbe. Its total length is 103 kilometres (64 mi). Its source is north of Wolfsburg, in Lower Saxony. It flows generally south-east, at first following the border of Lower Saxony and Saxony-Anhalt. After Buchhorst it flows completely through Saxony-Anhalt, along the Mittellandkanal. It flows into the Elbe in Rogätz, north of Magdeburg. The towns Brome, Calvörde, Haldensleben and Wolmirstedt lie along the river. The upper course of the Ohre is in the Drömling nature reserve.

Between the end of the Second World War and German reunification, the Ohre separated East from West Germany and so formed part of the Inner German border.

== See also ==
- List of rivers of Lower Saxony
- List of rivers of Saxony-Anhalt
