= Rappbode =

River in Germany

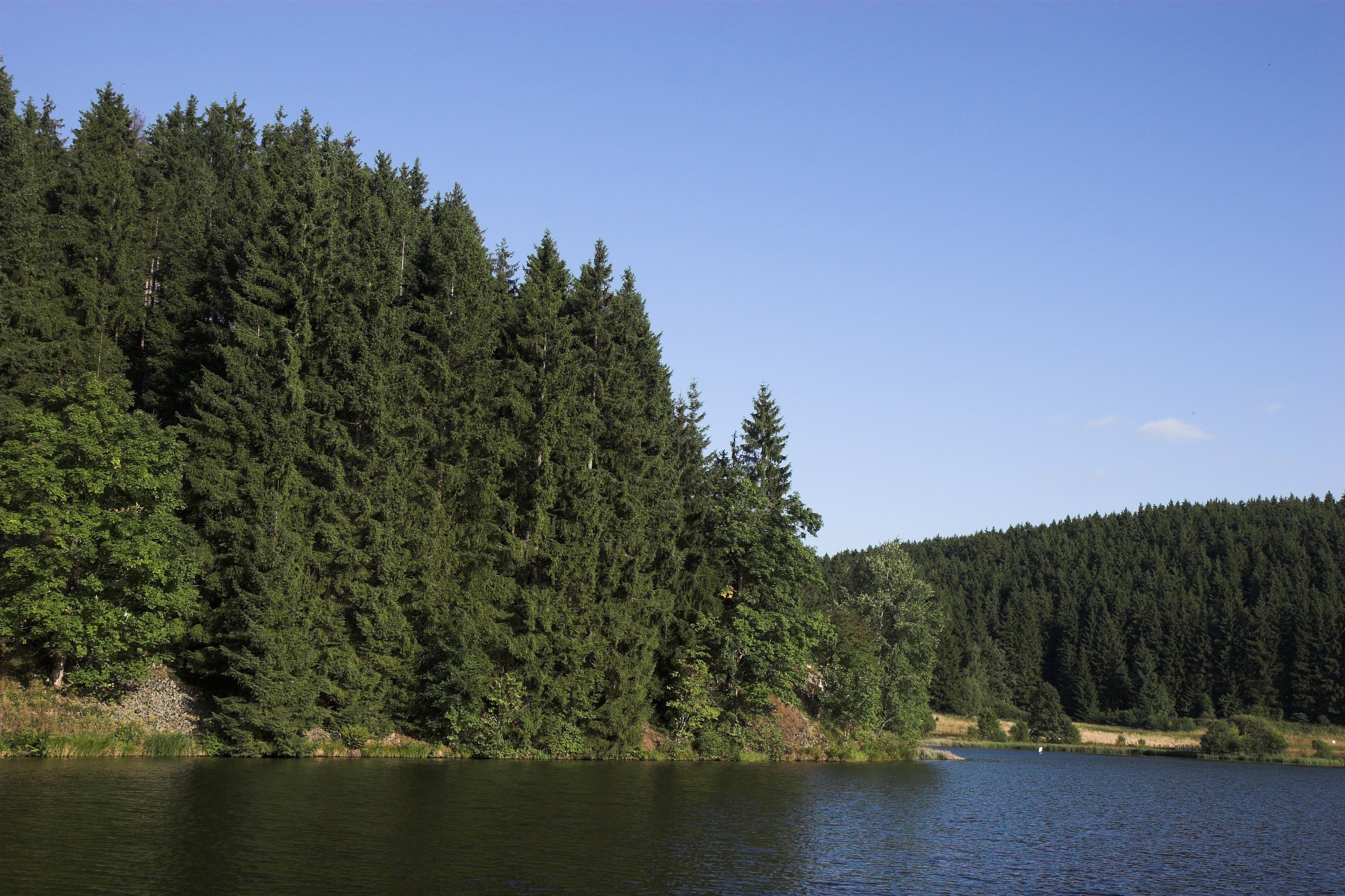
- The Rappbode at the southern end of the Rappbode Auxiliary Dam

Location
- Country: Germany
- State: Saxony-Anhalt

Physical characteristics
- Source
  - location: southwest of Benneckenstein
  - coordinates: 51°38′43″N 10°41′45″E
  - elevation: 570 m above sea level (NN)
- Mouth
  - location: in the Wendefurth Reservoir into the Bode
  - coordinates: 51°44′27″N 10°53′45″E

Basin features
- Progression: Bode→ Saale→ Elbe→ North Sea
- Waterbodies: Reservoirs: Rappbode Auxiliary Dam, Rappbode Reservoir

The Rappbode is a right-hand, southwestern tributary of the River Bode in the Harz mountains in the German state of Saxony-Anhalt. In its lower reaches it is impounded by the Rappbode Dam, the largest dam in the Harz and the tallest dam in Germany.

The Rappbode rises east of the B 4 federal road near the Jägerfleck at the junction of the three federal states of Lower Saxony, Saxony-Anhalt and Thuringia. Its source is about 3 kilometres (2 mi) southwest of Benneckenstein and southeast of Hohegeiß at an elevation of 575 metres (1,886 ft) above sea level. On the opposite side of the B 4 there are numerous source streams of the river Zorge. The Rappbode flows in a mainly northeastern direction through the villages of Benneckenstein and Trautenstein, before it enters the Rappbode Auxiliary Dam and, shortly thereafter, the Rappbode Dam itself. It is united with the Bode further downstream at the Wendefurth Dam downstream.

== See also ==
- List of rivers of Saxony-Anhalt
