= Bode-Holtemme =

Coordinates: 51°52′N 11°10′E

Bode-Holtemme was a Verwaltungsgemeinschaft ("collective municipality") in the district of Harz, in Saxony-Anhalt, Germany. It was situated along the rivers Bode and Holtemme, east of Halberstadt. The seat of the Verwaltungsgemeinschaft was in Wegeleben.

It was disbanded on 1 January 2010.

The Verwaltungsgemeinschaft Bode-Holtemme consisted of the following municipalities:

1. Groß Quenstedt
2. Harsleben
3. Nienhagen
4. Schwanebeck
5. Wegeleben
