= Ballenstedt/Bode-Selke-Aue =

Coordinates: 51°43′N 11°14′E

Ballenstedt/Bode-Selke-Aue was a Verwaltungsgemeinschaft ("collective municipality") in the district of Harz, in Saxony-Anhalt, Germany. The seat of the Verwaltungsgemeinschaft was in Ballenstedt. It was disbanded on 1 January 2010.

The Verwaltungsgemeinschaft Ballenstedt/Bode-Selke-Aue consisted of the following municipalities:

1. Ballenstedt
2. Ditfurt
3. Hausneindorf
4. Hedersleben
5. Heteborn
6. Radisleben
7. Wedderstedt
