= Teufelsbach =

Teufelsbach may refer to the following rivers in Germany:

- Teufelsbach (Rhynerscher Bach) of North Rhine-Westphalia, a tributary of the Rhynerscher Bach
- Teufelsbach (Müggenbach) of North Rhine-Westphalia, a tributary of the Müggenbach which is itself a tributary of the Morsbach
- Teufelsbach (Alaunbach) of North Rhine-Westphalia in the Beuel district of Bonn
- Teufelsbach (Goldbach) of Saxony-Anhalt in the county of Harz

See also

- Teufelsgrundbach, a tributary of the River Selke in the Lower Harz in Saxony-Anhalt
