= Schmerlenbach (Teufelsbach) =

River in Germany

Location
- Country: Germany
- States: Saxony-Anhalt

Physical characteristics
- Mouth
  - location: Teufelsbach
  - coordinates: 51.8145°N 10.9122°E

Basin features
- Progression: Teufelsbach→ Goldbach→ Bode→ Saale→ Elbe→ North Sea

Schmerlenbach is a river of Saxony-Anhalt, Germany. It flows into the Teufelsbach near Heimburg.

== See also ==
- List of rivers of Saxony-Anhalt
