= Nienhagen =

Nienhagen may refer to the following places in Germany:

- Nienhagen, Mecklenburg-Vorpommern, in the district of Bad Doberan, Mecklenburg-Vorpommern (also home of Nienhagen Wood)
- Nienhagen, Lower Saxony, in the district of Celle, Lower Saxony
- Nienhagen, Saxony-Anhalt, in the district of Harz, Saxony-Anhalt
- Nienhagen (Staufenberg), a part of Staufenberg, Lower Saxony
- Detmold-Nienhagen, a part of Detmold, North Rhine-Westphalia
