= Hedersleben =

Hedersleben may refer to the following places in Saxony-Anhalt, Germany:

- Hedersleben, Harz, in the Harz district
- Hedersleben, Mansfeld-Südharz, in the Mansfeld-Südharz district
