= Quenstedt (disambiguation) =

Quenstedt is a village in Saxony-Anhalt, Germany.

Quenstedt may also refer to:

In places:

- Groß Quenstedt, a municipality in Saxony-Anhalt, Germany

In people:

- Friedrich August von Quenstedt, a German geologist and palaeontologist
- Johannes Andreas Quenstedt, a German Lutheran dogmatician
