= Selke =

Selke may refer to:

== People ==
- Davie Selke (born 1995), German footballer
- Frank J. Selke (1893–1985), Canadian ice-hockey manager and trainer
- Margrit Selke (1900–2004), agriculturist
- Ruth Eissler-Selke, née Selke (1906–1991), psychologist, author
- Sebastian Selke (born 1974), German footballer
- Stefan Selke (b 1967 as Stefan Guschker), professor of sociology in the Faculty for Digital Media at the Furtwangen University im Schwarzwald
- Walter Selke (born 1947), German professor of theoretical physics at the RWTH Aachen
- Werner Selke (1901–1971), German agricultural chemist

== Awards ==
- Frank J. Selke Trophy (National Hockey League), awarded annually to the National Hockey League forward who demonstrates the most skill in the defensive component of the game
- Frank J. Selke Memorial Trophy (Quebec Major Junior Hockey League), awarded annually to the most sportsmanlike player in the Quebec Major Junior Hockey League

== Places ==
- Selke (river), a river in the Harz Mountains of Germany
- Ballenstedt/Bode-Selke-Aue, a collective municipality in Saxony-Anhalt, Germany

== Other uses ==
- Selke Valley Railway, a German steam railway in the Harz Mountains that runs along the Selke valley

== See also ==
- Selkie
