= Hermann von Stein =

Hermann von Stein may refer to:

- Hermann von Stein (1854–1927), Prussian general of artillery and Prussian Minister of War
- Hermann Freiherr von Stein (1859–1928), Bavarian General of the Artillery, see Battle of Caporetto
