= Teufelsbach (Goldbach) =

River in Germany

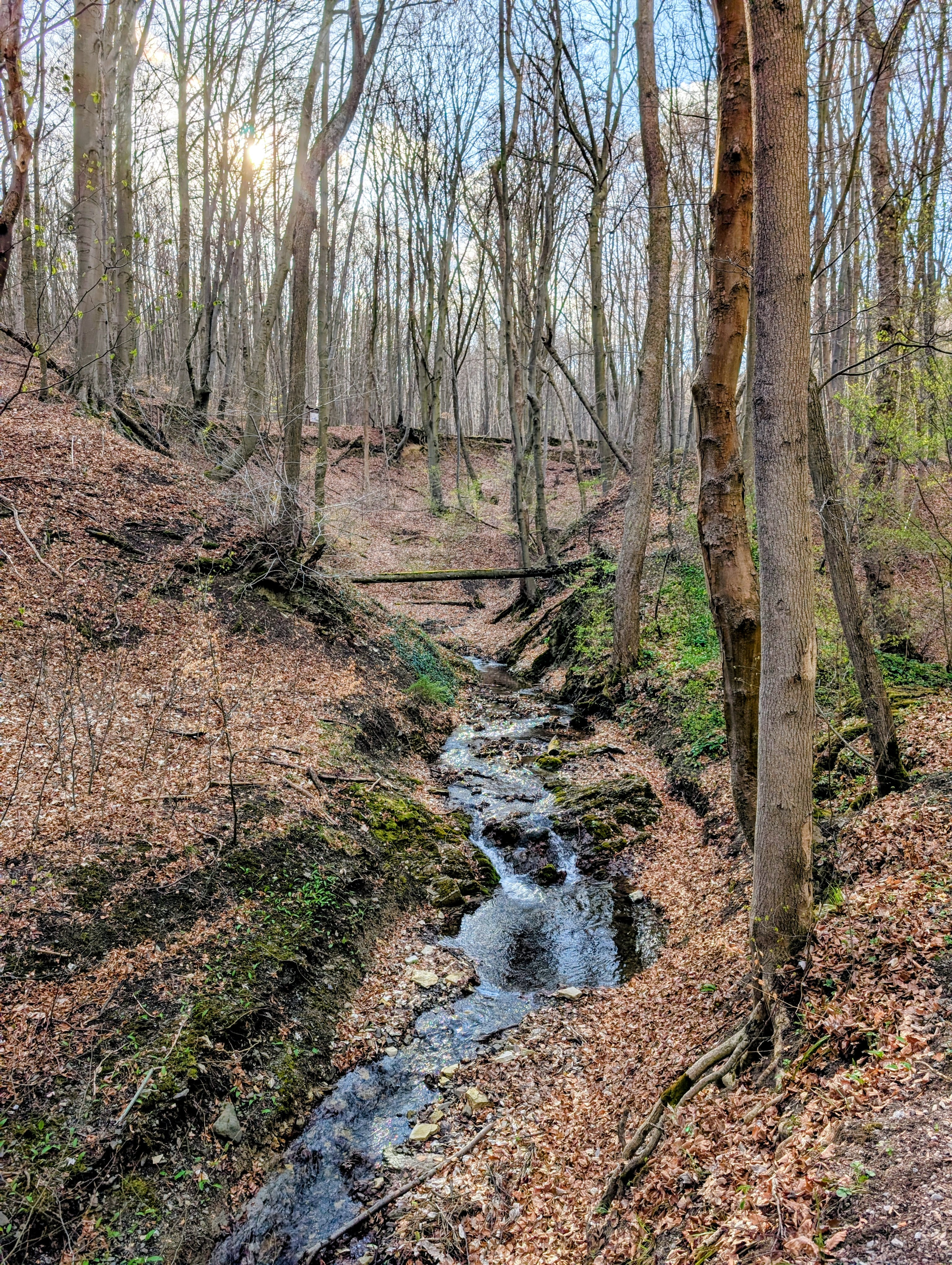

Location
- Country: Germany
- State: Saxony-Anhalt
- District: Harz
- Reference no.: DE: 568524

Physical characteristics
- Source
  - location: In the Harz near Blankenburg
  - coordinates: 51°47′31″N 10°49′49″E
  - elevation: ca. 500 m above sea level (NN)
- Mouth
  - location: Near Blankenburg into the Goldbach
  - coordinates: 51°48′40″N 10°55′34″E
  - elevation: ca. 215 m above sea level (NN)

Basin features
- Progression: Goldbach→ Bode→ Saale→ Elbe→ North Sea
- Landmarks: Large towns: Blankenburg
- Tributaries
  - right: Schmerlenbach

The Teufelsbach, formerly the Goldbeke, is a western and orographically left tributary of the Goldbach in the German state of Saxony-Anhalt.

== See also ==
- List of rivers of Saxony-Anhalt
