= Treseburg =

- Stadtteil of Thale
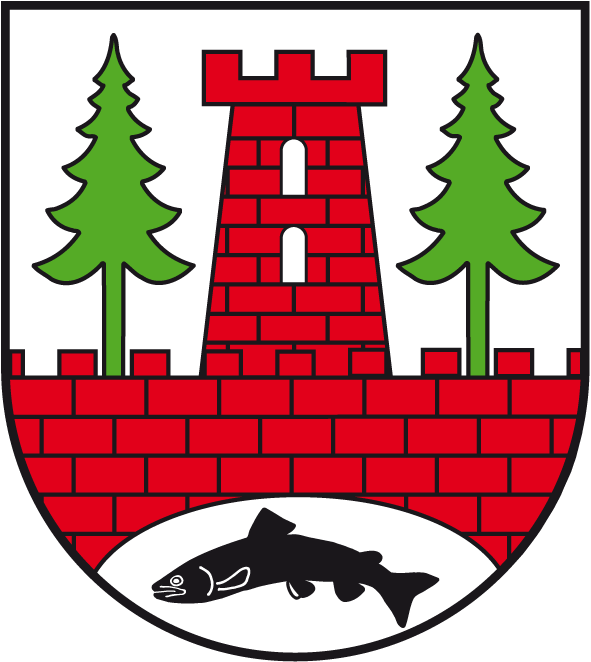
- Coat of arms
- Interactive map of Treseburg
- Location within Germany Location within Saxony-Anhalt
- Coordinates: 51°43′N 10°57′E
- Country: Germany
- State: Saxony-Anhalt
- District: Harz
- Town: Thale

Area
  - Total: 8.91 km^{2} (3.44 sq mi)
- Elevation: 423 m (1,388 ft)

Population (2006-12-31)
  - Total: 92
  - Density: 10/km^{2} (27/sq mi)
- Time zone: UTC+01:00 (CET)
  - Summer (DST): UTC+02:00 (CEST)
- Postal codes: 06502
- Dialling codes: 039456
- Vehicle registration: HZ

Treseburg (German pronunciation: [ˈtʁeːzəbʊʁk]) is a village and a former municipality in the district of Harz, in Saxony-Anhalt, Germany. Since 1 July 2009, it is part of the town Thale.

== Geography ==
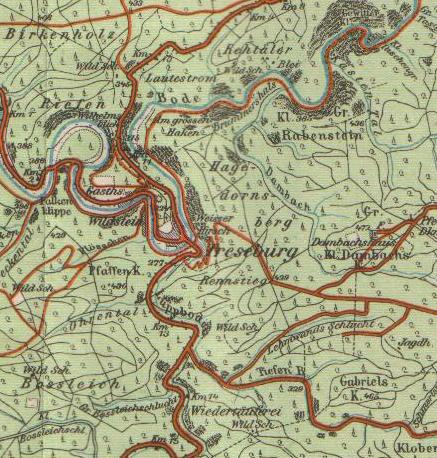
Map of Treseburg (1912)

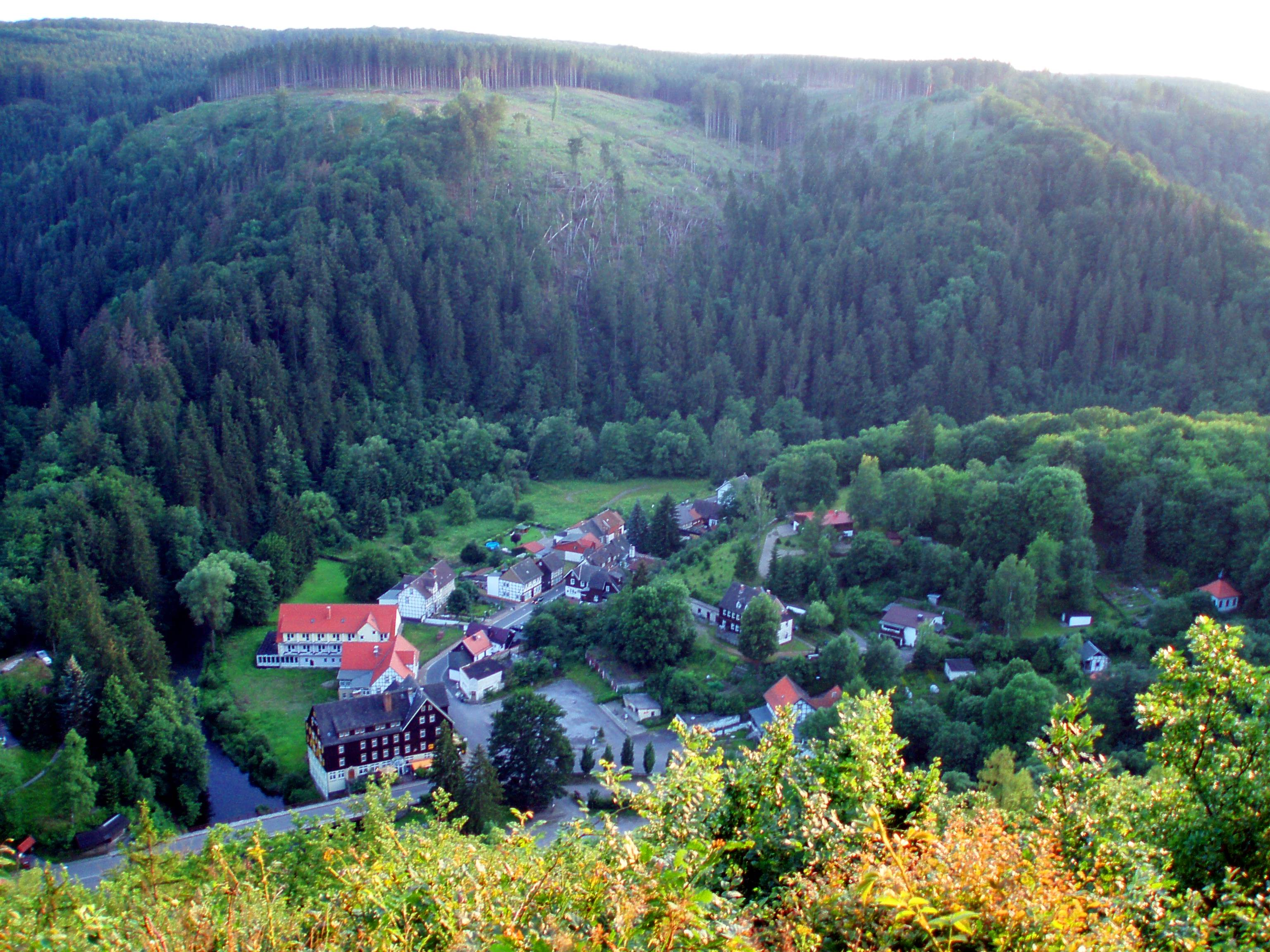
View of Treseburg from the path to the Weißer Hirsch

Treseburg lies at the confluence of the Luppbode stream with the River Bode in the Bode Gorge, southwest of Thale, at an average height of 270 m above NN.

Below Treseburg (downstream) lies the nature reserve of the Bode Gorge, through which a footpath, roughly 10 kilometres long, runs to Thale and the Rosstrappe. This footpath is closed during the winter due to the danger of rockfalls. Another path leads over the hills to the Hexentanzplatz.

== History ==
The village owes its emergence to the mining of iron and copper in the 15th to 19th centuries. Until 1784 log rafts were also assembled here before being transported down the gorge to the Thale smelting works (Thaler Hütte).'

On 19 April 1945, this was the site of the Treseburg massacre, in which the 18th Infantry Regiment of the 1st Infantry Division captured and murdered 9 unarmed Hitler Youths near the village.

On 1 July 2009 the hitherto independent municipality of Treseburg was incorporated into the borough of Thale.

== Administration ==
=== Bürgermeister ===
The last Bürgermeister ("mayor" or "parish chairman") of the village of Treseburg was Jörg-Peter Hartmann.

=== Coat of arms ===
Blazoning: "Argent, above a red bridge crenellé, a red tower crenellé, two port-holes argent, between two spruce trees vert, in base a trout gules."

("In Silber ein roter gezinnter Turm mit silbernen Durchbrüchen über eine rote gezinnte Brücke, begleitet von je einer grünen Fichte, unten eine schwarze Forelle.")

The coat-of-arms was created in 1995 by the municipal herald, Jörg Mantzsch, and entered into the approvals procedure. Approval by the Magdeburg city council was given on 1 April 1997.

=== Flag ===
The flag of the parish of Treseburg has red and silver (white) horizontal stripes emblazoned with its coat-of-arms.

== Economy ==
Treseburg is a holiday resort with cafés, restaurants and boarding houses. It is also the start and finish point for walks along the Bode Gorge.

== Gallery ==
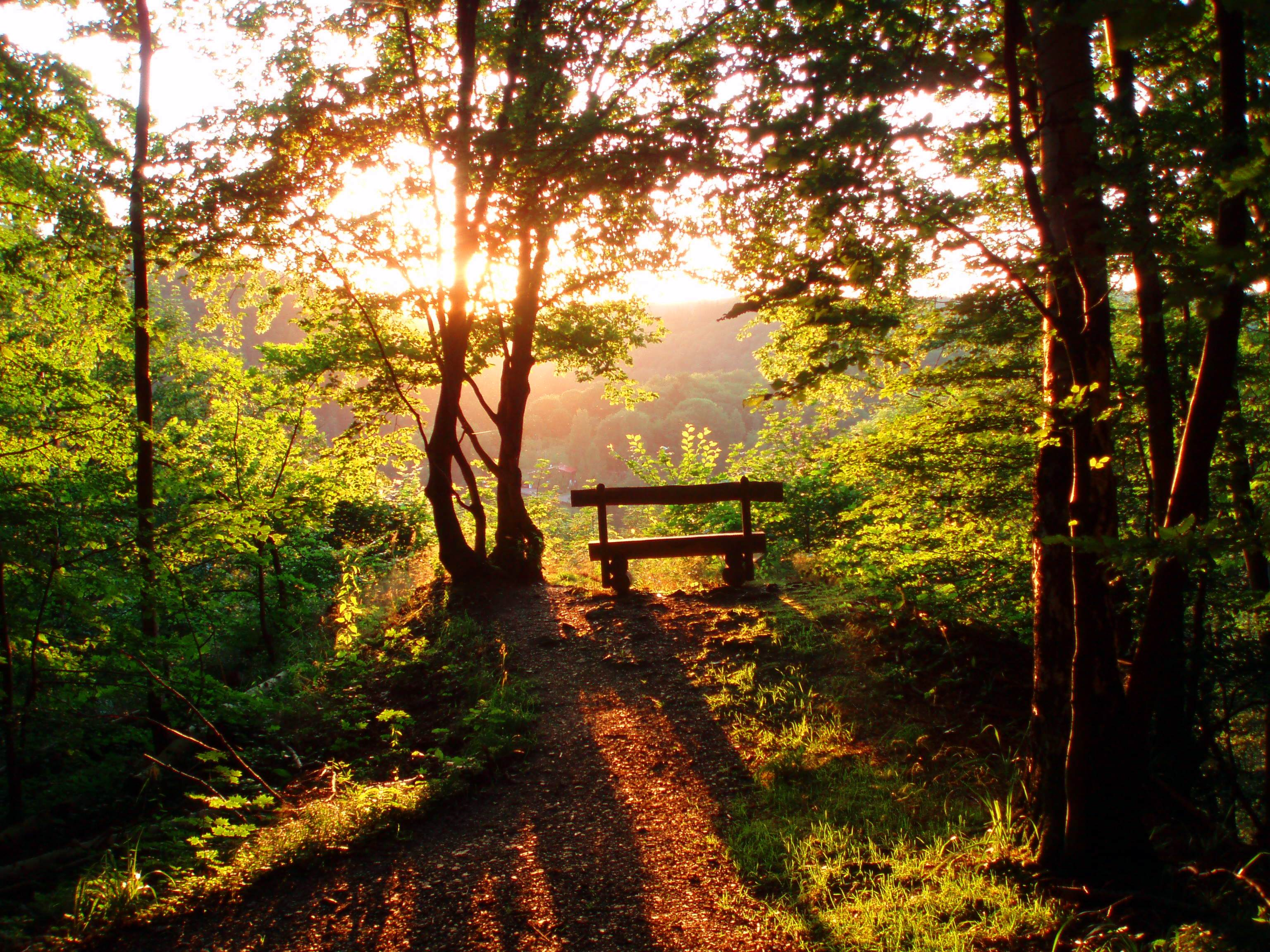
Evening on the way to the Weißer Hirsch

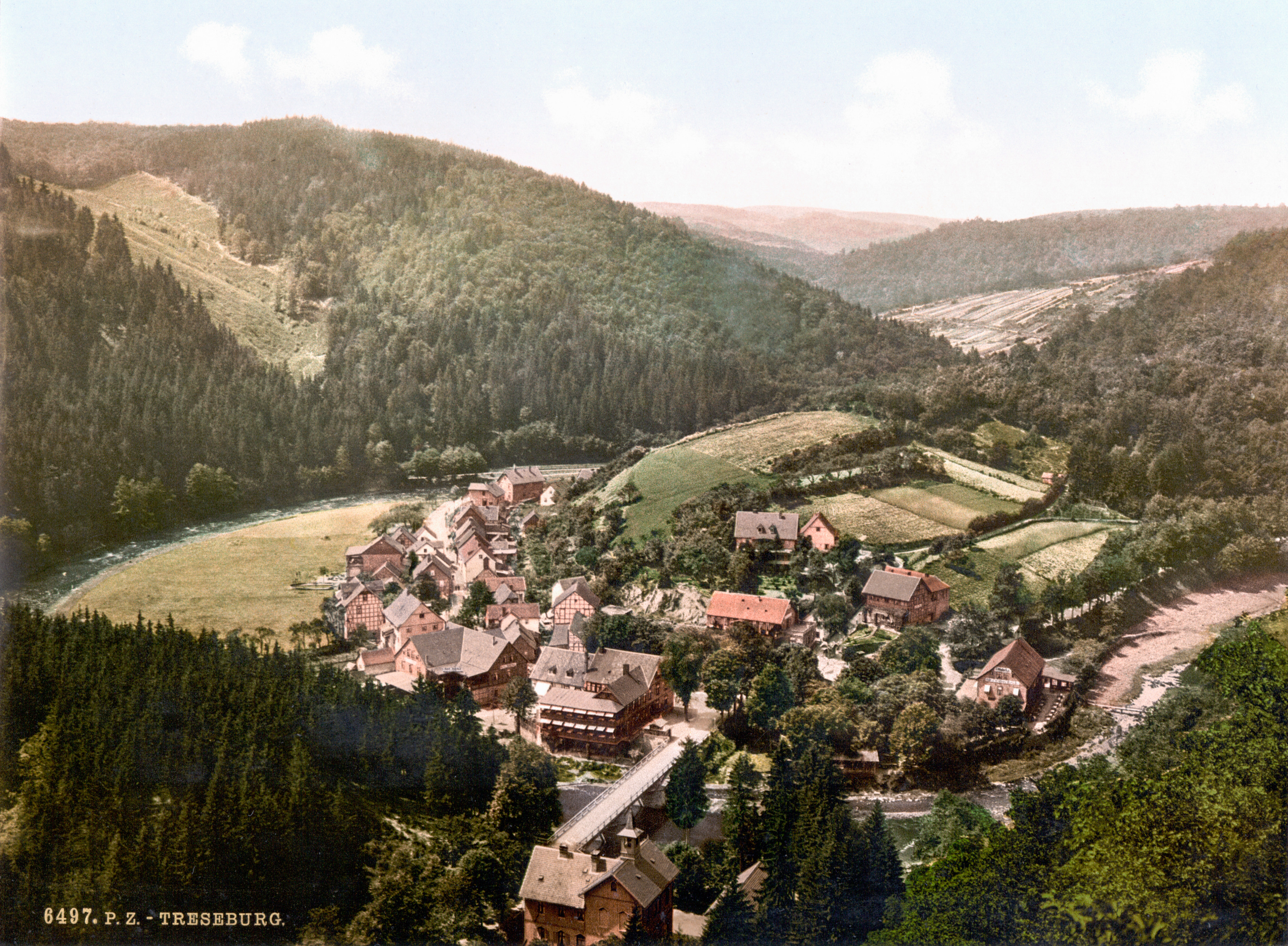
Treseburg around 1900

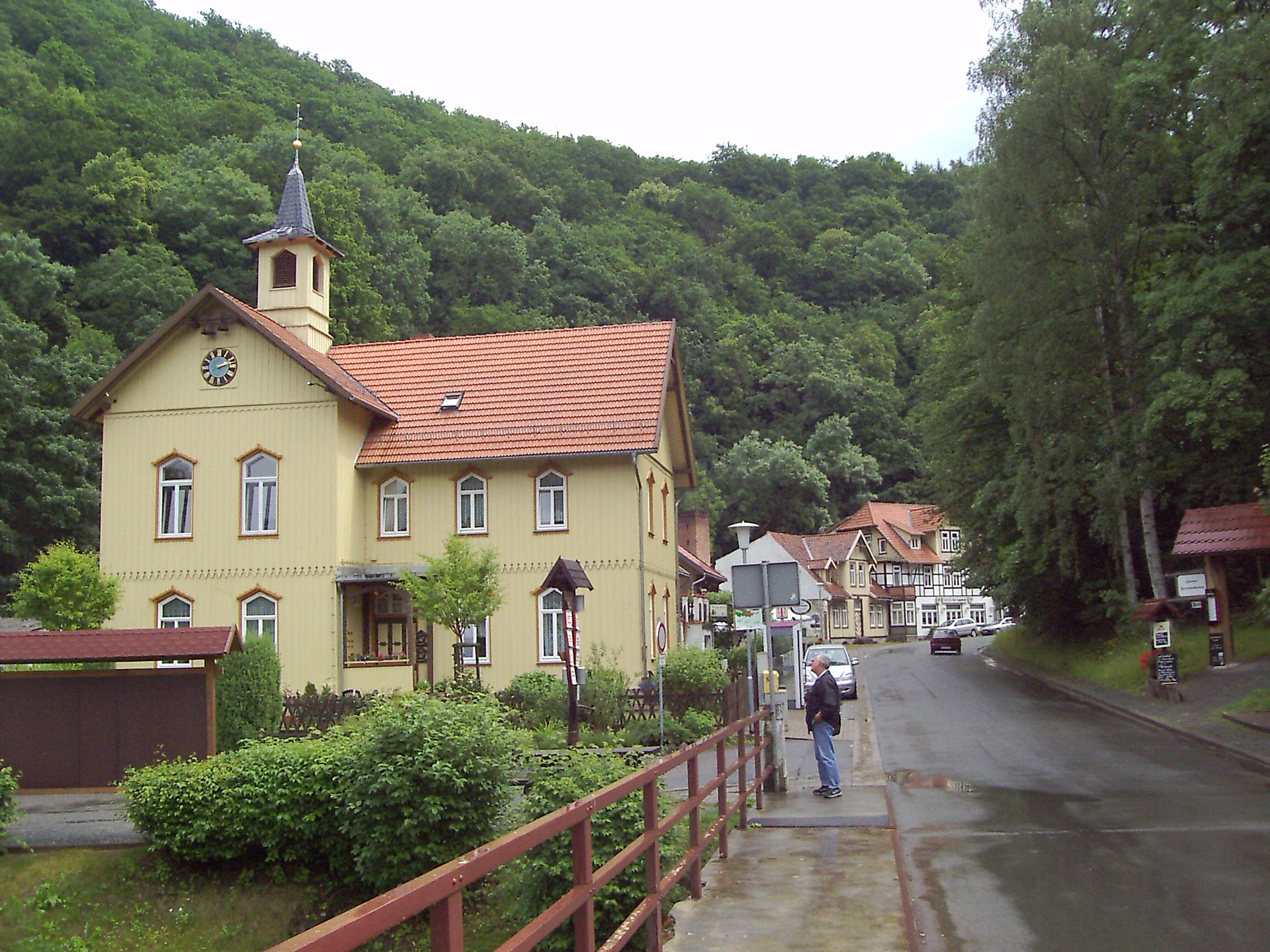
The high street in Treseburg with its church

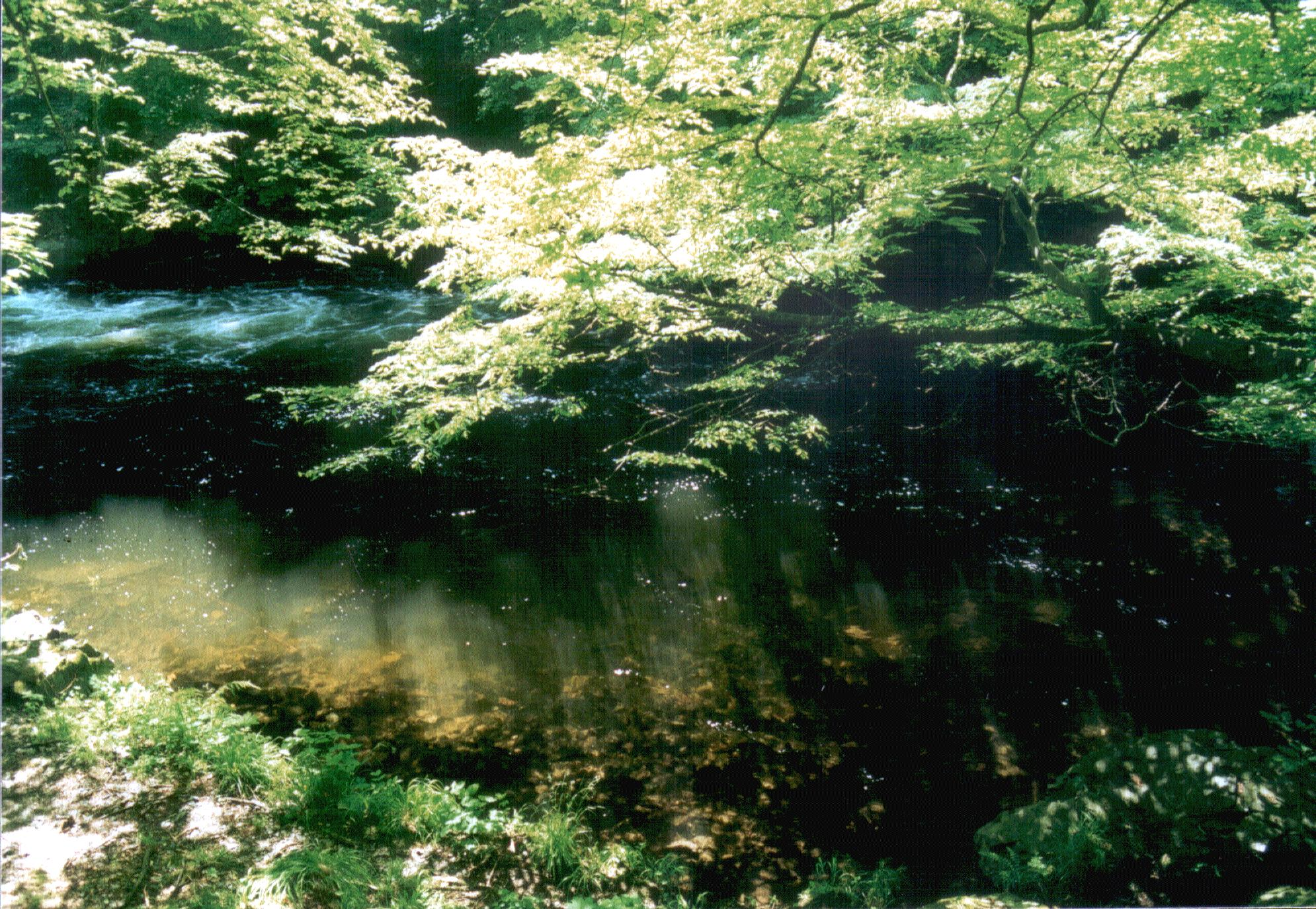
The River Bode near Treseburg

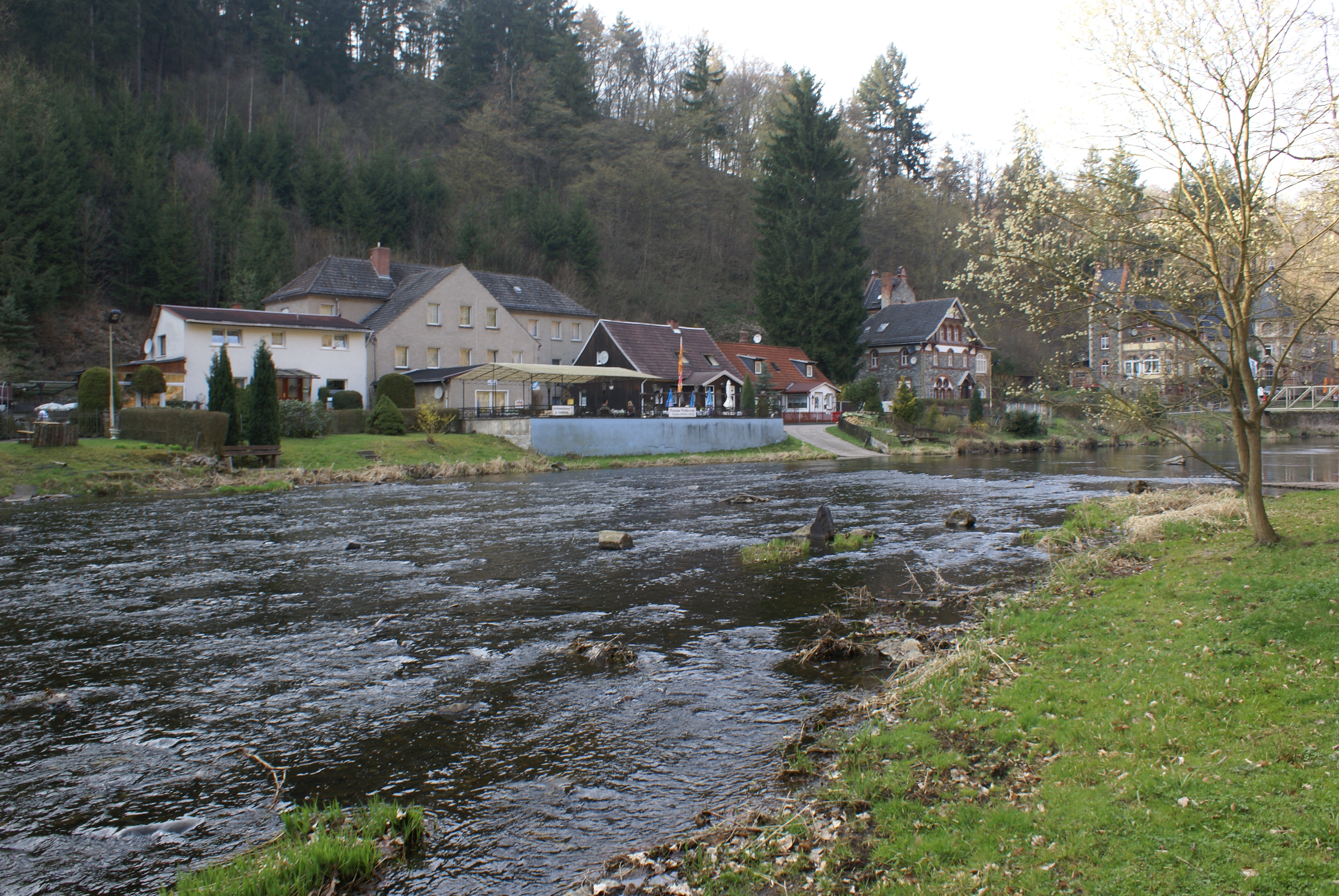
The Bode crossing in Treseburg
