= Mönchsbach =

River in Germany

Location
- Country: Germany
- States: Saxony-Anhalt

Physical characteristics
- Mouth
  - location: Goldbach
  - coordinates: 51.8064°N 10.9229°E

Basin features
- Progression: Goldbach→ Bode→ Saale→ Elbe→ North Sea

Mönchsbach is a river of Saxony-Anhalt, Germany. It flows into the Goldbach near Blankenburg (Harz).

== See also ==
- List of rivers of Saxony-Anhalt
