= Hermann von Stein (1854–1927) =

Prussian officer, General of the Artillery and Minister of War during World War I

- Hermann von Stein during WWI
- Born: 13 September 1854; Wedderstedt, Kingdom of Prussia
- Died: 26 May 1927 (aged 72); Kloster Lehnin, Germany
- Military career
- Allegiance: German Empire (to 1918)
- Branch: Heer
- Service years: 1873–1918
- Rank: General of the Artillery
- Commands: 33rd (1st Lotharingian) Field Artillery; 41st Division; XIV Reserve Corps; Prussian Ministry of War
- Conflicts: World War I
- Awards: Pour le Mérite

Hermann Christlieb Matthäus Stein, from 1913 von Stein (13 September 1854, in Wedderstedt – 26 May 1927, in Kloster Lehnin) was a Prussian officer, General of the Artillery and Minister of War during World War I. He was a recipient of Pour le Mérite.

== Awards ==
- Iron Cross II Class
- Iron Cross I Class
- Pour le Mérite (1 September 1916)

Political offices
Preceded by Adolf Wild von Hohenborn	Prussian Minister of War; 29 October 1916–9 October 1918	Succeeded by Heinrich Scheuch
Military offices
Preceded by Georg von Waldersee	Quartermaster-General of the German Army; 8 February 1914 – 10 October 1914	Succeeded by Werner von Voigts-Rhetz
