= Teufelsbach (Alaunbach) =

River in Bonn, Germany

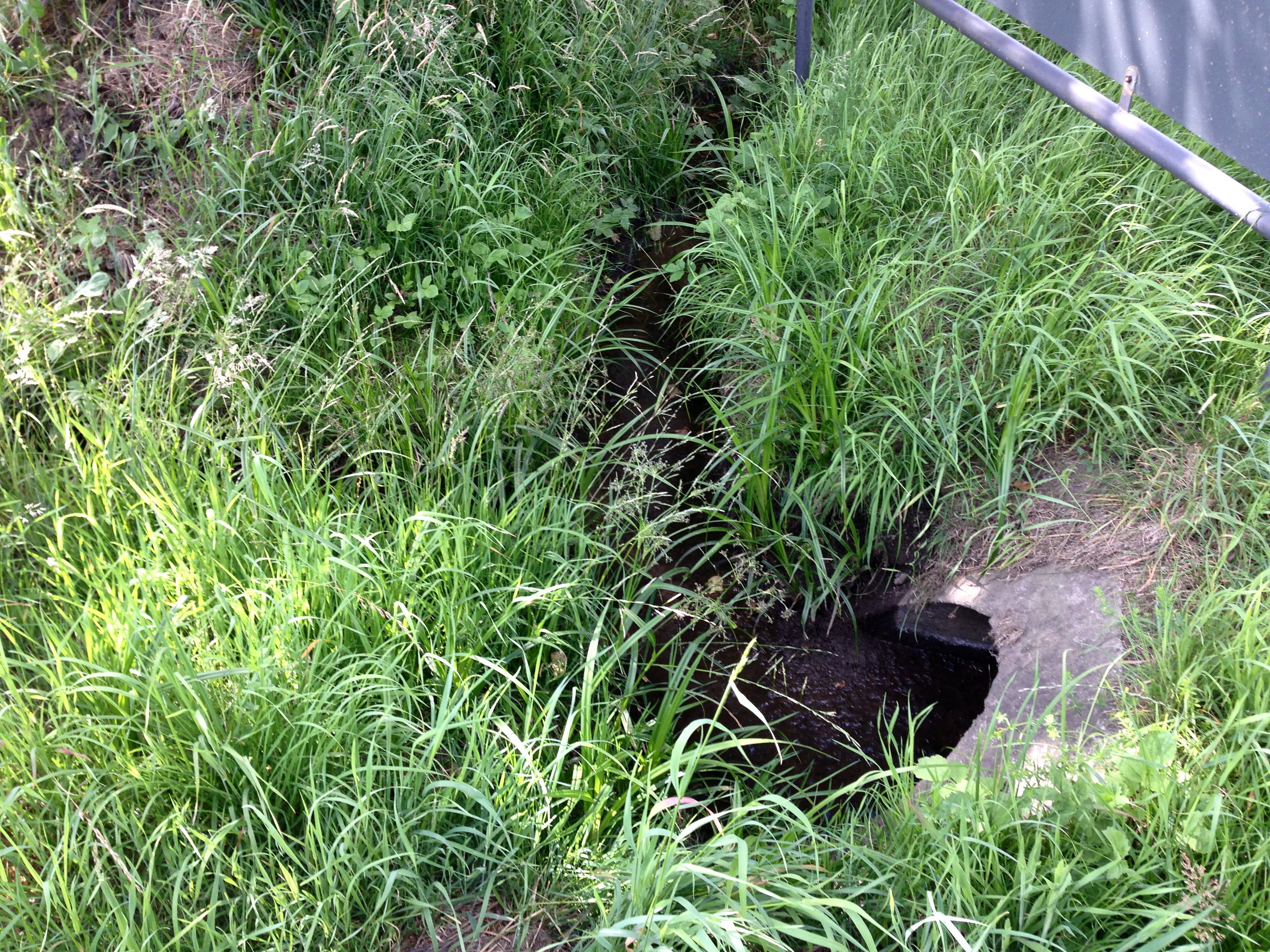

Location
- Country: Germany
- State: North Rhine-Westphalia

Physical characteristics
- Source
  - location: Beuel, district of Bonn
  - coordinates: 50.7391°N 7.1663°E
- Mouth
  - location: Beuel, district of Bonn
  - coordinates: 50.7433°N 7.1635°E

Basin features
- Progression: Alaunbach→ Vilicher Bach→ Rhine→ North Sea

Teufelsbach is a small river of North Rhine-Westphalia, Germany.

The Teufelsbach is situated in the Beuel district of Bonn. It is a left tributary of the Alaunbach.

== See also ==
- List of rivers of North Rhine-Westphalia
