= Vorharz =

- Verbandsgemeinde
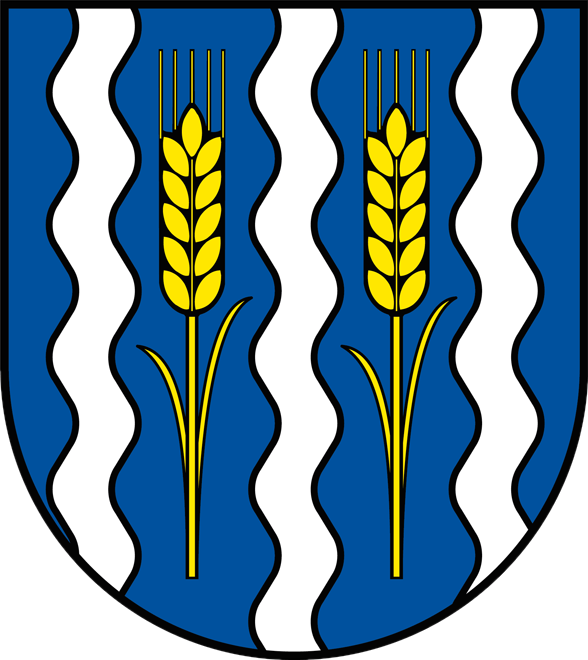
- Coat of arms

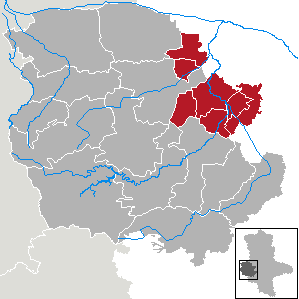
- Map of Harz highlighting Vorharz
- Interactive map of Vorharz
- Location within Germany Location within Saxony-Anhalt
- Coordinates: 51°52′N 11°10′E
- Country: Germany
- State: Saxony-Anhalt
- District: Harz
- Seat: Wegeleben

Area
  - Total: 208.8 km^{2} (80.6 sq mi)

Population (2025-12-31)
  - Total: 11,396
  - Density: 54.58/km^{2} (141.4/sq mi)
- Time zone: UTC+01:00 (CET)
  - Summer (DST): UTC+02:00 (CEST)
- Website: www.vorharz.net

Vorharz is a Verbandsgemeinde ("collective municipality") in the Harz district, in Saxony-Anhalt, Germany. It is situated east of Halberstadt. It was created on 1 January 2010. The seat of the Verbandsgemeinde is in Wegeleben.

The Verbandsgemeinde Vorharz consists of the following municipalities:

1. Ditfurt
2. Groß Quenstedt
3. Harsleben
4. Hedersleben
5. Schwanebeck
6. Selke-Aue
7. Wegeleben
