= Hausneindorf =

- Ortsteil of Selke-Aue
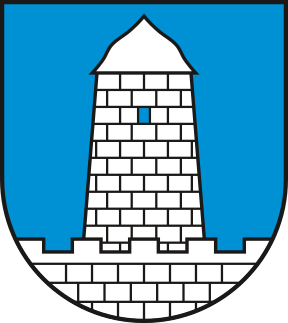
- Coat of arms
- Interactive map of Hausneindorf
- Location within Germany Location within Saxony-Anhalt
- Coordinates: 51°50′24″N 11°16′14″E
- Country: Germany
- State: Saxony-Anhalt
- District: Harz
- Municipality: Selke-Aue

Area
  - Total: 14.1 km^{2} (5.4 sq mi)
- Elevation: 115 m (377 ft)

Population (2006-12-31)
  - Total: 819
  - Density: 58.1/km^{2} (150/sq mi)
- Time zone: UTC+01:00 (CET)
  - Summer (DST): UTC+02:00 (CEST)
- Postal codes: 06458
- Dialling codes: 039481
- Vehicle registration: HZ

Hausneindorf (German pronunciation: [haʊsˈnaɪndɔʁf]) is a village and a former municipality in the district of Harz, in Saxony-Anhalt, Germany. Since 1 January 2010, it is part of the municipality Selke-Aue.

== Notable residents ==
- Julius Reubke (1834-1858), composer, pianist, and organist
