= Wegeleben =

- Town
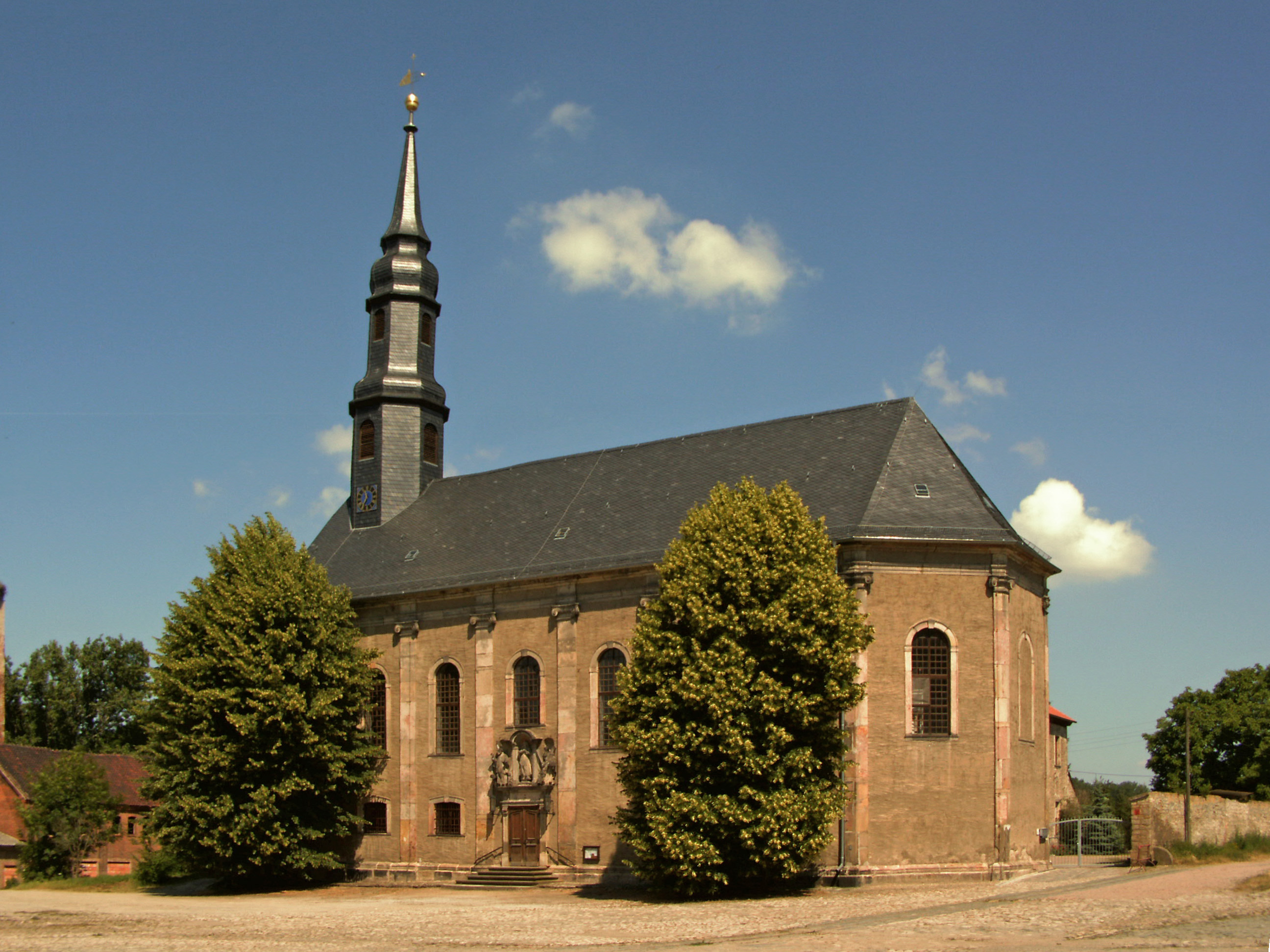
- Saint Nicholas Church in Adersleben

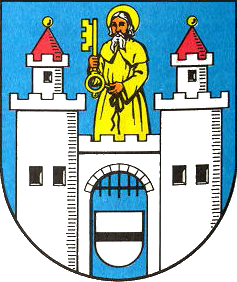
- Coat of arms

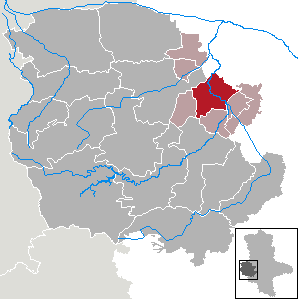
- Location of Wegeleben within Harz district
- Interactive map of Wegeleben
- Location within Germany Location within Saxony-Anhalt
- Coordinates: 51°52′N 11°10′E
- Country: Germany
- State: Saxony-Anhalt
- District: Harz
- Municipal assoc.: Vorharz
- Subdivisions: 4

Government
  - Mayor (2021–28): René Kerl (CDU)

Area
  - Total: 51.78 km^{2} (19.99 sq mi)
- Elevation: 103 m (338 ft)

Population (2025-12-31)
  - Total: 2,333
  - Density: 45.06/km^{2} (116.7/sq mi)
- Time zone: UTC+01:00 (CET)
  - Summer (DST): UTC+02:00 (CEST)
- Postal codes: 38828
- Dialling codes: 039423
- Vehicle registration: HZ
- Website: bode-holtemme.de

Wegeleben (German pronunciation: [ˈveːɡəˌleːbm̩]) is a town in the Harz district, in Saxony-Anhalt, Germany. It is the administrative seat of the Verbandsgemeinde ("collective municipality") Vorharz.

== Geography ==
It is situated at the confluence of the Goldbach and Bode rivers, east of Halberstadt. The municipal area comprises the villages of Adersleben, Deesdorf, and Rodersdorf. Wegeleben station is a stop on the Halberstadt–Vienenburg and Magdeburg–Thale railway lines.

== History ==
Wegeleben in the Saxon Harzgau was the site of a fortress possibly erected at the behest of King Henry the Fowler during the Hungarian invasions in the 10th century. The castle later served as a residence of the Prince-Bishops of Halberstadt. The adjacent settlement was mentioned as a town (civitas) in the 13th century, when it had been fortified with defensive walls and city gates. The ruling Ascanian counts ceded their fief in pawn to the Bishop of Halberstadt in 1288 and finally sold it in 1318.

Ravaged by the Thirty Years' War, Wegeleben with the Bishopric of Halberstadt passed to Brandenburg-Prussia in 1648. It was finally seized as a reverted fief by the Hohenzollern king Frederick I in 1704. From 1815 it was incorporated into the Prussian Province of Saxony. The town received railway access in 1862.

Until 2010 Wegeleben was part of the disbanded Verbandsgemeinde Bode-Holtemme.

== Politics ==
Seats in the municipal assembly (Stadtrat) as of 2014 local elections:

- Christian Democratic Union: 10
- Free Democratic Party: 1
- Independents: 3

== Notable people ==
- Wilhelm Schmidt (1858–1924), engineer and inventor
- Martin Bormann (1900–1945), Nazi official
- John Bura (1944–2023), bishop
- Jürgen Pommerenke (born 1953), footballer
