= Goldbach (Bode) =

River in Germany

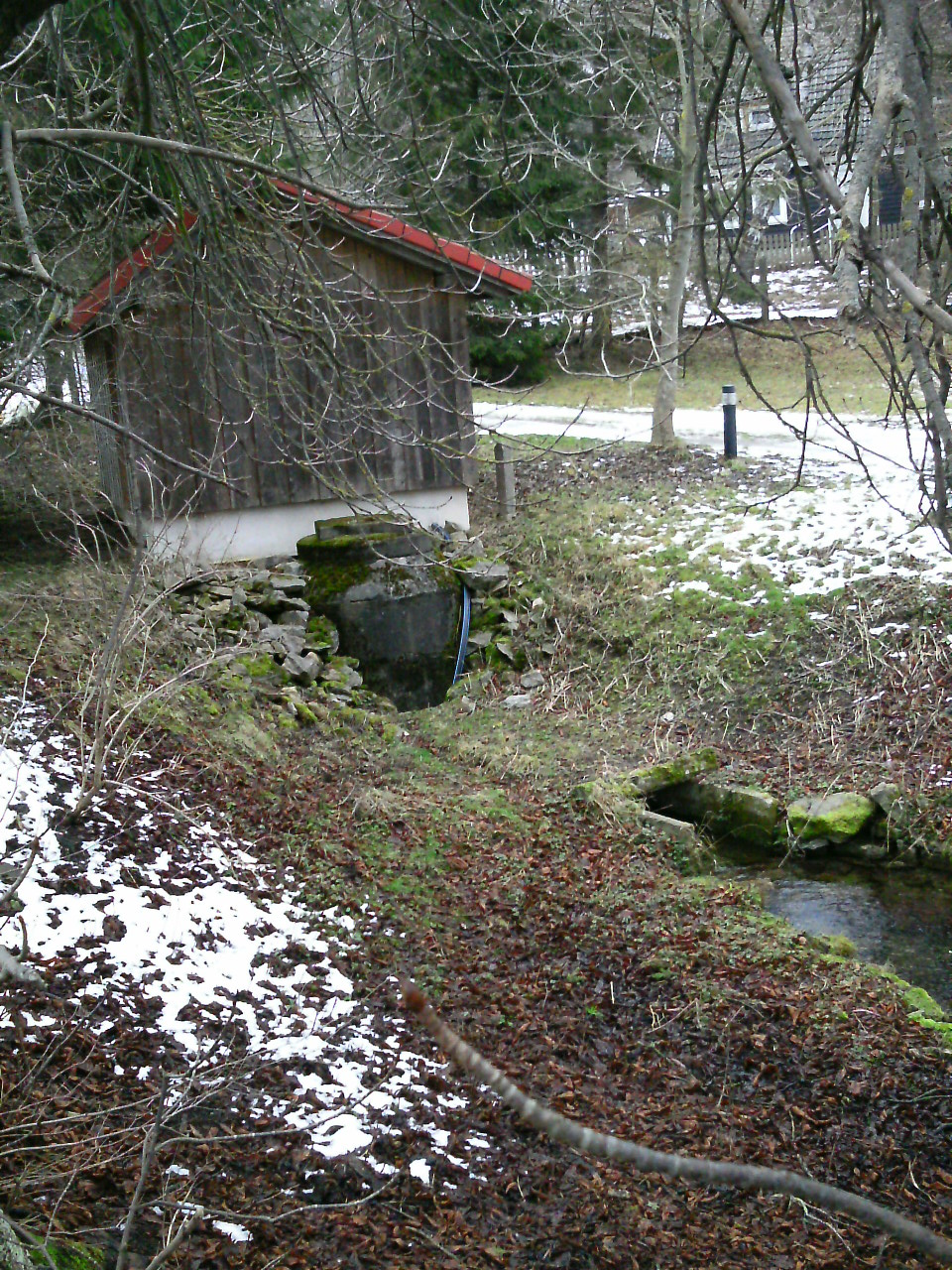
- One source of the Goldbach

Location
- Country: Germany
- State: Saxony-Anhalt
- Reference no.: DE: 56852

Physical characteristics
- Source
  - location: east of Hartenberg fell near Elbingerode
  - coordinates: 51°47′31″N 10°49′49″E
  - elevation: c. 516 m above sea level (NHN)
- Mouth
  - location: in Wegeleben into the Bode
  - coordinates: 51°53′20″N 11°10′59″E
- Length: 34 km (21 mi)
- Basin size: 101 km^{2} (39 sq mi)

Basin features
- Progression: Bode→ Saale→ Elbe→ North Sea

The Goldbach (German pronunciation: [ˈɡɔltbax]) is a river of Saxony-Anhalt, Germany. It is a left tributary of the River Bode, about 30 kilometres (19 mi) long, in the Harz Mountains.

== Course ==
The Goldbach rises east of the uplands of Elbingerode. There are three major headwaters. The longer one, traditionally called Teufelsbach (Devil's Beck), is defined as the upper course, hydrographically. The other one, starting from a spring called Eggeröder Brunnen, traditionally is called Klostergrundbach (Convent Dale Beck) or Goldbach. The third major headwater is the Silberborn or Mönchsbach in Silberborn Valley, passing beneath Michaelstein Abbey. Their confluence is near Mönchemühle (Monks' Mill) in Blankenburg. In spring, the headwaters of the Goldbach can become raging meltwater torrents.

The stream passes under the B 6 federal highway and is joined by some other streams. In the forelands of Harz Mountains, it passes Langenstein and flows below the Spiegelsberge hills through the southern outskirts of Halberstadt. Then it passes through the center of Harsleben and reaches Wegeleben, where it discharges into River Bode.

== Fauna ==
Numerous endangered species live in the Goldbach, such as the brown trout and small shellfish.

== Tributaries ==
- Molkegraben (right)
- Sauteichsgraben (left)

== See also ==
- List of rivers of Saxony-Anhalt
