= Selke-Aue =

- Municipality
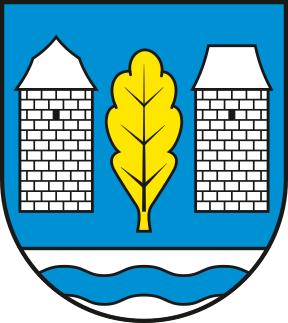
- Coat of arms

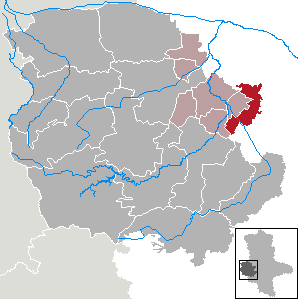
- Location of Selke-Aue within Harz district
- Interactive map of Selke-Aue
- Location within Germany Location within Saxony-Anhalt
- Coordinates: 51°50′N 11°15′E
- Country: Germany
- State: Saxony-Anhalt
- District: Harz
- Municipal assoc.: Vorharz

Government
  - Mayor (2023–30): Uwe Fabian

Area
  - Total: 36.72 km^{2} (14.18 sq mi)
- Elevation: 120 m (390 ft)

Population (2025-12-31)
  - Total: 1,236
  - Density: 33.66/km^{2} (87.18/sq mi)
- Time zone: UTC+01:00 (CET)
  - Summer (DST): UTC+02:00 (CEST)
- Postal codes: 06458
- Dialling codes: 039481
- Vehicle registration: HZ

Selke-Aue (German pronunciation: [ˈzɛlkə ˈʔaʊə]) is a municipality in the district of Harz, in Saxony-Anhalt, Germany. It was formed on 1 January 2010 by the merger of the former municipalities Hausneindorf, Heteborn and Wedderstedt.
