= Heteborn =

- Ortsteil of Selke-Aue
- Interactive map of Heteborn
- Location within Germany Location within Saxony-Anhalt
- Coordinates: 51°53′35″N 11°17′28″E
- Country: Germany
- State: Saxony-Anhalt
- District: Harz
- Municipality: Selke-Aue

Area
  - Total: 14.94 km^{2} (5.77 sq mi)
- Elevation: 192 m (630 ft)

Population (2006-12-31)
  - Total: 383
  - Density: 25.6/km^{2} (66.4/sq mi)
- Time zone: UTC+01:00 (CET)
  - Summer (DST): UTC+02:00 (CEST)
- Postal codes: 06458
- Dialling codes: 039481
- Vehicle registration: HZ

Heteborn (German pronunciation: [ˈheːtəbɔʁn]) is a village and a former municipality in the district of Harz, in Saxony-Anhalt, Germany. Since 1 January 2010, it is part of the municipality Selke-Aue.
