= Ilsenburg (Verwaltungsgemeinschaft) =

Former collective municipality in Saxony-Anhalt, Germany

Coordinates: 51°52′N 10°41′E

Ilsenburg (Harz) was a Verwaltungsgemeinschaft ("collective municipality") in the district of Harz, in Saxony-Anhalt, Germany. The seat of the Verwaltungsgemeinschaft was in Ilsenburg. It was disbanded in July 2009.

The Verwaltungsgemeinschaft Ilsenburg consisted of the following municipalities:

1. Darlingerode
2. Drübeck
3. Ilsenburg
