= Großer Graben and Schiffgraben =

River in Germany

Großer Graben / Schiffgraben
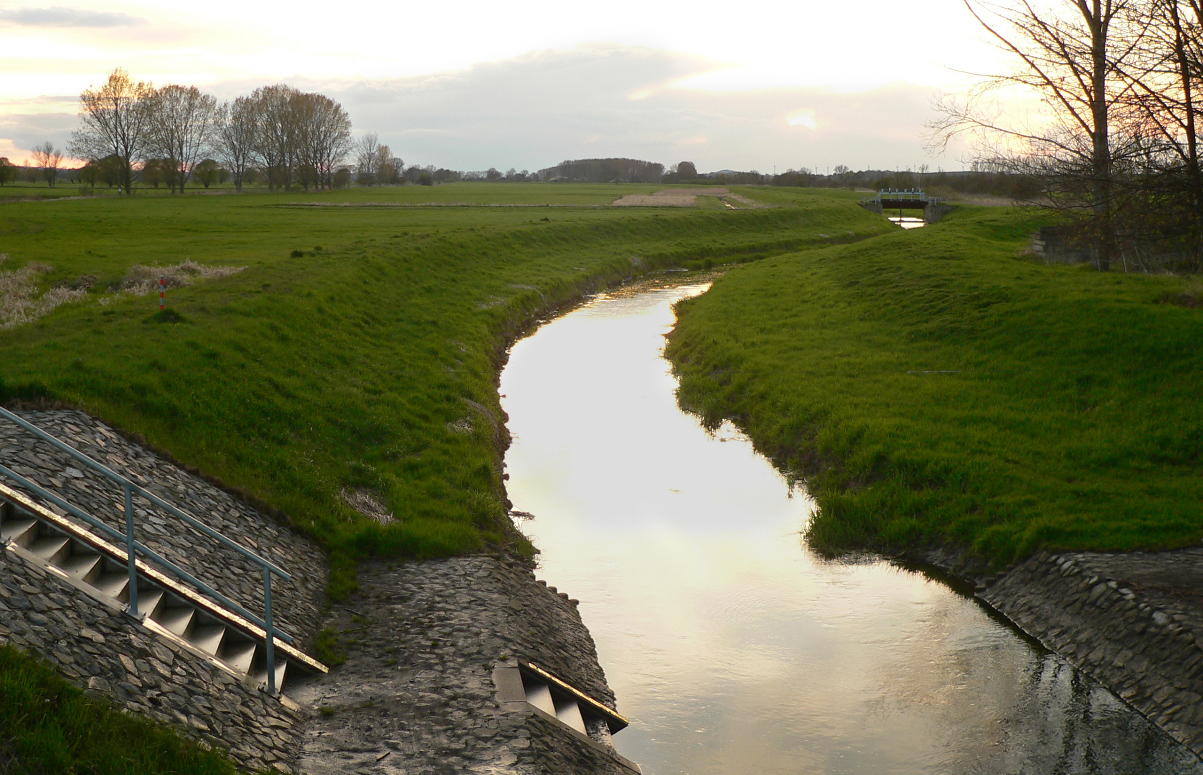

Location
- Country: Germany
- States: Lower Saxony and Saxony-Anhalt

Physical characteristics
- Source
  - coordinates: 52°03′N 10°42′E
  - elevation: 86 m (282 ft)
- Length: 46 km (29 mi)

Basin features
- River system: Weser and Elbe

Großer Graben and Schiffgraben together are an artificial waterbody with ambiguous flows in Lower Saxony and Saxony-Anhalt, Germany, partly forming the border of both Länder.

It is fed by lateral sources and by the humidity of the wetland it passes. The western part of this waterway is an affluent of river Ilse, part of Weser bassin, the eastern part an affluent of river Bode, part of Elbe bassin. The top, almost without flow, is a pseudo-bifurcation and part of the section called Schiffgraben. The border between the names Großer Graben and Schiffgraben is situated east of the pseudo-bifurcation.

The names Großer Graben (Large Canal) and Schiffgraben (Ship Canal) are because in old ages it was intended to use them as a waterway.

== See also ==
- List of rivers of Lower Saxony
- List of rivers of Saxony-Anhalt
