= Sarre (Bode) =

River in Germany

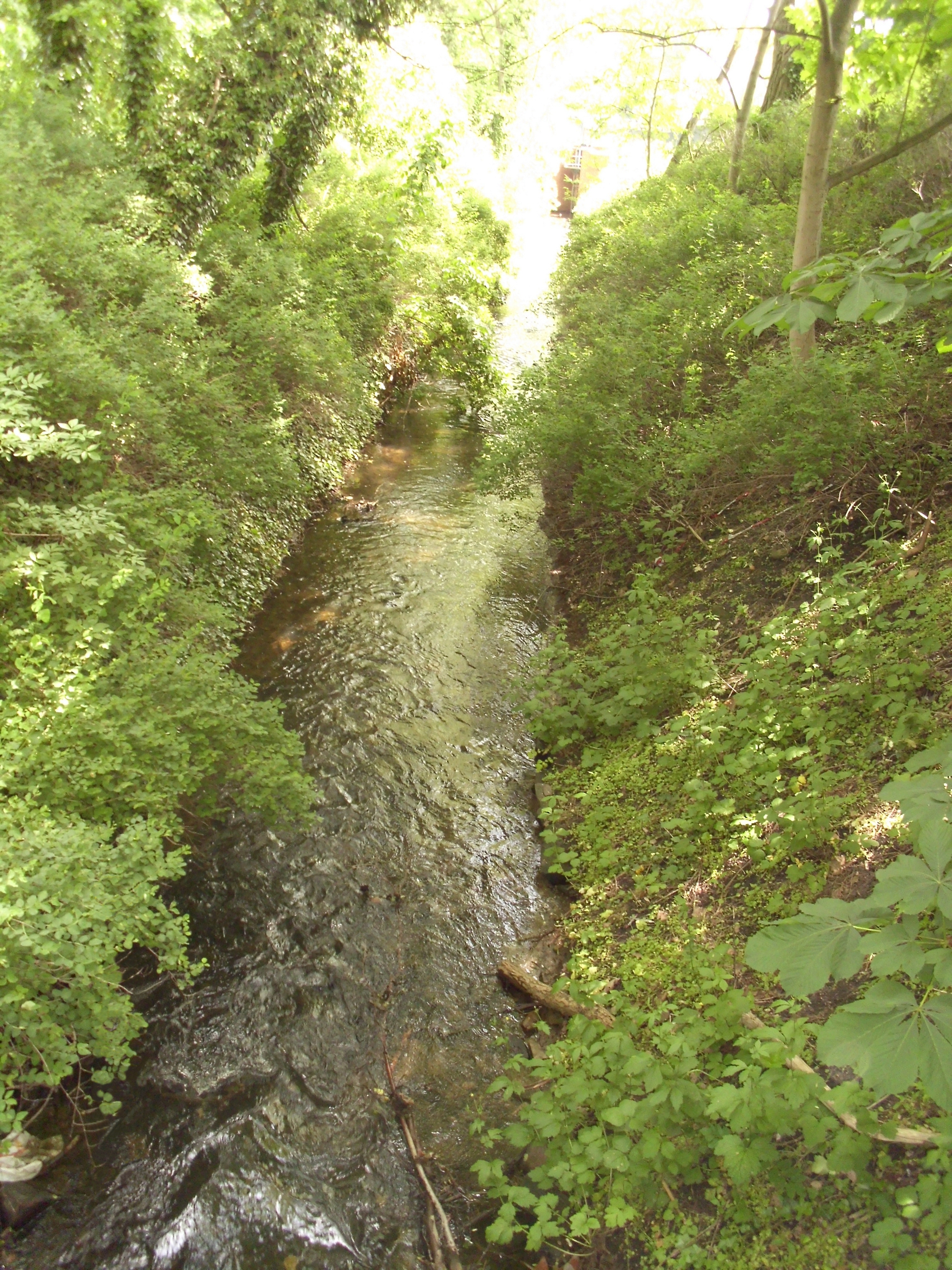
- The Sarre by Wanzleben Castle

Location
- Country: Germany
- State: Saxony-Anhalt
- District: Börde
- Reference no.: DE: SAL19OW06-00

Physical characteristics
- Source
  - location: Der große Teich
  - coordinates: 52°06′21″N 11°21′47″E
  - elevation: 123.6 m above sea level (NN)
- Mouth
  - location: Groß Germersleben
  - coordinates: 51°59′47″N 11°22′12″E
  - elevation: 72.1 m above sea level (NN)
- Basin size: 67.50 km²

Basin features
- Progression: Bode→ Saale→ Elbe→ North Sea
- Landmarks: Small towns: Wanzleben-Börde
- Tributaries
  - right: Röthebach, Sauerbach
- Navigable: no

The Sarre is a river in Saxony-Anhalt, Germany. It is a left tributary of the Bode, which it joins near Groß Germersleben.

== See also ==
- List of rivers of Saxony-Anhalt
