= Luppbode =

River in Germany

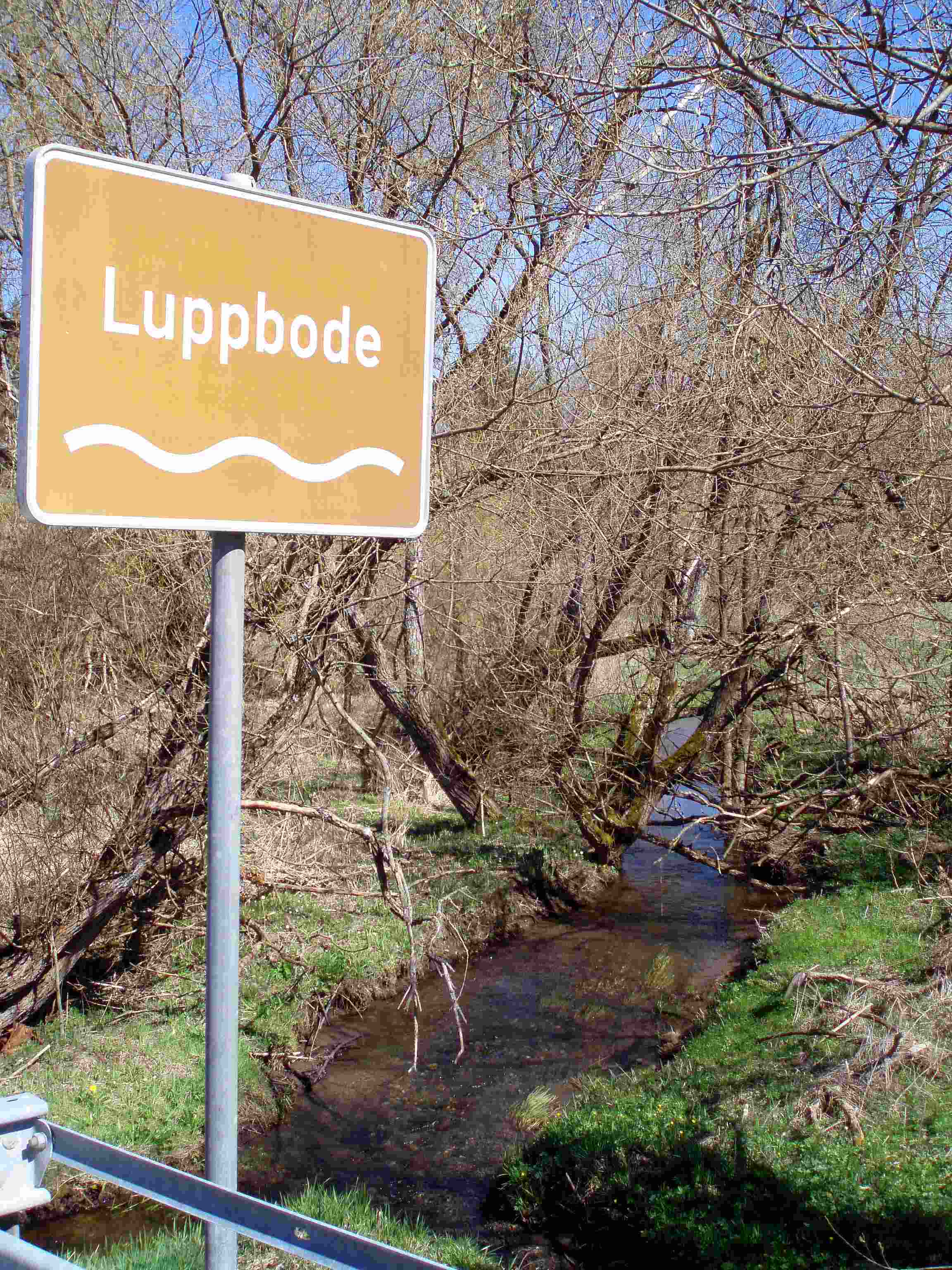
- The Luppbode near Allrode

Location
- Country: Germany
- State: Saxony-Anhalt

Physical characteristics
- Source
  - location: south of Allrode
  - coordinates: 51°39′46″N 10°58′04″E
  - elevation: 485 m (0.301 mi)
- Mouth
  - location: near Treseburg into the Bode
  - coordinates: 51°42′57″N 10°58′31″E
- Length: 10 km (6.2 mi)

Basin features
- Progression: Bode→ Saale→ Elbe→ North Sea

The Luppbode is a right-hand tributary of the Bode in the Harz mountains in the German state of Saxony-Anhalt. It flows for about 10 km (6.2 mi) at a height of 485 m (0.301 mi).

== Course ==
The Luppbode rises south of Allrode and flows in a northerly direction. It continues as a lively, babbling brook, parallel to the L93 road. In spring, the Luppbode swells into a raging meltwater torrent in places. It is one of the few right-hand tributary streams that flow into the Bode in the area of the Bode Gorge. Its mouth is opposite the village of Treseburg.

== Fauna ==
A large number of threatened animal species live in the Luppbode, such as the brown trout and small shellfish.

== Tributaries ==
- Steinbornsbach (left)
- Trockenbach (left)

== See also ==
- List of rivers of Saxony-Anhalt
