= Teufelsbach (Rhynerscher Bach) =

River in Germany

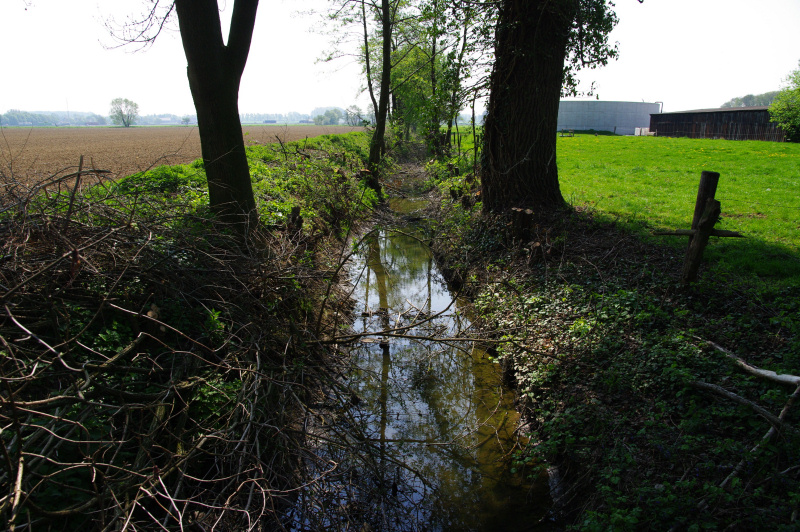

Location
- Country: Germany
- State: North Rhine-Westphalia

Physical characteristics
- Mouth
  - location: Rhynerscher Bach
  - coordinates: 51°37′54″N 7°48′33″E

Basin features
- Progression: Rhynerscher Bach→ Wiescher Bach→ Lippe→ Rhine→ North Sea

Teufelsbach, also called Ostfeldgraben and Freisker Bach, is a river of North Rhine-Westphalia, Germany. It is 2.9 km (1.8 mi) long and is a left tributary of the Rhynerscher Bach. It flows for most of its length through the city of Hamm.

== See also ==
- List of rivers of North Rhine-Westphalia
