= Hedersleben, Harz =

Hedersleben
- Municipality
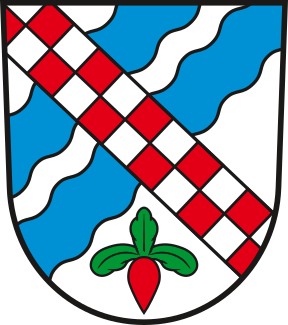
- Coat of arms

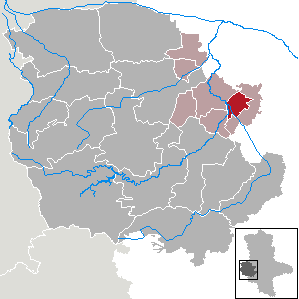
- Location of Hedersleben within Harz district
- Interactive map of Hedersleben
- Location within Germany Location within Saxony-Anhalt
- Coordinates: 51°51′N 11°15′E
- Country: Germany
- State: Saxony-Anhalt
- District: Harz
- Municipal assoc.: Vorharz

Government
  - Mayor (2022–29): Adolf Speck

Area
  - Total: 16.46 km^{2} (6.36 sq mi)
- Elevation: 101 m (331 ft)

Population (2025-12-31)
  - Total: 1,228
  - Density: 74.61/km^{2} (193.2/sq mi)
- Time zone: UTC+01:00 (CET)
  - Summer (DST): UTC+02:00 (CEST)
- Postal codes: 06458
- Dialling codes: 039481
- Vehicle registration: HZ

Hedersleben is a municipality in the district of Harz in Saxony-Anhalt, Germany. It lies on the river Selke, directly upstream of its confluence with the river Bode. The current mayor is Adolf Speck.
