= Alaunbach =

River in Germany

Coordinates: 50.7508°N 7.1540°E

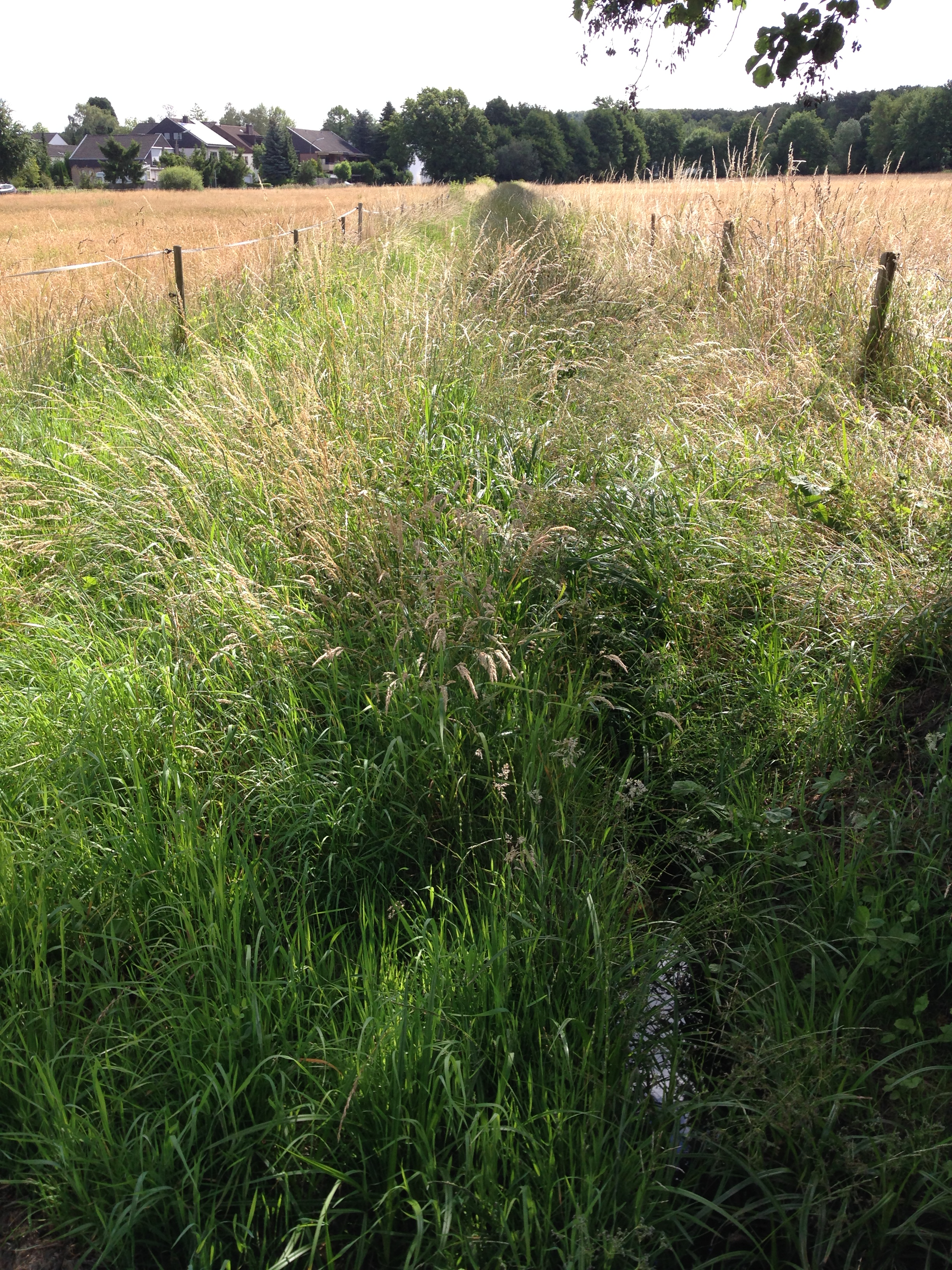

Location
- Country: Germany
- State: North Rhine-Westphalia

The Alaunbach is a left tributary of the Vilicher Bach in Bonn, district of Beuel. Its total length is 2.51 kilometers and its catchment area is 1.7 square kilometers. It is located in Germany. The creek is heavily anthropogenic, especially in its lower section in the commercial area of Pützchen and in the settlement area of Bechlinghoven. Site-appropriate riparian trees are rarely found. The stream areas above the “Am Rehsprung” allotment gardens are more natural.

Overall, the creek can be described as poor in species and individuals.

Originally, the stream flowed from the headwaters on the Hardt between Holzlar and Niederholtorf directly into the Mühlenbach, which is also used for cattle watering, presumably along the Hardtweiherstraße at the former mill pond there. After complaints from residents, the section up to the confluence of the Teufelsbach was taken over by Leopold in accordance with an agreement brokered by the mayor of Vilich in 1822 between farmers from Bechlinghoven and Holzlar and the miner Leopold Bleibtreu "for himself and as business representative of the mining and metallurgical union on the Hardt".

Bleibtreu created as a "ditch" to receive the "vitriolic discharges from the Rothenberg" and the waste water from the two alum smelters[3]. The Alaunbach now served as an open sewage ditch for the harmful sulphate, i.e. sulphurous, waste water from the slags of Alaunhütte II, while the Teufelsbach collects that from the heaps of Alaunhütte I (on Pützchens Chaussee); In addition, the Alaunbach absorbs the seepage water, which is reddish-brown due to iron compounds and which escaped from the alumina and lignite deposits that were also mined there in the past[4]. The area from Hardtweiherstraße is still (partially) visible from this sewage system.

Zuflüsse Teufelsbach (links), 0,8 km

== See also ==
- List of rivers of North Rhine-Westphalia
