= Schwanebeck =

- Town
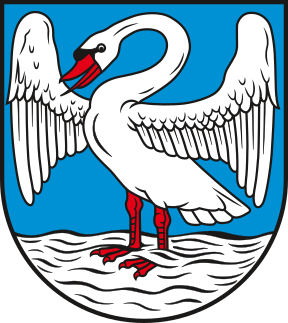
- Coat of arms

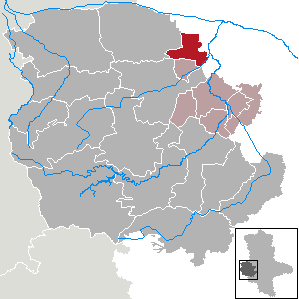
- Location of Schwanebeck within Harz district
- Interactive map of Schwanebeck
- Location within Germany Location within Saxony-Anhalt
- Coordinates: 51°58′3″N 11°7′15″E
- Country: Germany
- State: Saxony-Anhalt
- District: Harz
- Municipal assoc.: Vorharz

Government
  - Mayor (2022–29): Benno Liebner

Area
  - Total: 32.66 km^{2} (12.61 sq mi)
- Elevation: 109 m (358 ft)

Population (2025-12-31)
  - Total: 2,328
  - Density: 71.28/km^{2} (184.6/sq mi)
- Time zone: UTC+01:00 (CET)
  - Summer (DST): UTC+02:00 (CEST)
- Postal codes: 39397
- Dialling codes: 039424
- Vehicle registration: HZ
- Website: www.stadt-schwanebeck.de

Schwanebeck (German pronunciation: [ˈʃvaːnəbɛk]) is a small town in the district of Harz, in Saxony-Anhalt, Germany. It is part of the Verbandsgemeinde ("collective municipality") Vorharz.

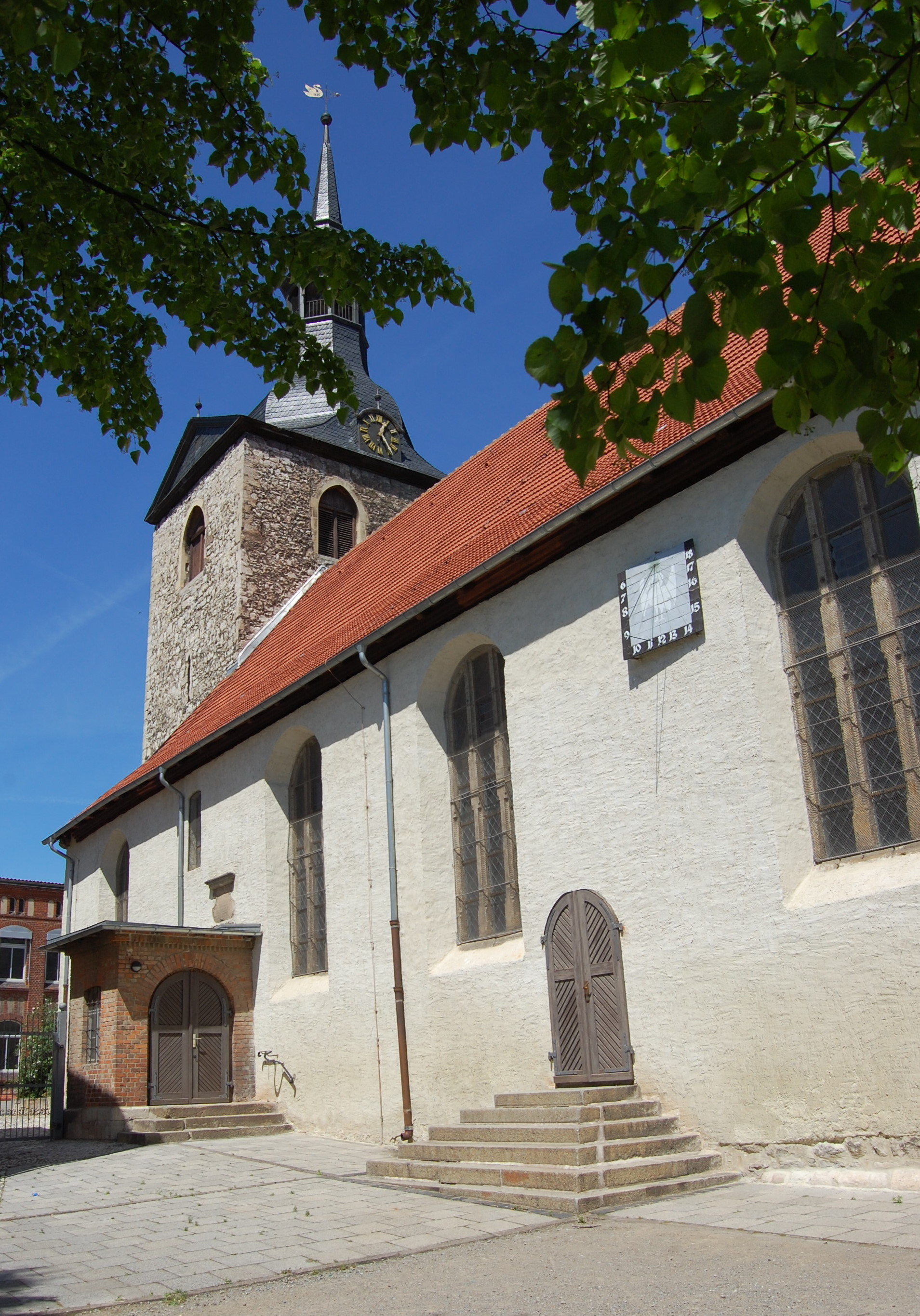
St Peter's Church

The municipal area is situated northeast of Halberstadt, on the Bundesstraße 245 highway to Hamersleben. Since 2010, it also comprises the former municipality of Nienhagen.

== History ==
A Saxon settlement at the site was first mentioned in a 1062 deed. The area belonged to the Prince-Bishopric of Halberstadt, which after the Protestant Reformation was finally secularised according to the 1648 Peace of Westphalia.

The Schwanebeck citizens received town privileges in 1270. Bishop Albert II of Halberstadt had a chapel erected in 1334 which soon became a major pilgrimage site. The present parish church dedicated to St Peter was erected about 1345 and rebuilt in a Baroque style in the late 17th century. With the Brandenburg Principality of Halberstadt, Schwanebeck was incorporated into the Prussian Province of Saxony by 1817.

== Notable people ==
- Detlef Enge (1952–2025), football player
