= Nienhagen, Saxony-Anhalt =

Nienhagen
- Stadtteil of Schwanebeck
- Interactive map of Nienhagen
- Location within Germany Location within Saxony-Anhalt
- Coordinates: 51°57′N 11°10′E
- Country: Germany
- State: Saxony-Anhalt
- District: Harz
- Town: Schwanebeck

Area
  - Total: 6.73 km^{2} (2.60 sq mi)
- Elevation: 94 m (308 ft)

Population (2006-12-31)
  - Total: 449
  - Density: 66.7/km^{2} (173/sq mi)
- Time zone: UTC+01:00 (CET)
  - Summer (DST): UTC+02:00 (CEST)
- Postal codes: 39397
- Dialling codes: 039403

Nienhagen (German pronunciation: [niːnˈhaːɡn̩]) is a village and a former municipality in the district of Harz, in Saxony-Anhalt, Germany.

Since 1 January 2010, it is part of the town Schwanebeck.
