= Teufelsbach (Müggenbach) =

River in Germany

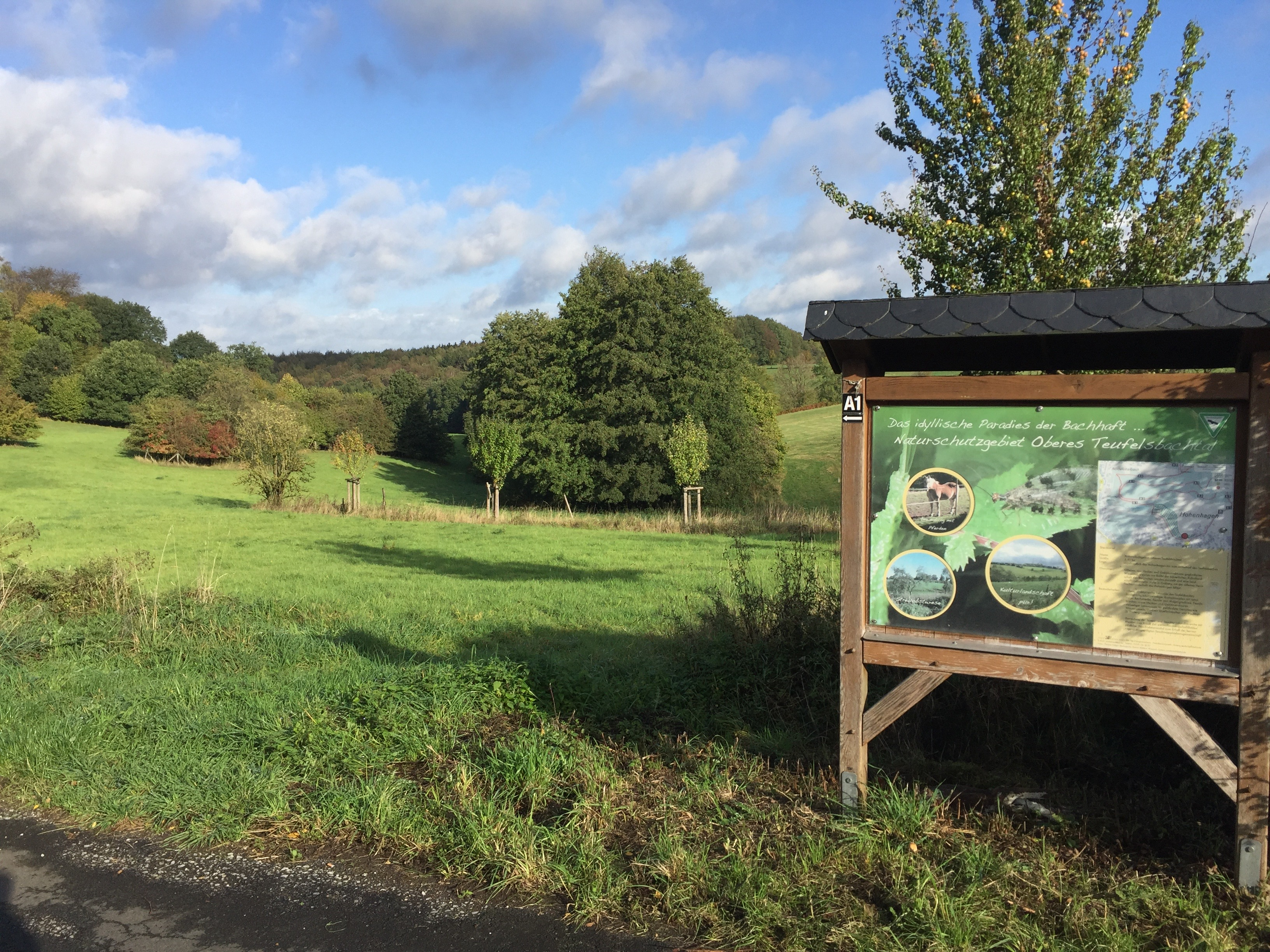

Location
- Country: Germany
- State: North Rhine-Westphalia

Physical characteristics
- Mouth
  - location: Müggenbach
  - coordinates: 51.1880°N 7.1979°E

Basin features
- Progression: Müggenbach→ Morsbach→ Wupper→ Rhine→ North Sea

Teufelsbach is a small river of North Rhine-Westphalia, Germany. It is 1.6 km (1.0 mi) long and is a right tributary of the Müggenbach, which is itself a tributary of the Morsbach.

== See also ==
- List of rivers of North Rhine-Westphalia
