= Wedderstedt =

- Ortsteil of Selke-Aue
- Interactive map of Wedderstedt
- Location within Germany Location within Saxony-Anhalt
- Coordinates: 51°50′21″N 11°14′39″E
- Country: Germany
- State: Saxony-Anhalt
- District: Harz
- Municipality: Selke-Aue

Area
  - Total: 7.69 km^{2} (2.97 sq mi)
- Elevation: 110 m (360 ft)

Population (2020)
  - Total: 400
  - Density: 52/km^{2} (130/sq mi)
- Time zone: UTC+01:00 (CET)
  - Summer (DST): UTC+02:00 (CEST)
- Postal codes: 06458
- Vehicle registration: HZ

Wedderstedt (German pronunciation: [ˈvɛdɐʃtɛt]) is a village and a former municipality in the district of Harz, in Saxony-Anhalt, Germany. Since 1 January 2010, it is part of the municipality Selke-Aue.
