= Ditfurt =

- Municipality
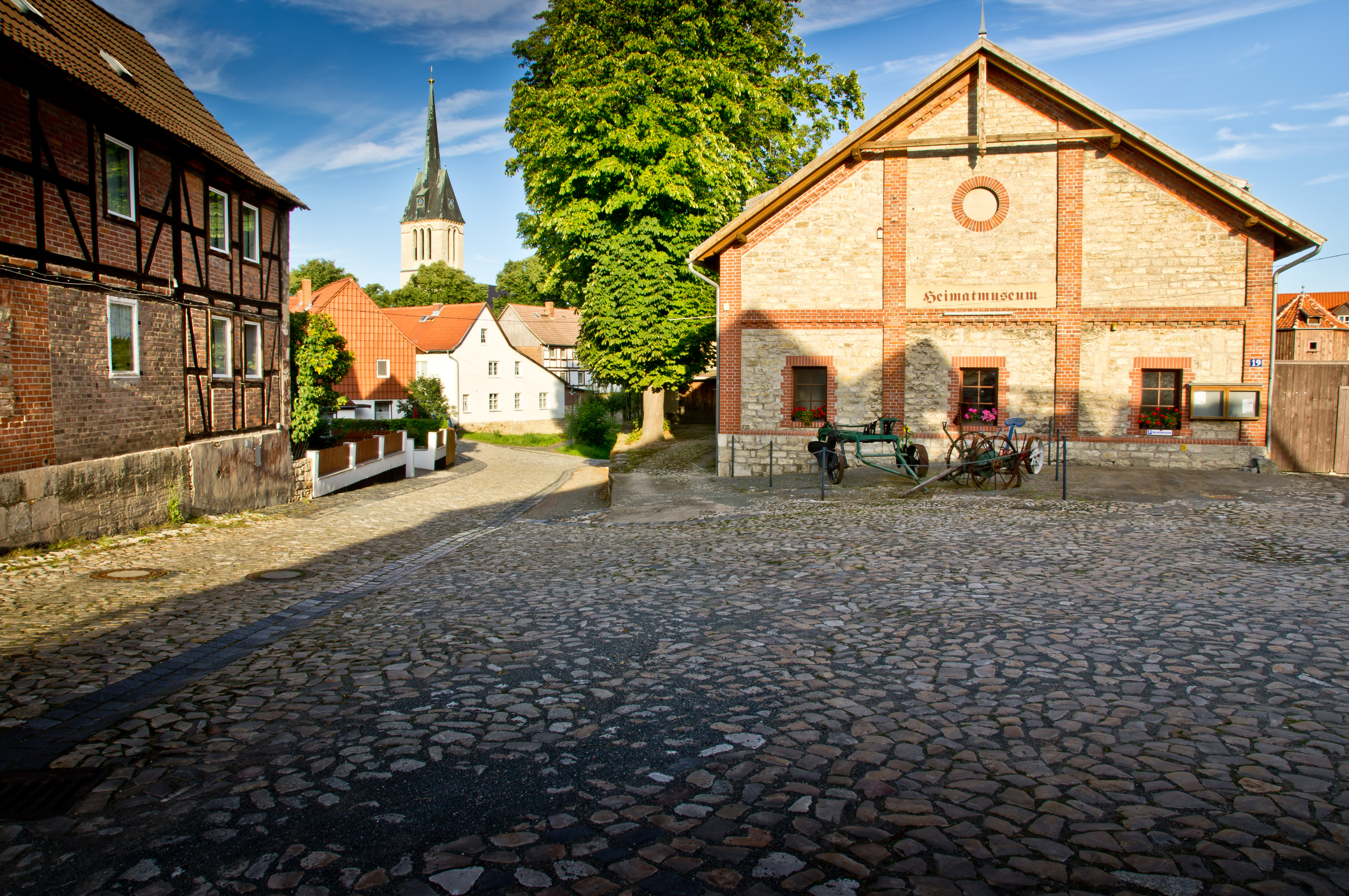
- Local history museum and the Church of Saint Boniface

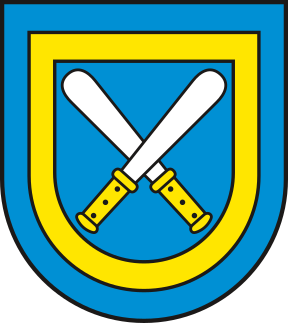
- Coat of arms

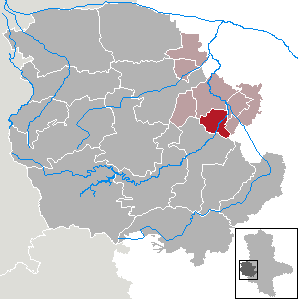
- Location of Ditfurt within Harz district
- Interactive map of Ditfurt
- Location within Germany Location within Saxony-Anhalt
- Coordinates: 51°49′52″N 11°12′10″E
- Country: Germany
- State: Saxony-Anhalt
- District: Harz
- Municipal assoc.: Vorharz

Government
  - Mayor (2017–24): Matthias Hellmann

Area
  - Total: 23.72 km^{2} (9.16 sq mi)
- Elevation: 125 m (410 ft)

Population (2025-12-31)
  - Total: 1,336
  - Density: 56.32/km^{2} (145.9/sq mi)
- Time zone: UTC+01:00 (CET)
  - Summer (DST): UTC+02:00 (CEST)
- Postal codes: 06484
- Dialling codes: 03946
- Vehicle registration: HZ

Ditfurt is a municipality in the district of Harz, Saxony-Anhalt, Germany.

== Sites of interest ==
Ditfurt's history museum has crafts and information about the history of the village, it also displays the artifacts from the village's agricultural past.
