= Groß Quenstedt =

- Municipality
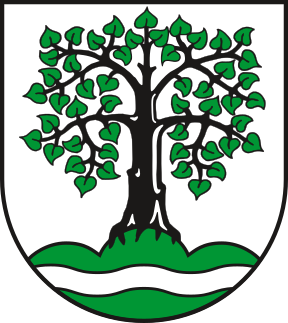
- Coat of arms

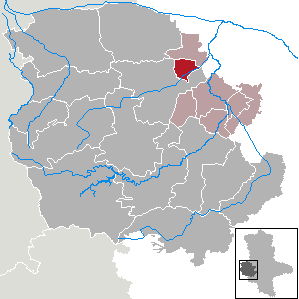
- Location of Groß Quenstedt within Harz district
- Interactive map of Groß Quenstedt
- Location within Germany Location within Saxony-Anhalt
- Coordinates: 51°55′41″N 11°6′29″E
- Country: Germany
- State: Saxony-Anhalt
- District: Harz
- Municipal assoc.: Vorharz

Government
  - Mayor (2018–25): Meinhardt Stadler

Area
  - Total: 15.65 km^{2} (6.04 sq mi)
- Elevation: 95 m (312 ft)

Population (2025-12-31)
  - Total: 823
  - Density: 52.6/km^{2} (136/sq mi)
- Time zone: UTC+01:00 (CET)
  - Summer (DST): UTC+02:00 (CEST)
- Postal codes: 38822
- Dialling codes: 039424
- Vehicle registration: HZ
- Website: www.bode-holtemme.de

Groß Quenstedt is a municipality in the district of Harz, in Saxony-Anhalt, Germany.
