= Harsleben =

- Municipality
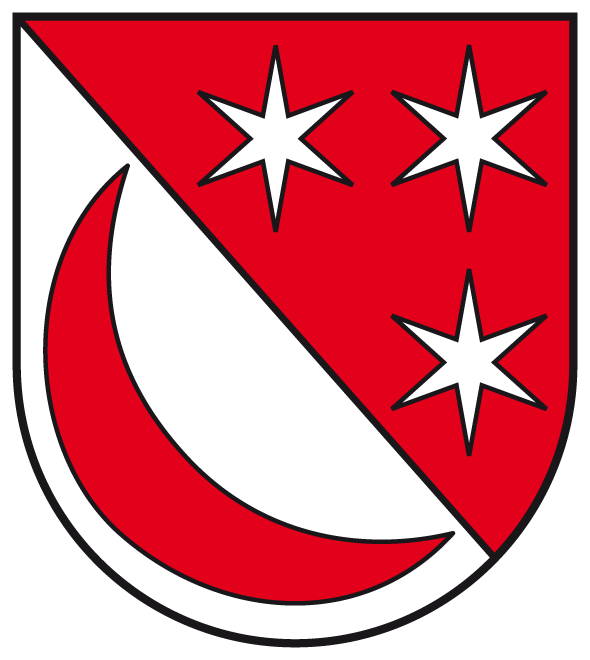
- Coat of arms

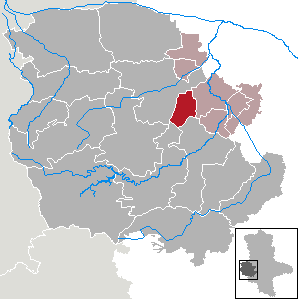
- Location of Harsleben within Harz district
- Interactive map of Harsleben
- Location within Germany Location within Saxony-Anhalt
- Coordinates: 51°52′0″N 11°5′35″E
- Country: Germany
- State: Saxony-Anhalt
- District: Harz
- Municipal assoc.: Vorharz

Government
  - Mayor (2022–29): Christel Bischoff

Area
  - Total: 27.86 km^{2} (10.76 sq mi)
- Elevation: 123 m (404 ft)

Population (2025-12-31)
  - Total: 2,112
  - Density: 75.81/km^{2} (196.3/sq mi)
- Time zone: UTC+01:00 (CET)
  - Summer (DST): UTC+02:00 (CEST)
- Postal codes: 38829
- Dialling codes: 03941
- Vehicle registration: HZ
- Website: www.bode-holtemme.de

Harsleben (German pronunciation: [ˈhaʁsˌleːbn̩]; Low German: Harschlewe) is a municipality in the district of Harz, in Saxony-Anhalt, Germany.
