= Bode (river) =

River in Germany

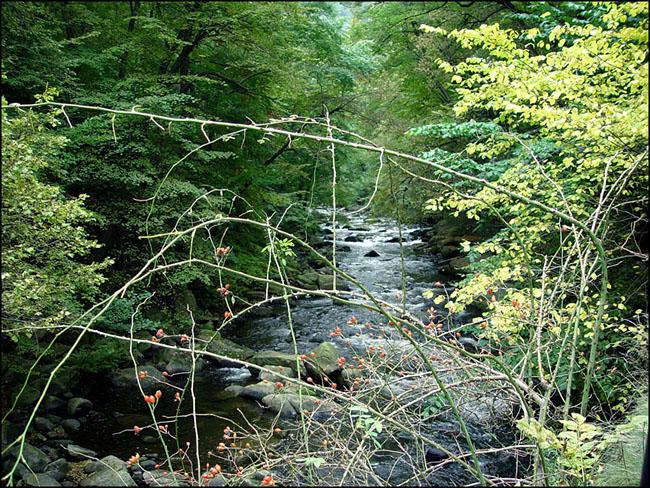
- The upper course of the Bode near Treseburg as it enters the Bode Gorge Nature Reserve

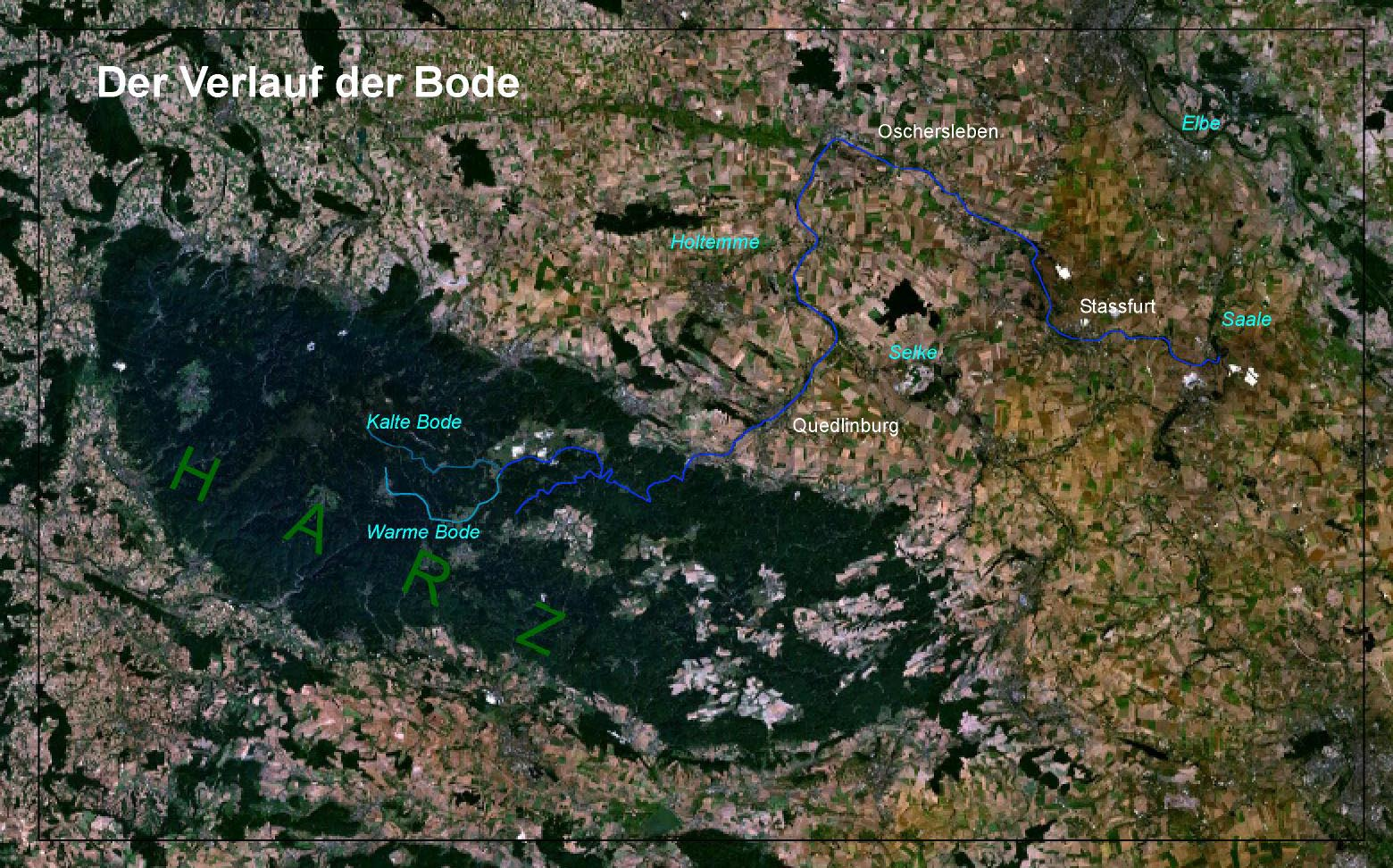
- Das Flusssystem der Bode

Location
- Country: Germany
- State: Saxony-Anhalt

Physical characteristics
- Source
  - location: Harz
  - elevation: 860 metres (2,820 ft)
- Mouth
  - location: Saale
  - coordinates: 51°50′27″N 11°46′17″E
  - elevation: 80 metres (260 ft)
- Length: 169 kilometres (105 mi)
- Basin size: c. 3,000 km^{2} (1,200 sq mi)
- Discharge
  - average: 3.5 m^{3}/s (120 cu ft/s)

Basin features
- Progression: Saale→ Elbe→ North Sea
- Tributaries
  - left: Holtemme
  - right: Rappbode, Luppbode, Selke
- Towns and villages: Quedlinburg, Oschersleben, Staßfurt, Thale, Wegeleben, Gröningen

The Bode (German pronunciation: [ˈboːdə]) is a river in the German state of Saxony-Anhalt, a left tributary of the Saale. It rises in the Harz mountains and drains them in a northerly direction. After 169 kilometres (105 mi) it discharges into the Saale at Nienburg. The river is named after a legendary giant, the wild, rampaging, Bohemian, Prince Bodo, who, according to the Rosstrappe legend, changed into a marauding dog that guarded the crown of Princess Brunhilde in the Kronensumpf ("crown marsh") in the present-day Bode Gorge (German: Bodetal). The gorge is the narrow section of the Bode valley between Treseburg and Thale.

== The Bodo legend ==
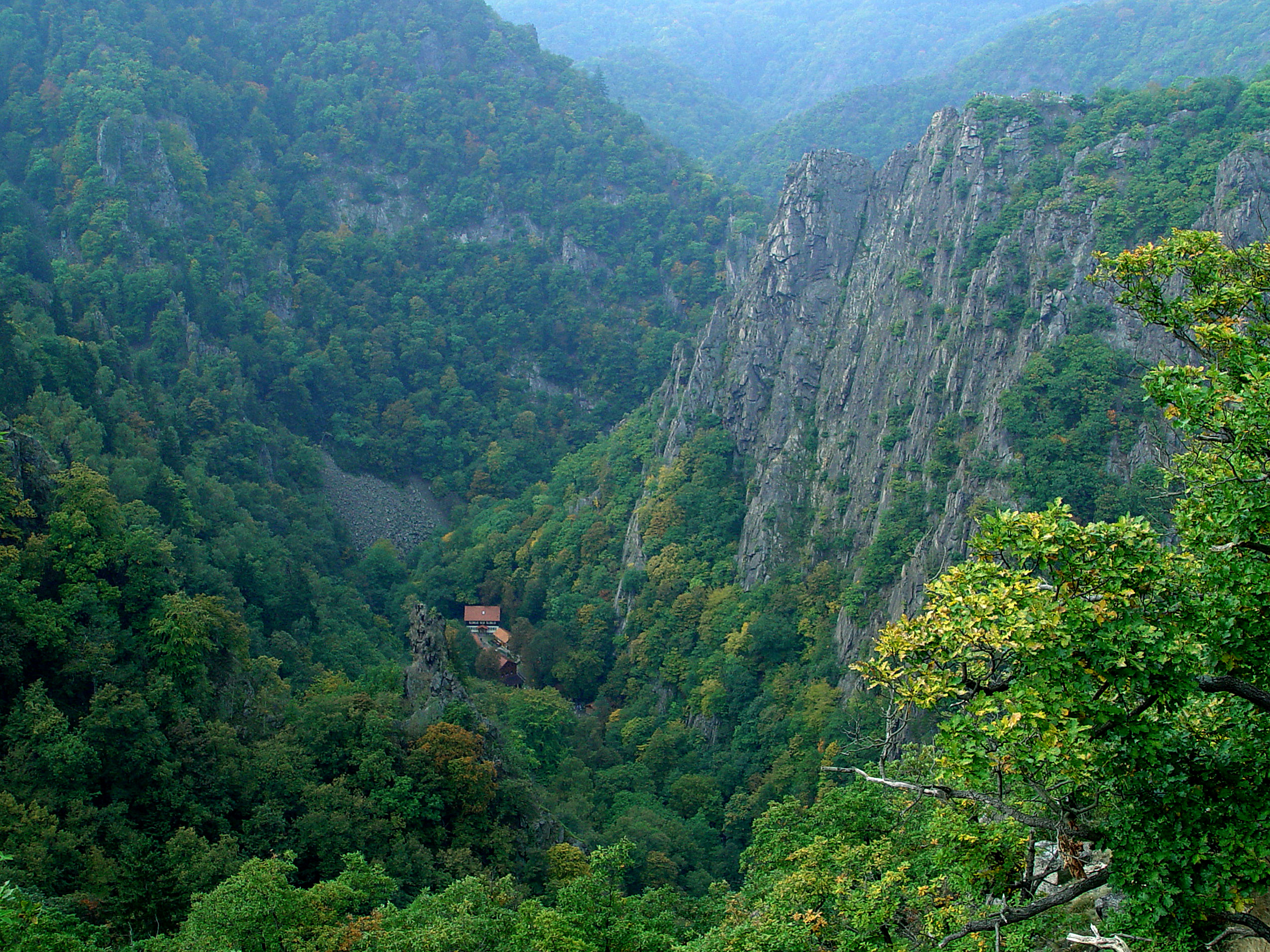
Bode Gorge, view from the Hexentanzplatz plateau near Thale

According to tradition, there was once a giant called Bodo who came from Thuringia, in modern-day central Germany, to pursue Brunhilde, the king's beautiful daughter, whom he wanted to marry against her will. Brunhilde fled on a white stallion (Ross), but they suddenly came to a deep ravine. With one bold leap she reached the rocks on the far side, but her pursuer fell into the abyss. According to legend, the hoofprint of her horse can still be seen today as the so-called Rosstrappe. Meanwhile, Bodo was turned into a dog. As her horse leapt the gorge, however, the princess lost her golden crown, which was now guarded by the dog Bodo in the valley of the river. The river was given the name Bode after the giant Bodo who was now under a spell.

== Geography ==
=== Source and catchment areas ===
The Bode is heavily divided in its source region on the Brocken, the highest peak in the Harz, but its two most important source streams are the:

- Kalte Bode, 17 kilometres (11 mi) long, which rises at Bodesprung at 860 m above sea level (NN)
- Warme Bode, 23 kilometres (14 mi) long, with its headstream, the Bodebruch

The two rivers, which actually have a temperature difference of 2 °C, merge not far from the Königsburg Ruins immediately before flowing into the Königshütte Dam (a feeder dam or Überleitungssperre).

Other tributaries of the Bode include the Rappbode and the Luppbode. The Rappbode is impounded near Wendefurth by the Rappbode Dam. At the northern end of this reservoir, the Rappbode joins the Bode, which is impounded here by the Wendefurth Dam. Other tributaries of the Bode are the Goldbach, the Holtemme and the Selke.

=== Waterfalls ===
The waterfalls in the Harz are not high. The Upper Bode Falls (Obere Bode-Fall) on the Warme Bode are really a fast-flowing stream (Sturzbach) with small steps about 1 metre in height. Likewise the Lower Bode Falls (Untere Bode-Fall) on the Warme Bode is simply ledge of similar height. The Bodekessel in the Bode Gorge is a former step in a large hollow, that was reduced in height in 1798 from 2 metres to 1 metre by explosive. The fourth waterfall is in the Kästental.

== Course ==
The Bode winds its way between Treseburg and Thale through a 10-kilometre (6 mi) long, narrow valley, the Bode Gorge. Today, the valley is a nature reserve. The Bode Gorge and its villages are the primary setting for Theodor Fontane’s novel, Cécile.

The river then crosses the Harz Foreland in a curving and, in places, diked and canalised, course until it discharges into the Saale at Nienburg. Important Bode tributaries are the Selke and the Holtemme. Other towns on the Bode river are Quedlinburg, Wegeleben, Gröningen, Oschersleben, Hadmersleben, Egeln and Staßfurt.

The Bode gorge north of Thale is now a protected area.

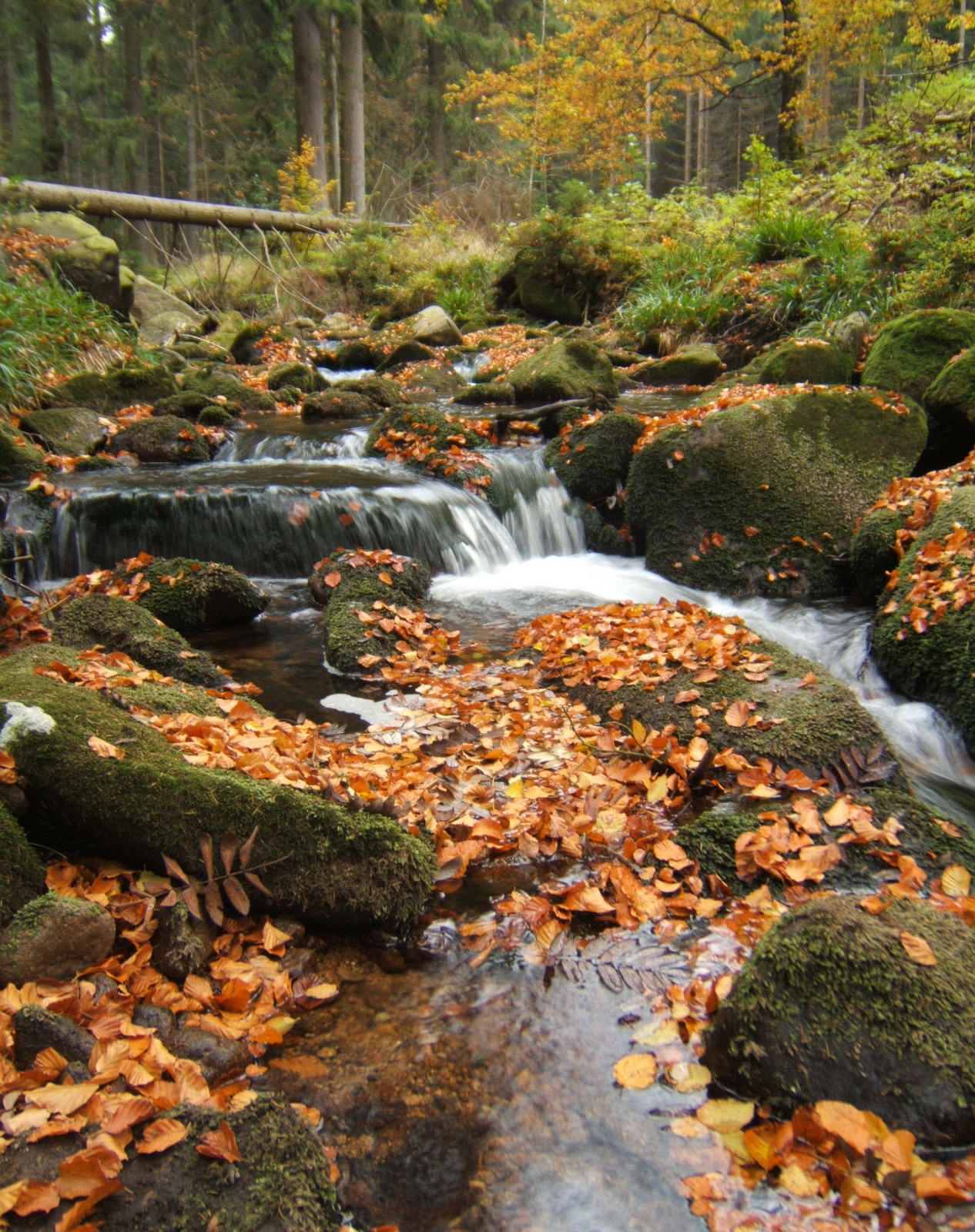
The Große Bode (headstream of the Warme Bode) above Braunlage

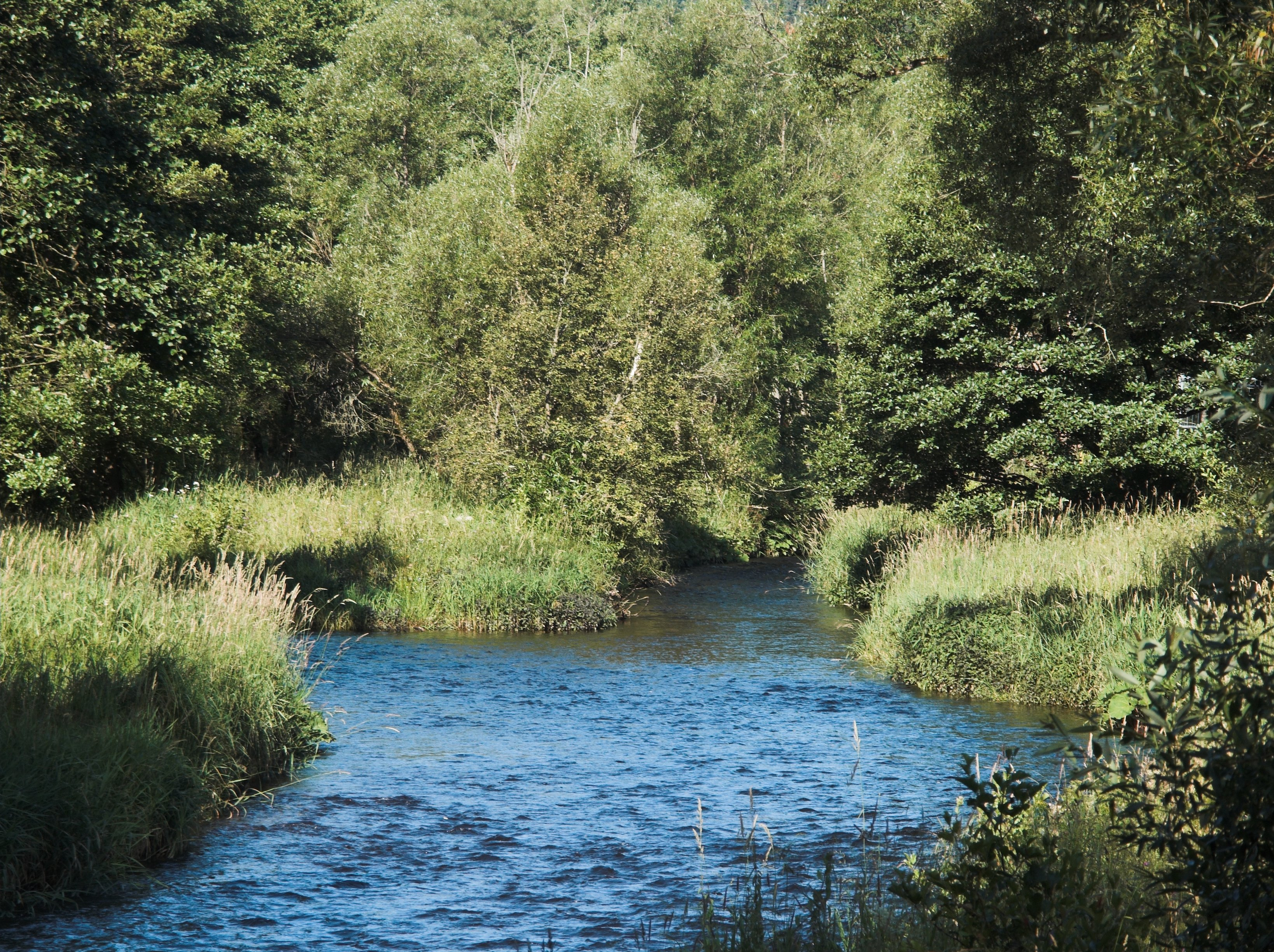
Confluence of the Warme Bode (left) and Kalte (right) Bode near Königshütte

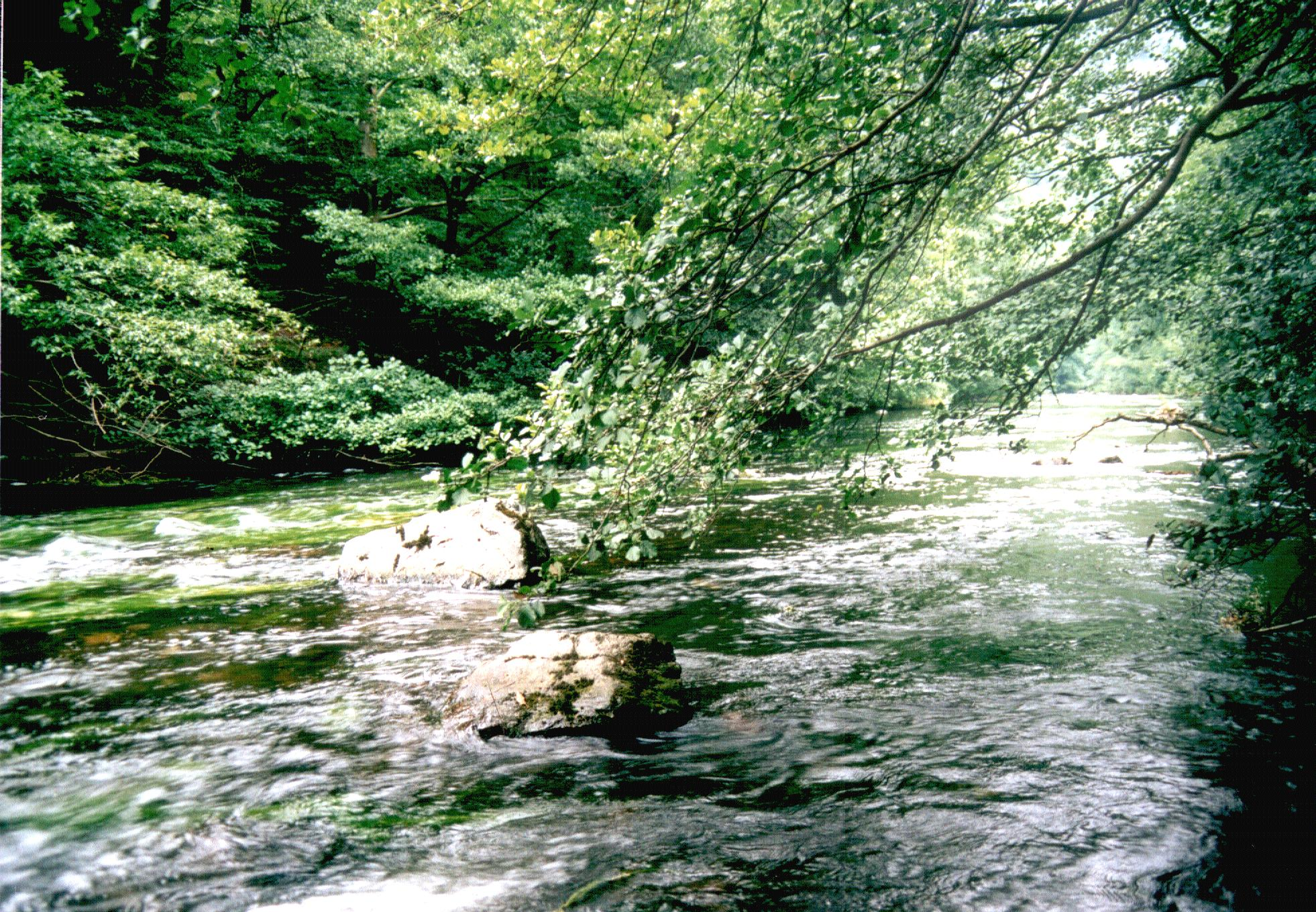
The Wilde Bode

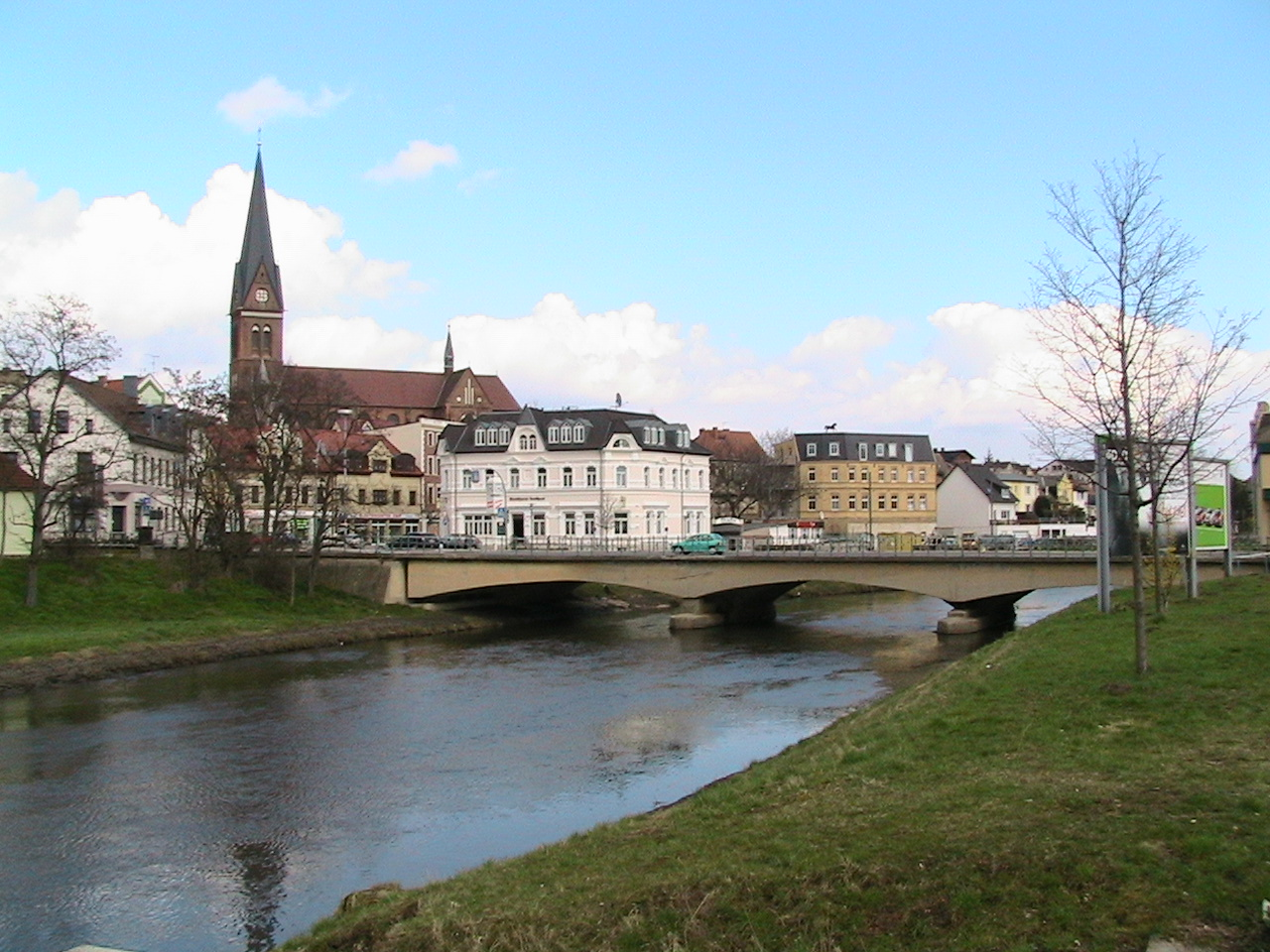
View of the Bode bridge in Staßfurt

=== Catchment area and tributaries ===
The catchment area of the Bode ist about 3000 km² in area. Important tributaries within the Harz are the Rappbode and the Luppbode. The Rappbode is impounded at Wendefurth by the Rappbode Dam. At the northern end of the reservoir the Rappbode joins the Bode which is also impounded by the Wendefurth Dam. Other tributaries are the Goldbach, the Holtemme and the largest one, the Selke.

| Left tributaries | Right tributaries |
| Papenbach (Königshütte); Jordansbach (Quedlinburg); Sülze (Ditfurt); Goldbach (Wegeleben); Holtemme (Nienhagen); Limbach (Krottorf); Großer Graben (Oschersleben); Geesgraben (Andersleben); Sarre (Groß Germersleben); Bisdorfer Röte (Unseburg) | Rappbode (Wendefurth); Luppbode (Treseburg); Wurmbach (Neinstedt); Quarmbach (Quedlinburg); Bicklingsbach (Quedlinburg); Tränkegraben (Ditfurt); Selke (Hedersleben); Ehle (Egeln); Beek (Staßfurt); Liethe (Staßfurt) |
Locations of confluences in brackets

== Dams ==
In a hydrological sense every source stream of the Bode has a specific catchment area in the Harz, that is part of the catchment area of the Bode. The catchment areas of the various reservoirs are as follows: for the Wendefurth Reservoir, 309.2 square kilometres (119.4 mi^{2}), for the Rappbode Pre-Dam and Rappbode Reservoirs, 269 square kilometres (104 mi^{2}), and for the Königshütte Reservoir, 154.2 square kilometres (59.5 mi^{2}). The Mandelholz Dam impounds the water of the Kalte Bode. The total catchment area of the Bode is about 3,000 square kilometres (1,200 mi^{2}).

== History and culture ==
=== Middle Ages ===
In the Early Middle Ages the Bode formed the border between the provinces of the Harzgau in the west and the Schwabengau in the east. The two most important Bode crossings at that time were the settlements of Ditfurt und Gröningen, mentioned frequently in the Fuldau annals.

=== Modern era ===
Heinrich Heine depicts the romantic Bode valley in his 1826 travelogue Die Harzreise:

That dusky beauty, the Bode, did not receive me very graciously, and when I first caught sight of her in the smithy-like darkness of the Rübeland, she seemed even sullen and shrouded herself in a silver-grey veil of rain: but in a rush of love she threw it off when I reached the heights of the Roßtrappe, her face lit up opposite me in sunny splendour, from every aspect breathed a colossal tenderness, and from the conquered breast of rock it issued forth like sighs of passion and languorous sounds of wistfulness.

— Heinrich Heine, Die Harzreise (1826)

=== Flood and low water ===
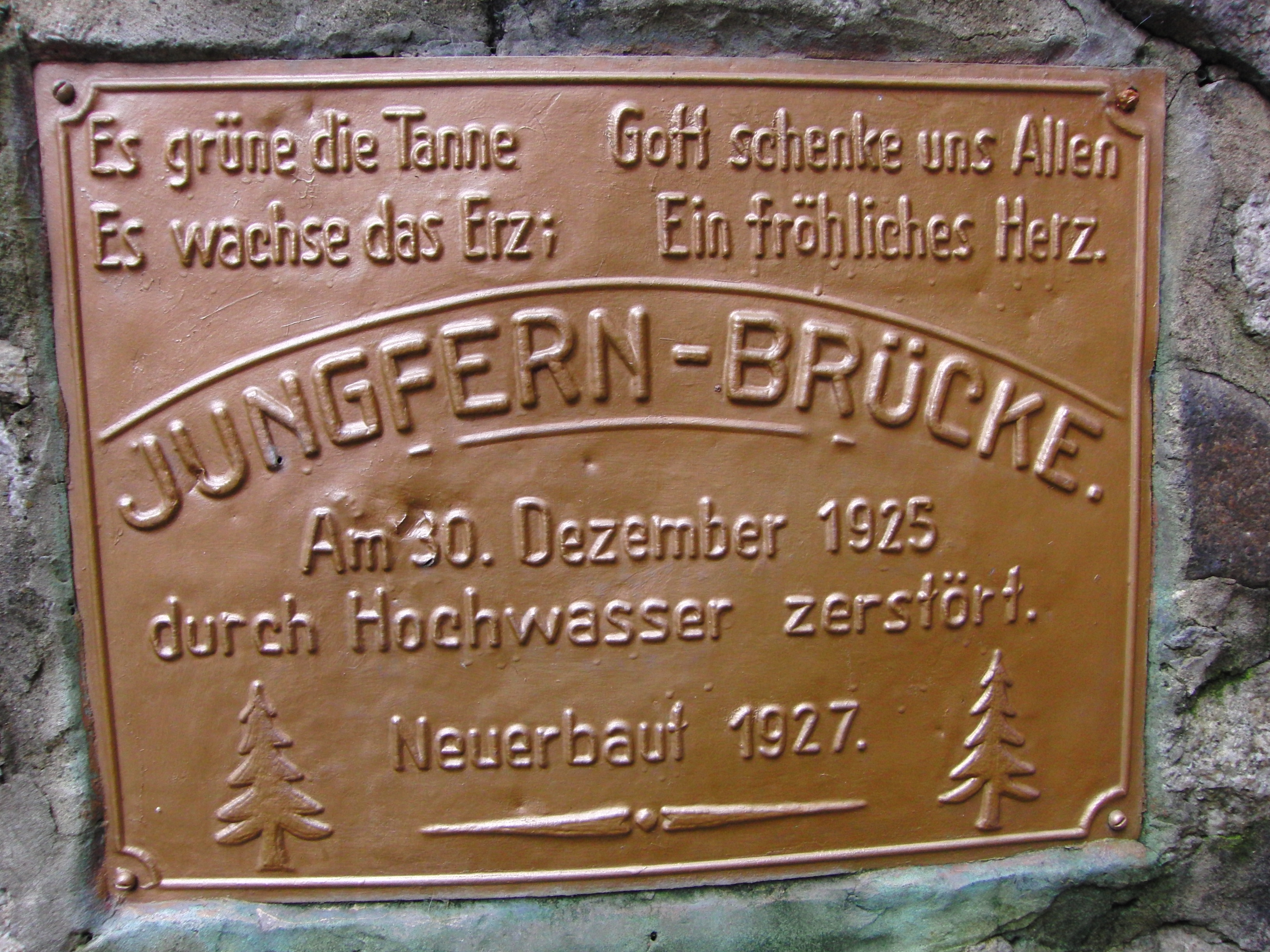
Board by the Jungfern Bridge built in 1927 after its predecessor was destroyed on 30 December 1925

The 'most devastating' floods from the Bode occurred in the years 1539, 1667, 1730, 1740, 1772 and especially at Christmas in 1925. Only on the completion of the Rappbode Dam in 1959 could the risk of flooding be eliminated. The water quantities in the Bode can vary significantly: during the New Year flooding in 1925 a discharge of 350 cubic metres per second (12,000 cu ft/s) was recorded, whereas in the following summer of 1926 it fell to just 0.35 cubic metres per second (12 cu ft/s).

== See also ==
- List of rivers of Saxony-Anhalt

== Sources ==
- Monika Schönau/Edmund Werner: Die Bode: ein Fluss führt Hochwasser! Sachsen-Anhalt, Staatliches Amt für Umweltschutz Magdeburg, Magdeburg 2000.
