= Harz (district) =

Coordinates: 51°52′N 10°53′E

- District
- Flag Coat of arms
- Country: Germany
- State: Saxony-Anhalt
- Capital: Halberstadt

Government
  - District admin.: Thomas Balcerowski (CDU)

Area
  - Total: 2,104.9 km^{2} (812.7 sq mi)

Population (31 December 2024)
  - Total: 205,484
  - Density: 98/km^{2} (250/sq mi)
- Time zone: UTC+01:00 (CET)
  - Summer (DST): UTC+02:00 (CEST)
- Vehicle registration: HZ, HBS, QLB, WR
- Website: www.kreis-hz.de

Harz is a district in Saxony-Anhalt, Germany. Its area is 2,104.9 km^{2} (812.7 sq mi).

== History ==
The district was established by merging the former districts of Halberstadt, Wernigerode and Quedlinburg as well as the city of Falkenstein (from the district of Aschersleben-Staßfurt) as part of the reform of 2007.

== Towns and municipalities ==
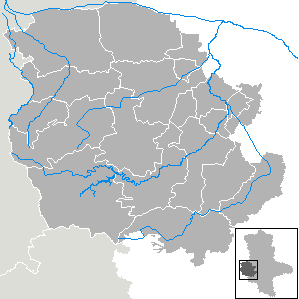
Clickable map of towns and municipalities in the district

The district Harz consists of the following subdivisions:

| Free towns | Free municipalities | Verbandsgemeinde |
|---|---|---|
| 1. Ballenstedt; 2. Blankenburg am Harz; 3. Falkenstein; 4. Halberstadt; 5. Harzgerode; 6. Ilsenburg; 7. Oberharz am Brocken; 8. Osterwieck; 9. Quedlinburg; 10. Thale; 11. Wernigerode | 1. Huy; 2. Nordharz | Vorharz: 1. Ditfurt; 2. Groß Quenstedt; 3. Harsleben; 4. Hedersleben; 5. Schwanebeck^{2}; 6. Selke-Aue; 7. Wegeleben^{1, 2} |
^{1}seat of the Verbandsgemeinde; ^{2}town

== See also ==
- Ilsenburg (Verwaltungsgemeinschaft)
