= Simon Bingelhelm =

German robber and serial killer

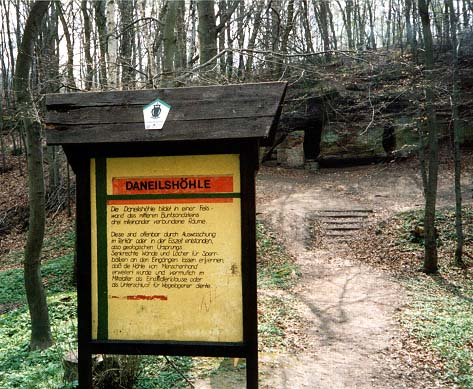
Billboard at Daneil's Cave

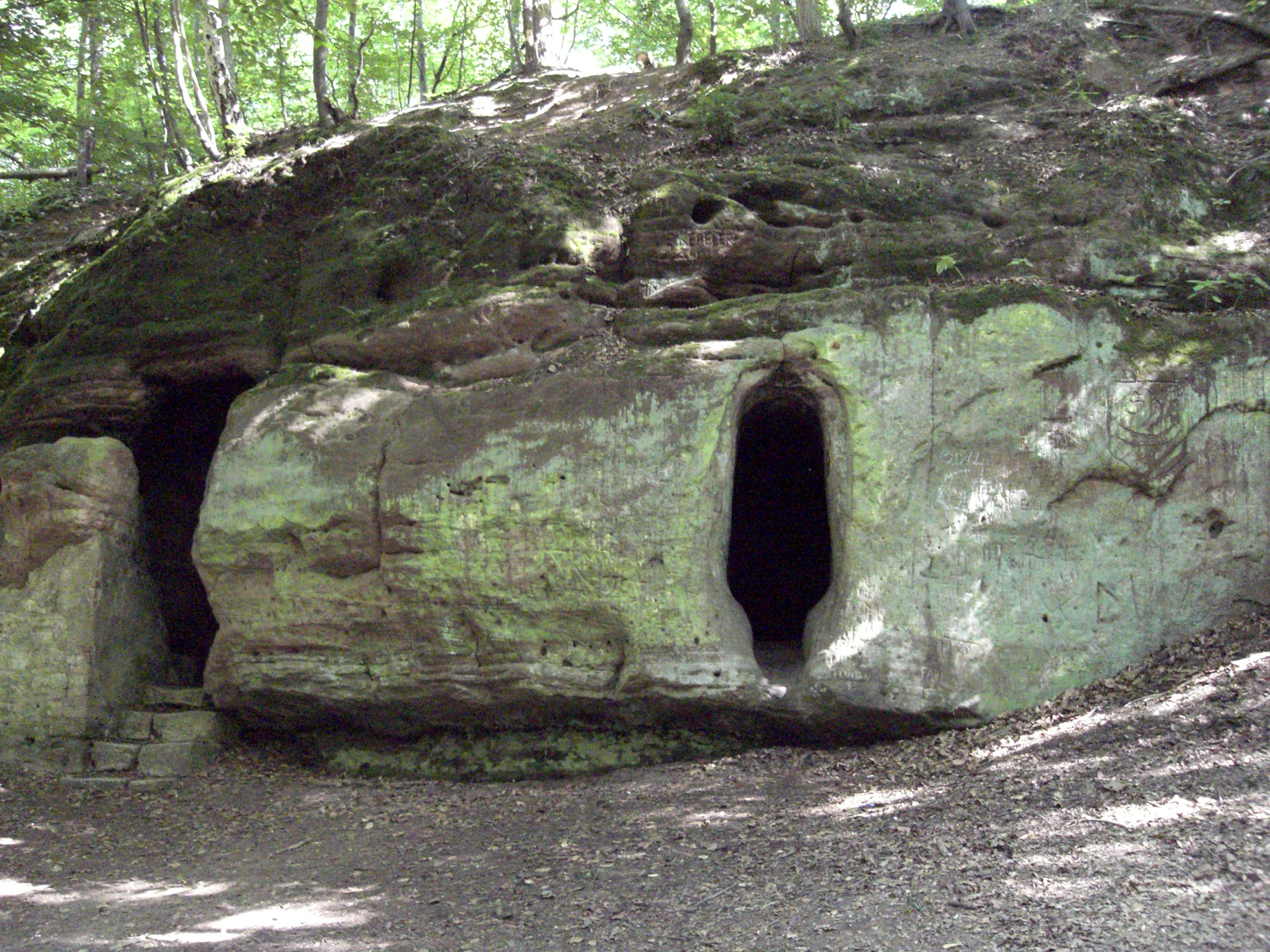
Entrance to Daneil's Cave where, according to local lore, Bingelhelm robbed and murdered some of his victims

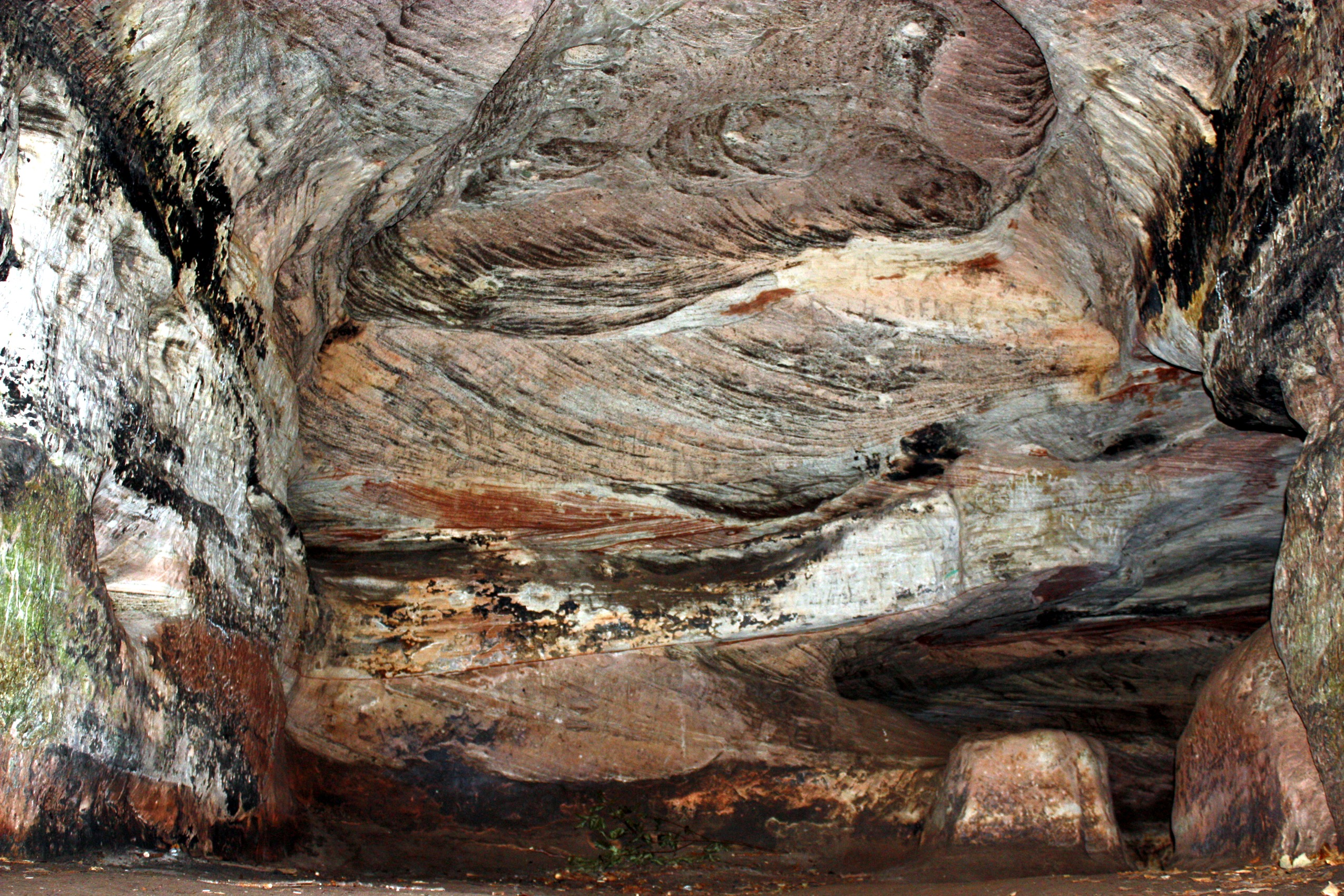
Cave interior

Simon Bingelhelm (1565 – 2 June 1600), called The Thousand Devils of Halberstadt, was a German robber and serial killer. He was executed for multiple crimes in an area now known as Saxony-Anhalt.

== Capture ==
In the spring of 1600, a man who was believed to be the "Thousand Devils of Halberstadt" was arrested. He was brought to Gröningen, the location of the Diocese of Halberstadt at the time, and which was the residence of Duke Henry Julius of Brunswick. There, the suspect was imprisoned and interrogated, sometimes under torture.

== Confessions ==
In the course of the interrogations, the man stated that his real name was Simon Bingelhelm, and that he was born in Halberstadt.

He confessed to numerous burglaries and theft offences, primarily in Halberstadt, but also in Wernigerode, Reddeber, Falkenstein, Hoym, Aschersleben, Seehausen, Ballenstedt, Eilenstedt, Heimburg, Klein Quenstedt, Westerhausen, Dardesheim, Prenzlau, Salzwedel, Haldensleben, Neuhaldensleben, Calvörde, Derenburg, Herzberg, Oschersleben, Schermcke, Krottorf and Quedlinburg.

He allegedly said that he was the arsonist behind the fire at Drübeck Abbey monastery in 1599, and that he watched the fire from a neighbouring mountain. He had stolen a chalice from Rade Church and had stolen eleven talers from the poverty box of St. George's Church in Derenburg. He broke into the Martinique Church with others and contents of the poor box. In Helmstedt, he stabbed a man for two groschen and a horse near Bernburg. At Benzingerode he killed a young woman, eight days before the Pentecost in 1599. In the forest between Hornburg and Osterwieck, he attempted to rape an 18-year-old woman before killing her.

In the interrogations, the man confessed to a total of 71 crimes, including involvement in 26 murders. Among other things, he is said to have attacked a pregnant woman, whom he killed with his cronies. They supposedly slashed her body to remove her unborn child, from whose entrails he then made candles for his next burglary. He was involved in the robbery and killing of at least five infants.

== Execution ==
On his execution on 2 June 1600, in Gröningen, he was "attacked with pincers for honour, dragged to the town court, then quartered".

== See also ==
- List of German serial killers
