= Adolf Strauss (general) =

German Wehrmacht general (1879–1973)

Adolf Strauß
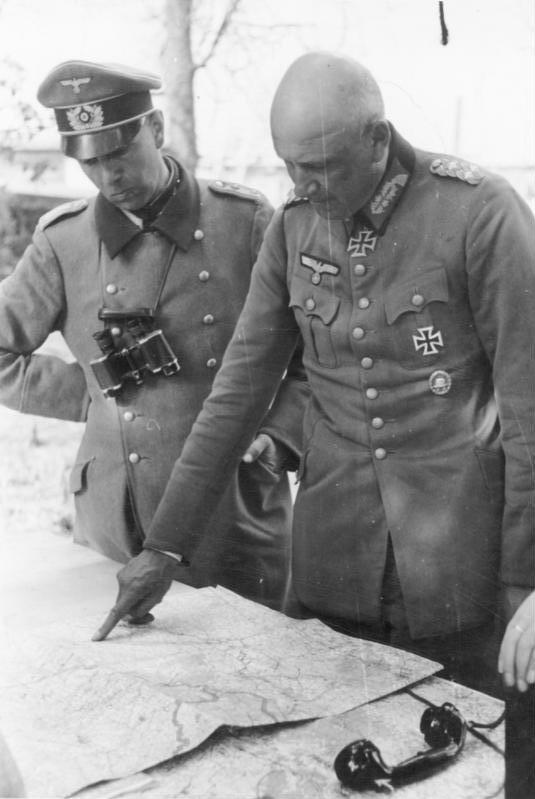
- General Strauß (right), June 1941
- Born: 6 September 1879; Schermcke, Kreis Wanzleben, Regierungsbezirk Magdeburg, Province of Saxony, German Empire
- Died: 20 March 1973 (aged 93); Lübeck, Schleswig-Holstein, West Germany
- Military career
- Allegiance: Kingdom of Prussia; German Empire; Weimar Republic; Nazi Germany
- Branch: Prussian Army; Imperial German Army; Freikorps; Reichsheer; German Army
- Service years: 1898–1945
- Rank: Generaloberst
- Commands: 9th Army
- Conflicts: World War I; World War II; Invasion of Poland; Operation Barbarossa; Battle of Moscow
- Awards: Knight's Cross of the Iron Cross

Adolf Kurt Ernst Strauß (6 September 1879 – 20 March 1973) was a German general who served in the Prussian Army, the Imperial German Army, the Reichswehr, and in the Heer of Nazi Germany's Wehrmacht during World War II.

As commander of the II Army Corps, Strauß participated in the German Invasion of Poland. On 30 May 1940, he was appointed commander of the 9th Army in France. Strauß participated in Operation Barbarossa with Army Group Centre. In January 1942 he was replaced in command of the 9th Army by Walter Model following the initial breakthrough of the Soviet forces during commencement of the Rzhev Battles. He died on 20 March 1973 in Lübeck.

As with all German armies on the Eastern Front, Strauß's 9th Army implemented the criminal Commissar Order.

Adolf Strauß is mentioned by author Sven Hassel in his work of fiction Wheels of Terror.

== Promotions ==
- 15 March 1898 Charakter als Fähnrich (Brevet Officer Cadet)
- 8 October 1898 Fähnrich (Officer Cadet)
- 17 October 1899 Leutnant (2nd Lieutenant)
- 16 June 1910 Oberleutnant (1st Lieutenant)
- 8 October 1914 Hauptmann (Captain)
- 1 February 1924 Major with effect from 1 January 1924 (5)
- 1 May 1929 Oberstleutnant (Lieutenant Colonel)
- 1 April 1932 Oberst (Colonel)
- 1 December 1934 Generalmajor (Major General)
- 20 April 1937 Generalleutnant (Lieutenant General) with effect and Rank Seniority (RDA) from 1 April 1937 (1)
- 10 November 1938 General der Infanterie (General of the Infantry) with effect and Rank Seniority (RDA) from 1 November 1938 (3)
- 19 July 1940 Generaloberst (10)

== Awards and decorations ==
- Iron Cross (1914) 1st and 2nd Class
  - 2nd Class on 22 September 1914
  - 1st Class in October 1915
- Hanseatic Cross, Bremen and Lübeck
- Military Cross of Merit, Principality of Lippe
- Military Merit Cross (Austria), 3rd class with War Decoration (ÖM3K) in May 1918
- Royal House Order of Hohenzollern, Knight's Cross with Swords (HOH3X) in July 1918
- Wound Badge (1918) in Black
- Prussian Long Service Cross for 25 years
- Honour Cross of the World War 1914/1918 with Swords on 20 December 1934
- Wehrmacht Long Service Award, 4th with 1st Class on 2 October 1936
- Hungarian World War Commemorative Medal with Swords on 19 January 1937
- Bulgarian War Commemorative Medal 1915–1918 with Swords
- Repetition Clasp 1939 to the Iron Cross 1914, 2nd and 1st Class
  - 2nd Class on 11 September 1939
  - 1st Class on 22 September 1939
- Winter Battle in the East 1941–42 Medal
- Knight's Cross of the Iron Cross on 27 October 1939 as General der Infanterie and commanding general of the II. Armeekorps
- Mentioned four times in the Wehrmachtbericht on 6 August 1941 (extra), 7 August 1941, 18 October 1941 (extra) and 19 October 1941

== Sources ==
- German Federal Archives: BArch PERS 6/56 and PERS 6/301036

Military offices
Preceded by none	Commander of 22. Infanterie-Division; 15 October 1935 – 10 November 1938	Succeeded by Generalleutnant Hans Graf von Sponeck
Preceded by none	Commander of II. Armeekorps; September 1939 – 30 April 1940	Succeeded by General der Infanterie Carl-Heinrich von Stülpnagel
Preceded by Johannes Blaskowitz	Commander of 9. Armee; 30 May 1940 – 14 January 1942	Succeeded by Walter Model
