= Räuberhöhle =

Räuberhöhle is German for "Robber's Cave" and may refer to:

Caves in Europe:

- Daneil's Cave (Räuberhöhle) in Saxony-Anhalt, Germany
- Idstedt Robber's Cave (Idstedter Räuberhöhle), a passage grave in Schleswig-Holstein, Germany
- Robber's Cave (Mollram Forest) (Räuberhöhle) in Lower Austria
- Robber's Cave (Spital am Semmering) (Räuberhöhle) in the Styria, Austria
- the Berlin-based electropop project of German musician "Krawalla" on Audiolith Records
