= Am Großen Bruch =

- Municipality
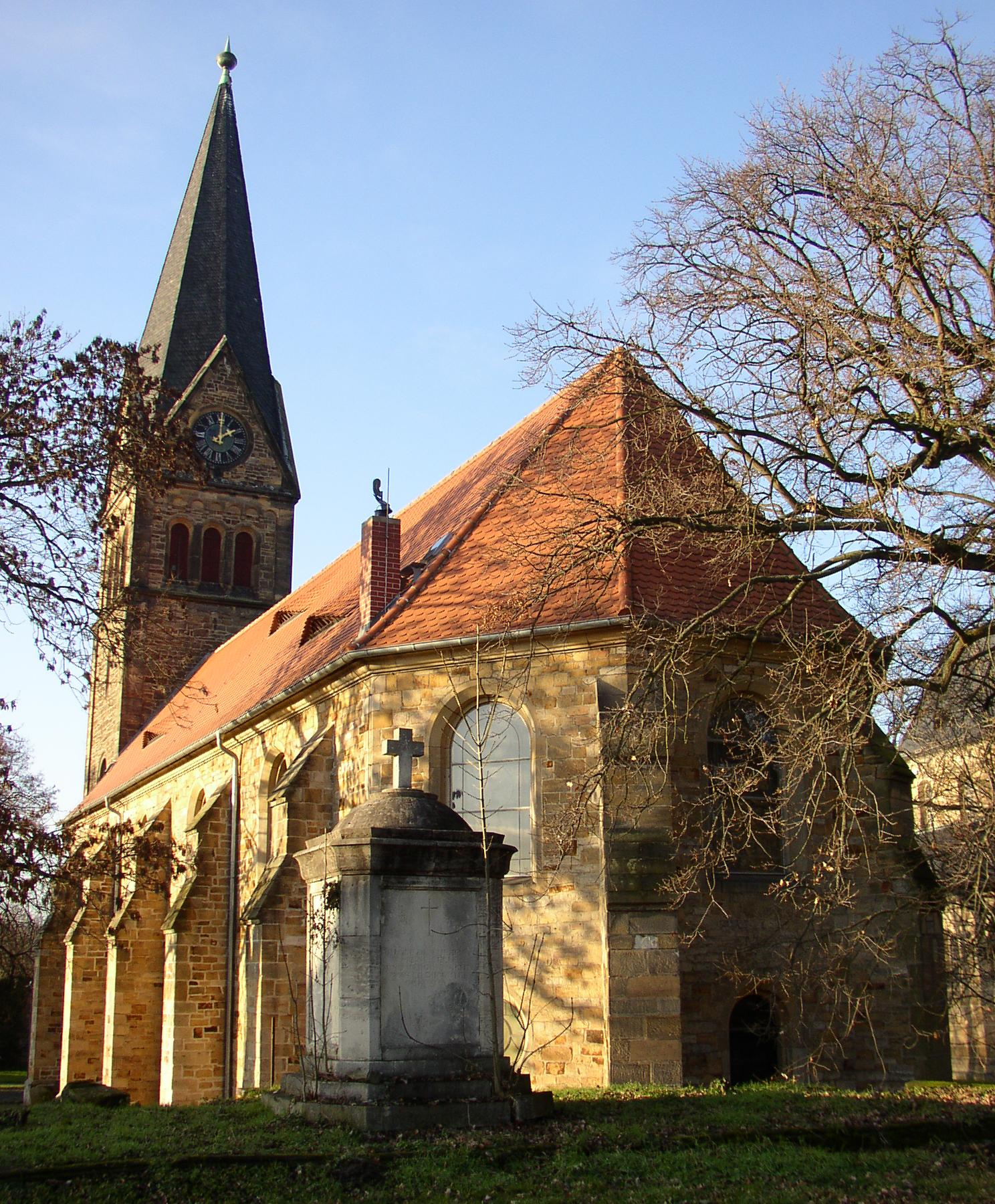
- Hamersleben parish church

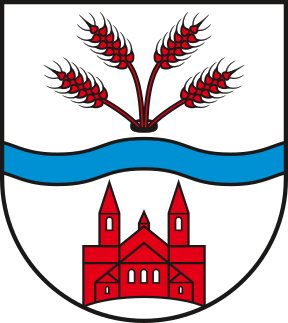
- Coat of arms

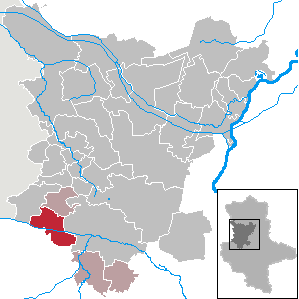
- Location of Am Großen Bruch within Börde district
- Interactive map of Am Großen Bruch
- Location within Germany Location within Saxony-Anhalt
- Coordinates: 52°4′N 11°5′E
- Country: Germany
- State: Saxony-Anhalt
- District: Börde
- Municipal assoc.: Westliche Börde
- Subdivisions: 4

Government
  - Mayor (2018–25): Klaus Graßhoff

Area
  - Total: 50.12 km^{2} (19.35 sq mi)
- Elevation: 99 m (325 ft)

Population (2025-12-31)
  - Total: 1,988
  - Density: 39.66/km^{2} (102.7/sq mi)
- Time zone: UTC+01:00 (CET)
  - Summer (DST): UTC+02:00 (CEST)
- Postal codes: 39393
- Dialling codes: 039401
- Vehicle registration: BK
- Website: www.vgem- westlicheboerde.de

Am Großen Bruch (German pronunciation: [am ˈɡʁoːsn̩ bʁʊx]) is a municipality in the Börde district in Saxony-Anhalt, Germany. It is part of the Verbandsgemeinde ("collective municipality") Westliche Börde. The municipality was created on 1 July 2004 by the merger of the former municipalities Gunsleben, Hamersleben and Neuwegersleben. On 1 January 2010 it absorbed the former municipality Wulferstedt.

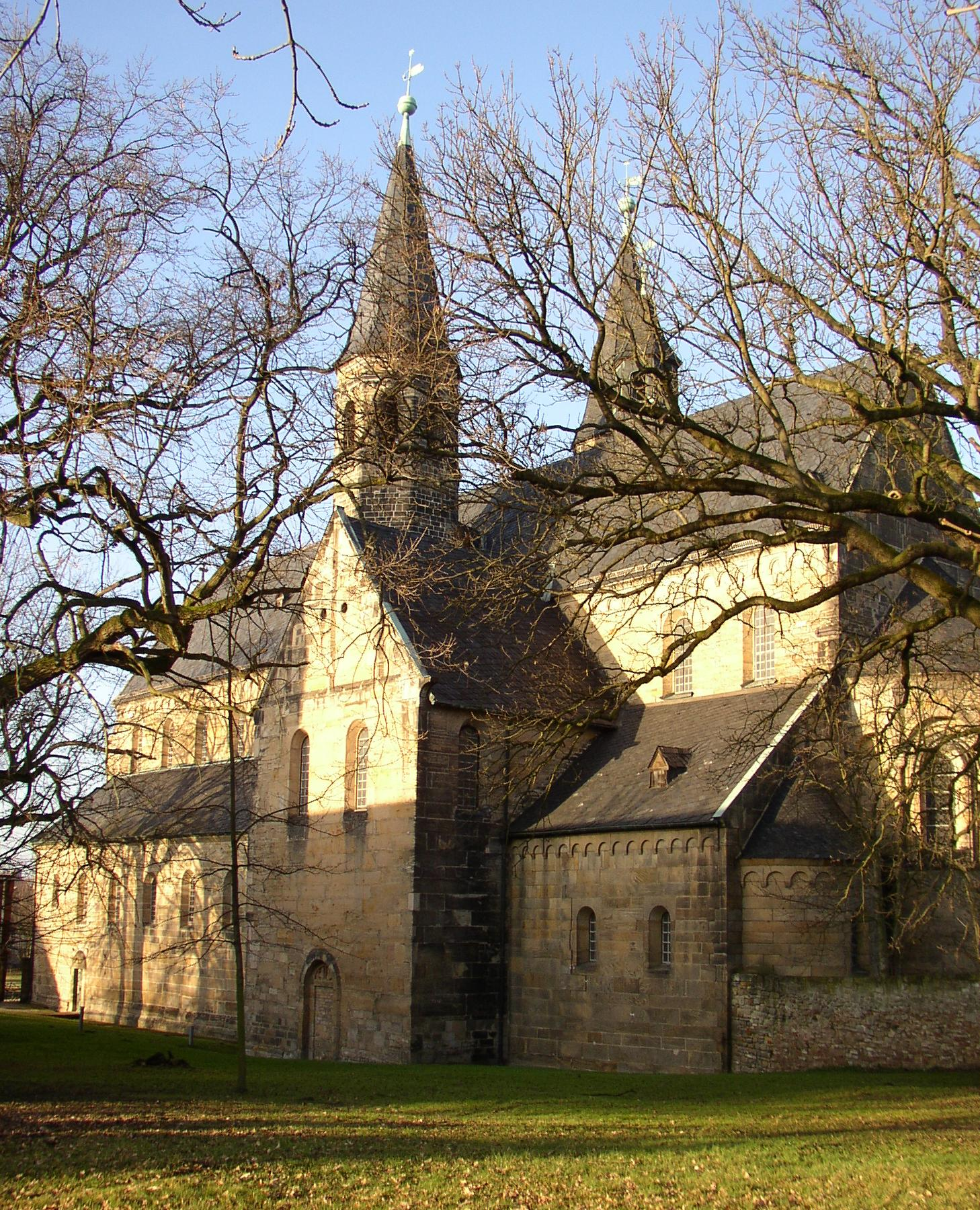
St Pancras monastery church

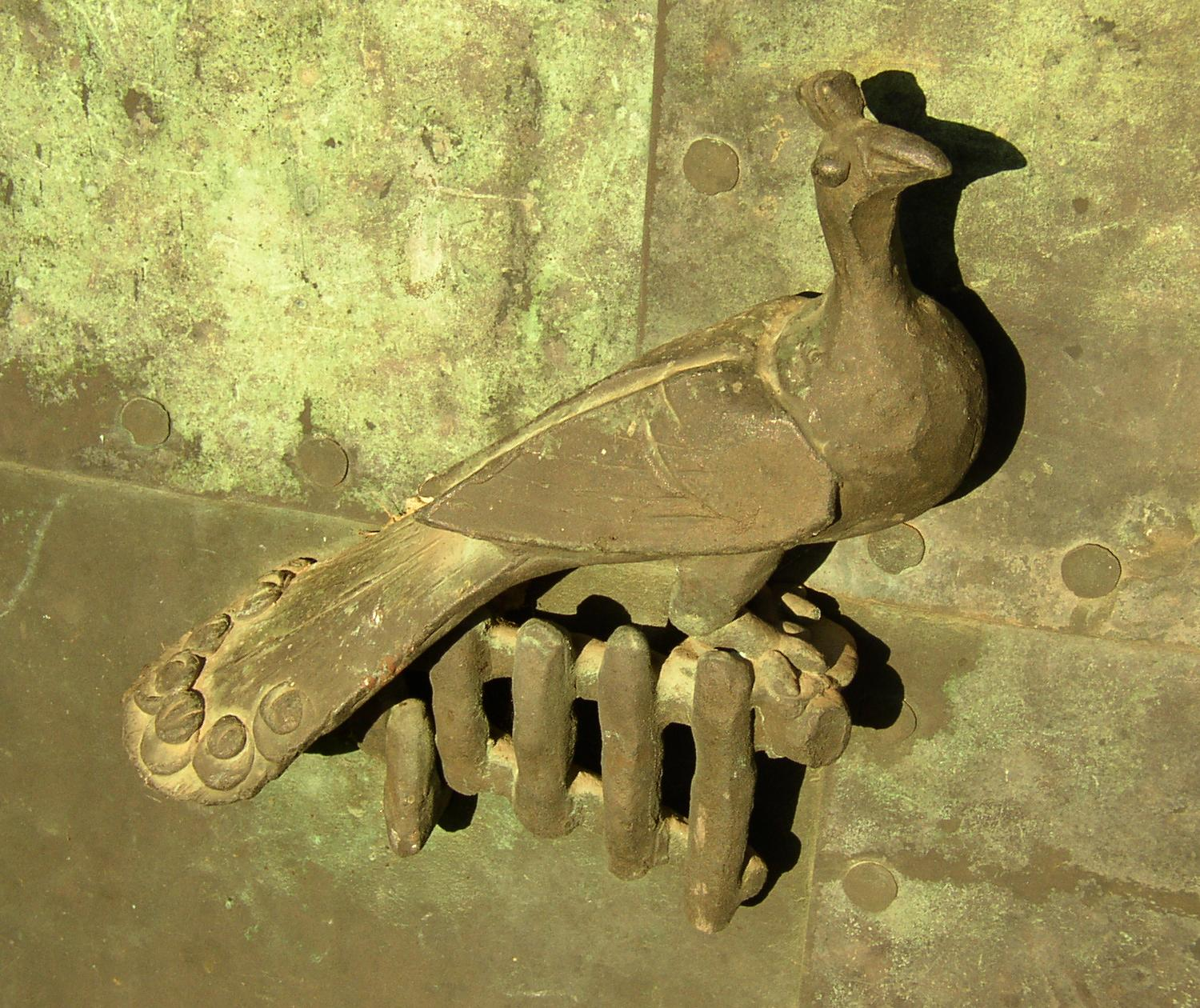
Detail of the church portal

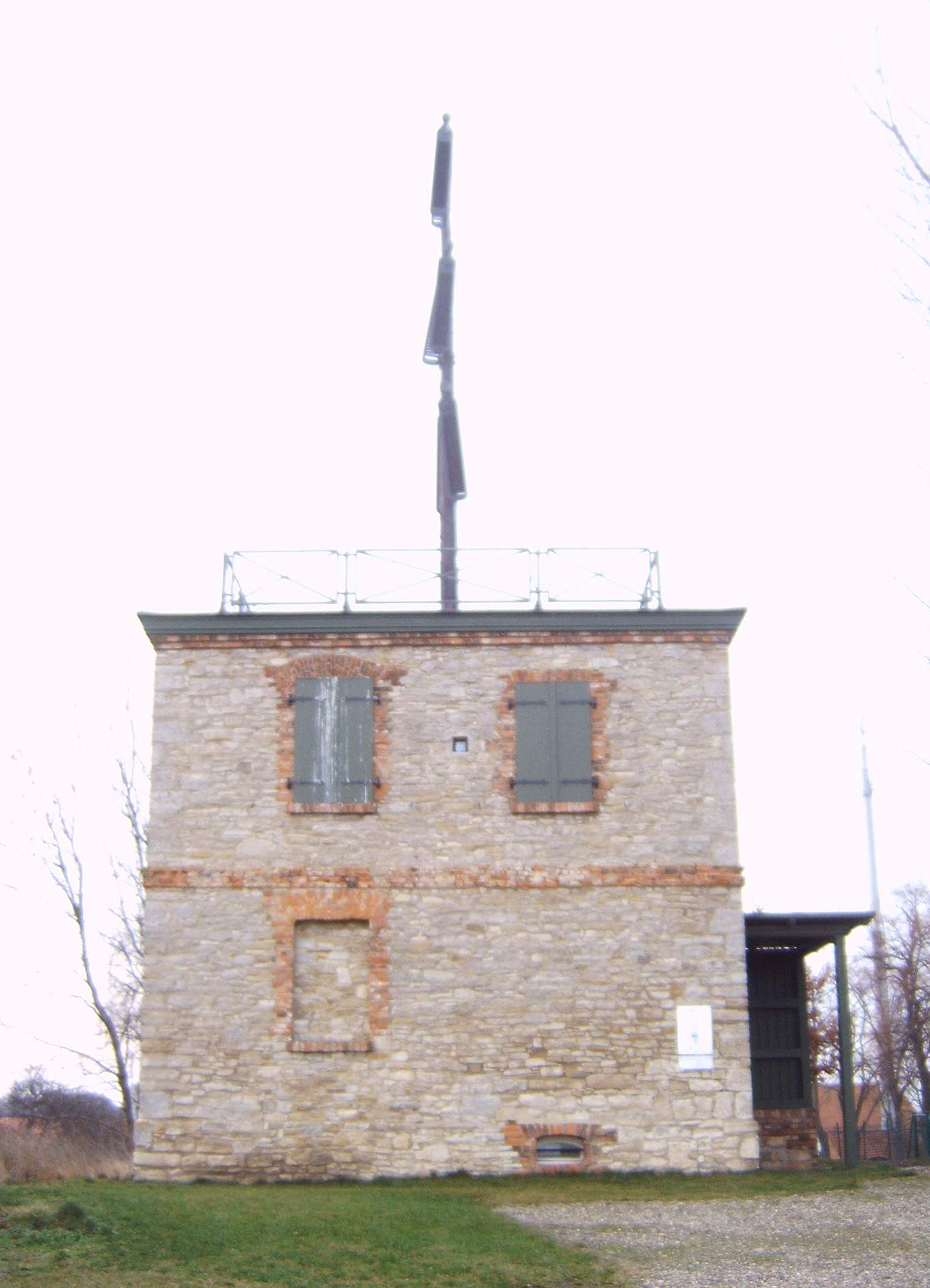
Neuwegersleben telegraph station

== Geography ==
The name Großes Bruch meaning "Great Wetland" denotes the swampy area of a former glacial valley, stretching about 45 km (28 mi) from Oschersleben and the Bode River in the east to Hornburg in the west. For centuries the inaccessible bog formed the border between the Duchy of Brunswick-Lüneburg and the Bishopric of Halberstadt. The municipality consists of the Ortsteile (municipal divisions) Gunsleben, Hamersleben, Neuwegersleben and Wulferstedt.

== History ==
Hamersleben was first mentioned in a 1021 deed and in 1111 became the home of an Augustinian Canons Regular monastery which Reinhard, Bishop of Halberstadt had established at Osterwieck three years earlier. The double monastery also became the seat of an archdeacon in 1178. It joined the Congregation of Windesheim in 1452. During the Protestant Reformation Hamersleben was devastated in the course of the German Peasants' War in 1525, again by the troops of the then Lutheran Archbishopric of Magdeburg and once again by the forces of the Swedish Empire during the Thirty Years' War. Nevertheless the abbey retained Roman Catholic confession until its dissolution in 1804. The Catholic monastery church of Saint Pancras is a Romanesque building which is known for its Baroque pipe organ built in 1688. Today it is a stop on the scenic Romanic Road.

The village of Neuwegersleben features one of the few preserved stations of the Prussian optical telegraph line from Berlin to Koblenz built in 1833. The building has been partly reconstructed and its signals were reinstalled. Today it houses a small museum.

== Transportation ==
Am Großen Bruch is located on the federal highway No. 245 running from Halberstadt to Haldensleben. In Neuwegersleben the highway No. 246 to Wanzleben branches off. The railway line from Oschersleben to Jerxheim in Lower Saxony was closed in 1992.
