= Wilhelm Beyer =

German Nazi official (1885–1945)

Reichstag Deputy
- In office 12 November 1933 – 11 April 1945

Personal details
- Born: 22 March 1885 Hohenmölsen, Kingdom of Prussia, German Empire
- Died: 11 April 1945 (aged 60) Schermcke, Nazi Germany
- Party: Nazi Party
- Occupation: Postal administrator

Military service
- Allegiance: German Empire
- Branch/service: Imperial German Army
- Years of service: 1902

Wilhelm Beyer (22 March 1885 – 11 April 1945) was a German soldier and civil servant who became a politician and official of the Nazi Party. He was also an SA-Oberführer in the Nazi Sturmabteilung (SA). He was killed in the final month of the Second World War in Europe.

== Early life ==
Beyer was born in Hohenmölsen and attended Volksschule there to the age of 14, after which he worked as an apprentice in various industrial companies until he was 17. In 1902, he joined the 96th (7th Thuringian) Infantry Regiment in Naumburg. He then joined the royal police service in Kiel. In 1919, he joined the Reichspost as a postal assistant. After passing the administrative examinations, he was promoted to postal secretary and senior postal secretary. On 1 October 1931, he left the postal service due to illness.

== Nazi Party career ==
Beyer joined the Nazi Party on 15 February 1926 (membership number 30,646). From 1926, he served as treasurer of the Party's Ortsgruppe (local group) in Essen. From 1 August 1928, he held the post of Gau treasurer in Gau Essen. On 29 November 1930, he was elected to the Essen city council.

After the Nazi seizure of power in January 1933, he was elected to a seat in the Reichstag from electoral constituency 23 (Düsseldorf West) at the November 1933 parliamentary election and retained this seat until his death. A member of the Nazi paramilitary, the Sturmabteilung (SA), Beyer was promoted to SA-Standartenführer on 30 January 30, 1937, and to SA-Oberführer in SA-Gruppe Niederrhein on 9 November 1942. He carried the ranks of Hauptamtsleiter and Hauptbereichsleiter in the Party bureaucracy. Beyer died while in route to a business trip to Hamburg during combat operations in Schermcke during the final phase of the Second World War.

== Sources ==
- Information about Wilhelm Beyer in the Reichstag database
- Lilla, Joachim; Doring, Martin; Schulz, Andreas (2004): Statisten in Uniform: Die Mitglieder des Reichstags 1933–1945. Ein biographisches Handbuch. Unter Einbeziehung der völkischen und nationalsozialistischen Reichstagsabgeordneten ab Mai 1924. Droste, p. 38, ISBN 978-3-770-05254-7.
- Stockhorst, Erich (1985). 5000 Köpfe: Wer War Was im 3. Reich. Arndt. ISBN 978-3-887-41116-9.
