= Ekkehard of Huysburg =

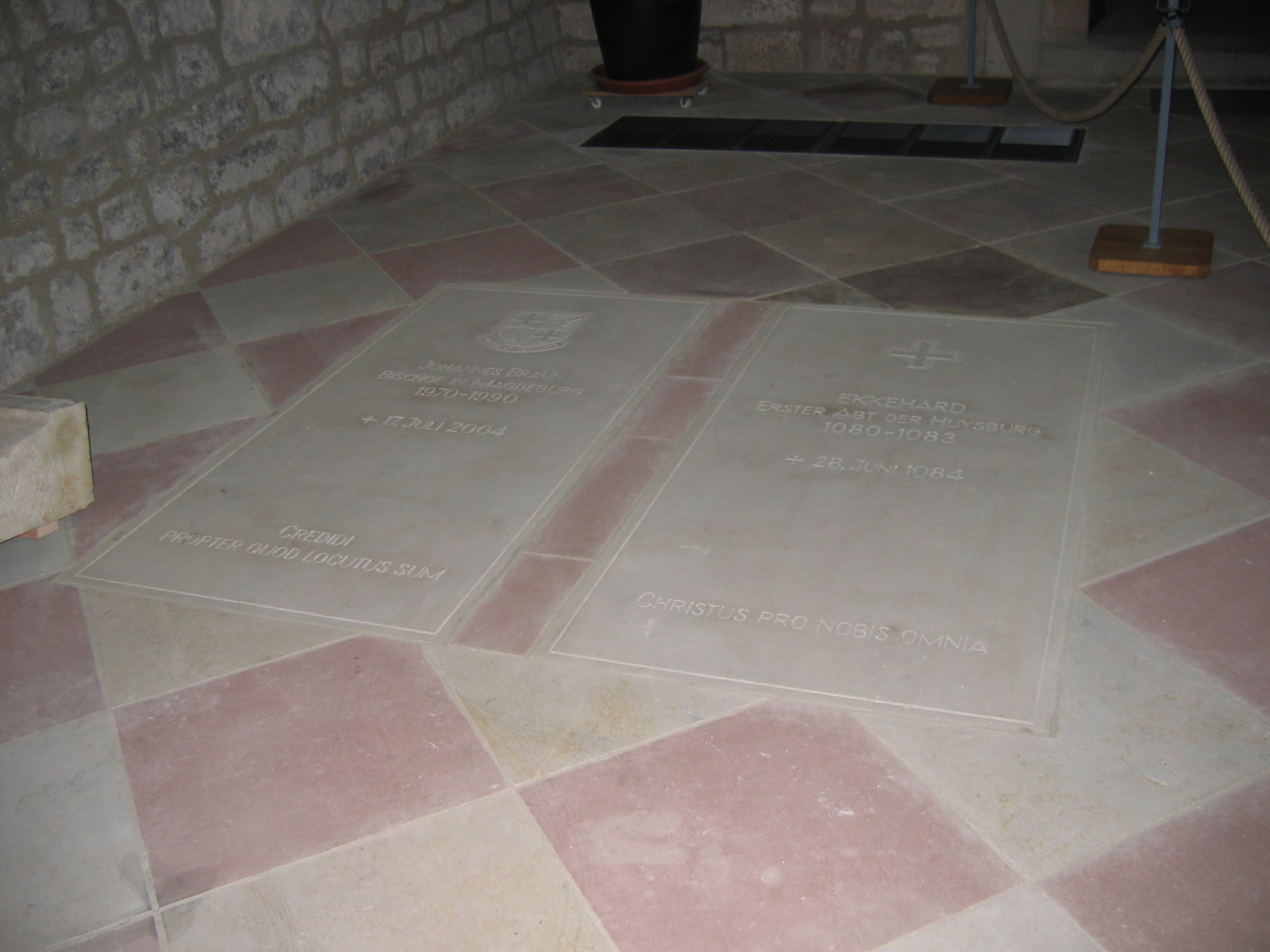
Ekkehard's tomb at Huysburg Abbey

Blessed Ekkehard of Huysburg (died 28 June 1084) was a canon at Halberstadt Cathedral and first abbot of the Benedictine abbey in Huysburg.

== Life ==
According to the chronicles of the Annalista Saxo, Ekkehard about 1070 was appointed by Bishop Burchard II of Halberstadt as the spiritual director of the anchorite Pia, a nun from Quedlinburg, who lived at the site of a former Carolingian fortress in the Huy hill range north of the Halberstadt walls. Ekkehard also induced Adelheid from Gandersheim and Ida from Quedlinburg to live with Pia in her hermitage.

After a short time other men and women gathered there, and Ekkehard founded the double monastery (i.e., for both monks and nuns) of the Huysburg (Huy Castle), of which he was elected the first abbot on 24 December 1080. Bishop Burchard II consecrated him the following year; Ekkehard had a chapel erected and dedicated to St Sixtus, however, he resigned the office on 13 August 1083.

Ekkehard died 28 June 1084 and was first buried in the St Sixtus Chapel. In 1121 his mortal remains were transferred to the newly erected Huysburg abbey church.

== Veneration ==
In 1121 he was beatified. His feast day is 28 June.
