= Huysburg =

Benedictine monastery in Germany

Huysburg Priory
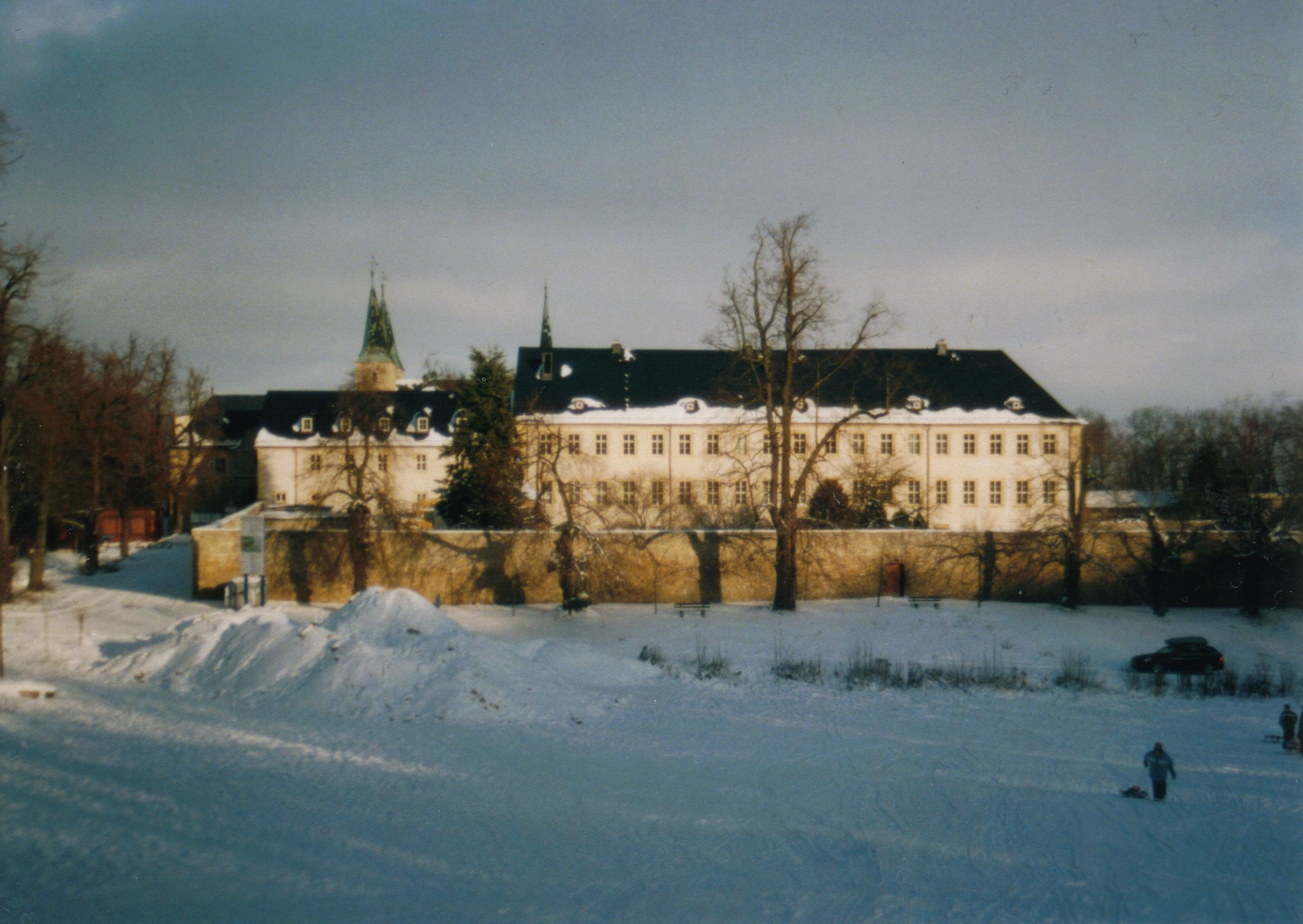

- Location within Saxony-Anhalt Location within Germany

Religion
- Affiliation: Catholic
- Sect: Benedictines

Location
- Location: Huy hill range near Halberstadt
- Country: Germany
- Coordinates: 51°57′37″N 11°00′07″E

Huysburg ([ˈhyːsbʊrk]; German: Kloster Huysburg) is a Benedictine monastery situated on the Huy hill range near Halberstadt, in the German state of Saxony-Anhalt. The Romanesque abbey has existed since about 1080 and was secularised in 1804. A new Benedictine community was founded in 1972 and has been headed by a prior since 1984.

== History ==
Remains of a circular rampart denote a Frankish castle at the site, erected about 790 AD during the Saxon Wars of Charlemagne. When in the mid 10th century Emperor Otto I built his residence in Magdeburg on the Elbe river, the strategical significance of the Huy fortress decreased. In 997 Emperor Otto III ceded it to the Bishops of Halberstadt. According to the chronicles by the Annalista Saxo, they had a first chapel built on the Huy hills, which was consecrated in 1058. In 1070 Bishop Burchard II of Halberstadt gave permission to establish a hermitage of three Benedictine nuns from Quedlinburg and Gandersheim.

=== Huysburg Abbey ===
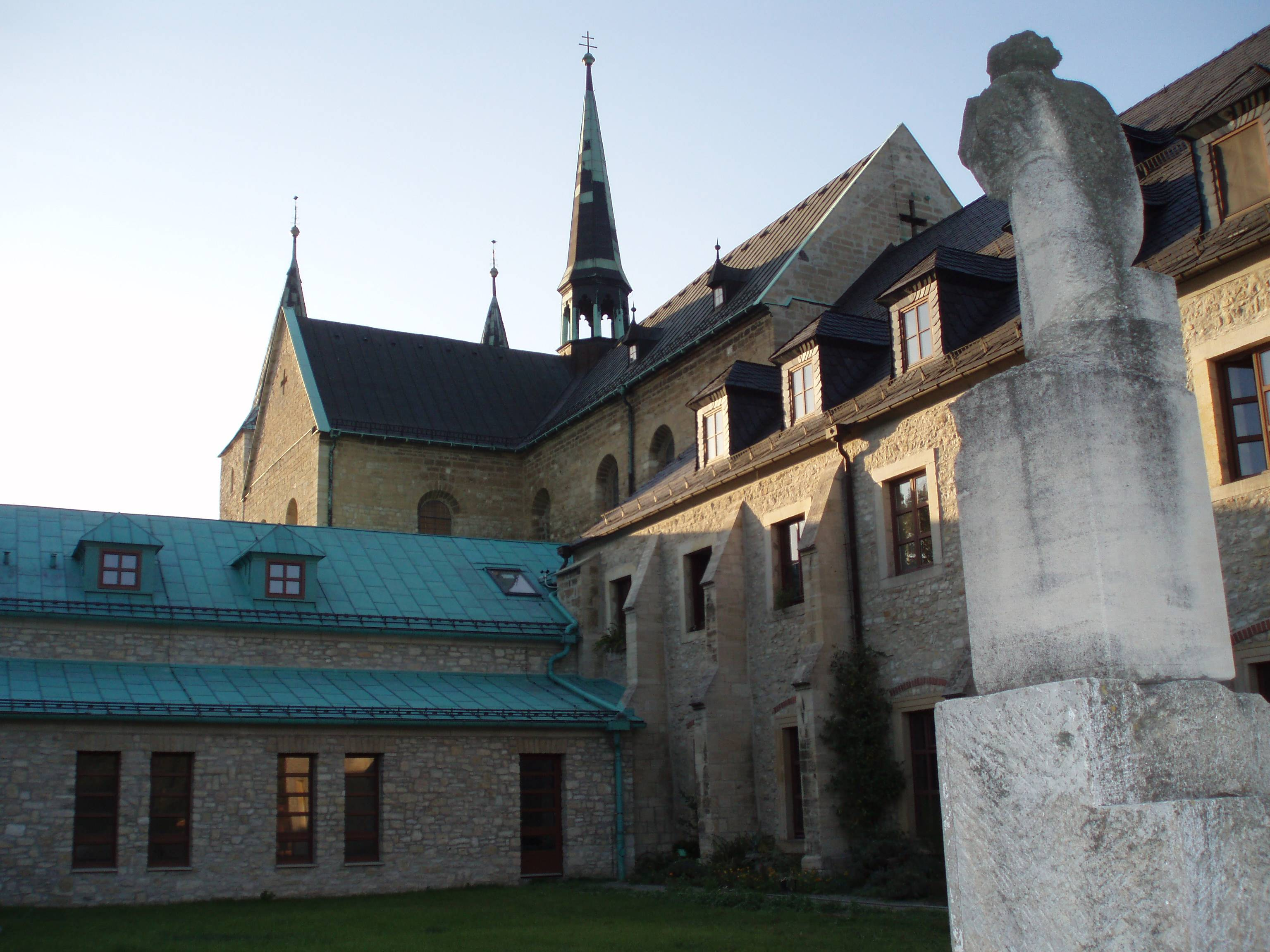
Church and sacristy

The first abbot, Ekkehard of Huysburg, a canon of Halberstadt Cathedral, was appointed on 24 December 1080 and ordained on 21 June 1081; he died three years later. The convent received extended manors by Bishop Burchard and from 1114 onwards was vested with further estates by Burchard's successor Bishop Reinhard. Beside the convent, the hermitage of nuns existed until the early 15th century.

Huysburg Abbey was among the earliest monasteries to join the reform movement of the Bursfelde Congregation in 1444 and by the late 15th century the convent comprises 31 monks. The economic situation suffered from the German Peasants' War and the Schmalkaldic War, as well as from the devastations during the Thirty Years' War. Nevertheless, Huysburg was one of the very few Catholic monasteries of the region which survived the Reformation under the provisions of the 1648 Treaty of Westphalia – Abbot Adam Adami was actively involved in the negotiations.

Within the secularised Principality of Halberstadt under the 'Great Elector' Frederick William of Brandenburg, the abbey again prospered as a centre of the Catholic minority. It was finally dissolved in 1804 as part of the secularisation process and its estates were taken by the Prussian state. Its domains were incorporated into the Province of Saxony. In 1823 King Frederick William III ceded them to his general Karl Friedrich von dem Knesebeck.

=== Huysburg Priory ===
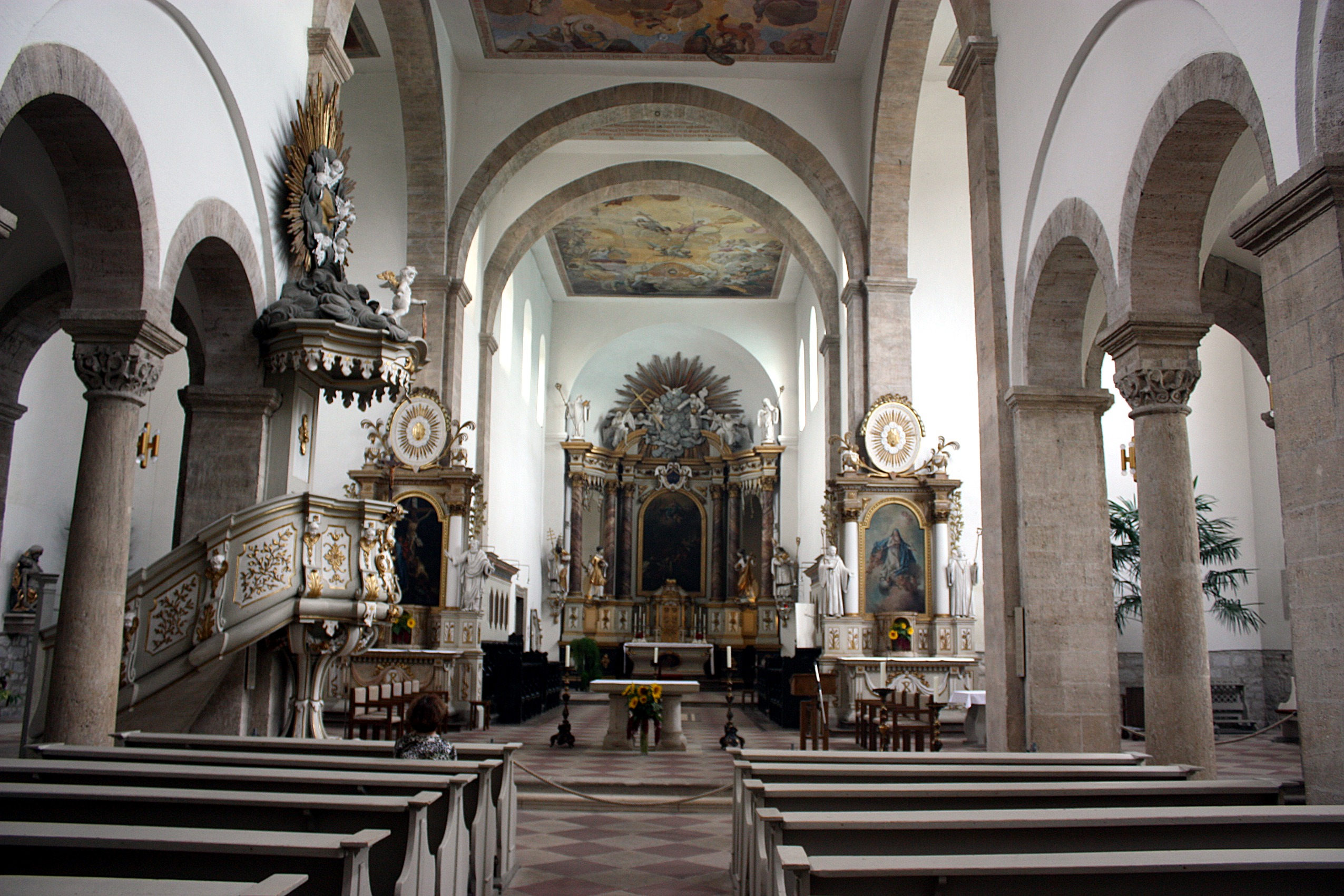
Church interior

After World War II, the Knesebeck noble family was disseized by the Soviet occupation forces. Huysburg again became an ecclesiastical site, when a branch seminary of the Catholic Archdiocese of Paderborn was set up here in 1952 for those parts of the diocese lying in East Germany. The seminary was closed in 1993 after the reunification of Germany.

The Benedictine community which is now located within the walls of the Huysburg was founded in 1972, then the only Benedictine monastery in East Germany. It was established as a filial by the monks of Tyniec Abbey in Kraków in cooperation with the Paderborn diocese and its Magdeburg administrator Johannes Braun. Huysburg was elevated to a priory on 8 September 1984.

Under the auspices of the newly established Diocese of Magdeburg, Huysburg since September 2004 has been joined as the priory of St. Matthias' Abbey in Trier. In August 2005 the brothers of St. Matthias' and of the Huysburg priory elected a joint abbot, Ignatius Maass, resident in Trier.

== Church ==
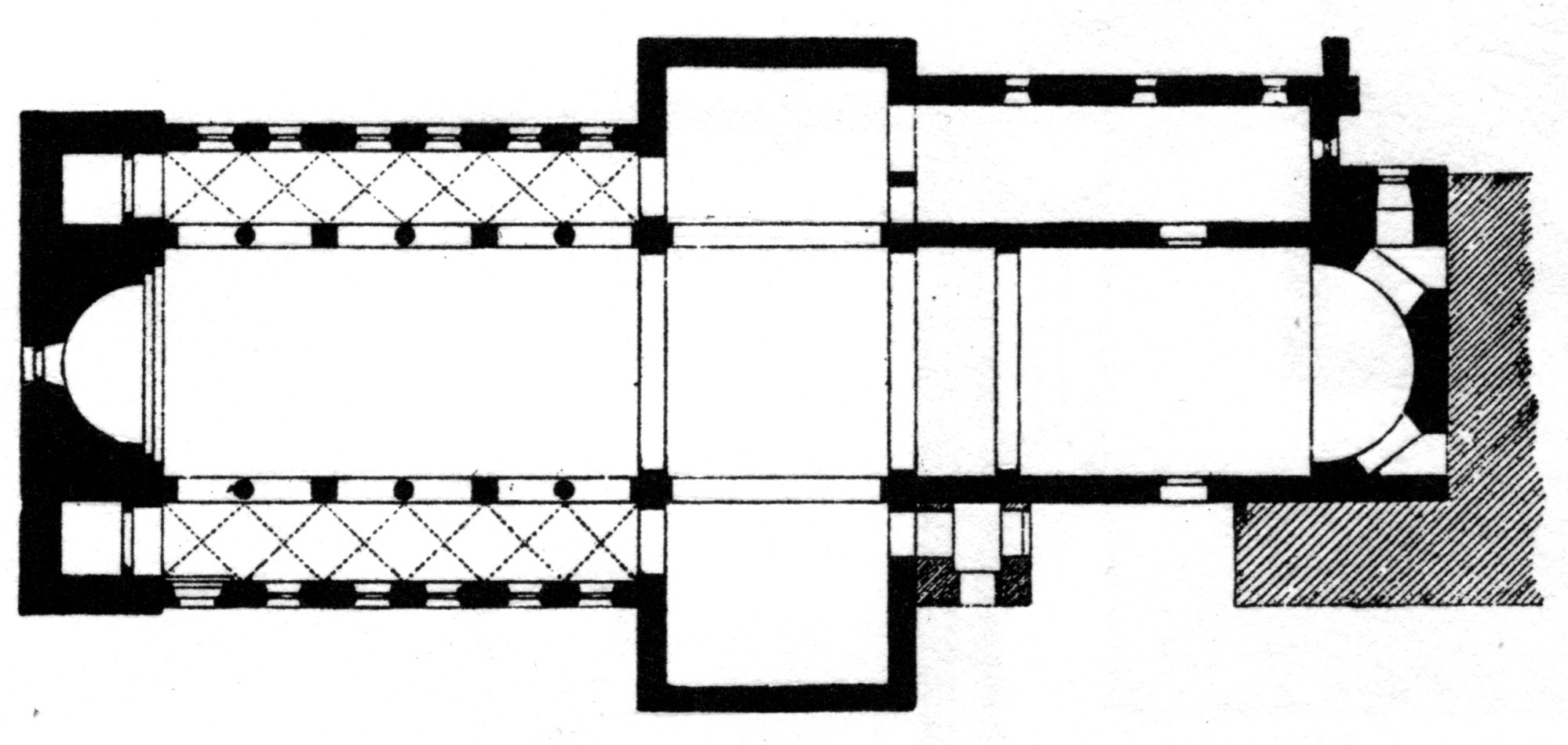
Floor plan of Huysburg

The Romanesque abbey church was consecrated on 7 August 1121. It contains the tomb of the Blessed Ekkehard, the first abbot of Huysburg. In 2004, at his own request, the former apostolic administrator in Magdeburg, Bishop Johannes Braun, was also laid to rest here.

== Pilgrimages ==
The Huysburg is one of the main places of pilgrimage in the Diocese of Magdeburg, and many Catholics come there every year, for example on the first Sunday in September for the Family Pilgrimage of the Diocese.
