= Daneil's Cave =

CAVE LOCATED IN GERMANY

Coordinates: 51°57′45.4″N 10°59′18″E

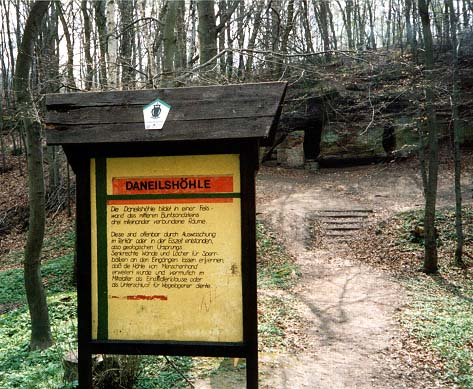
Daneil's Cave in the Huy

Daneil's Cave (German: Daneilshöhle), also called Robber's Cave (Räuberhöhle) is located on the northern side of the Huy ridge in the district of Harz in the German state of Saxony-Anhalt. It is named after the legend of a notorious robber, Daneil.

It forms three caverns that are linked to one another inside a rock face of Middle Bunter Sandstone, each with their own entrance. It is protected as a nature reserve. The caverns apparently formed as a result of erosion during the Neogene Period or during the Ice Age, i.e. they have a geological origin.

Holes for doorframes and vertical walls are evidence that Daneil's Cave has been enlarged by human hand. It may have been a retreat for local people in the Middle Ages. That the Daneil's Cave was also a hideaway for highwaymen and robbers, is clear from legal proceedings against Simon Bingelhelm from Halberstadt, who was known as Tausendteufel ("Thousand Devils"), and who was sentenced in June 1600 to be executed by dismemberment for committing murders and other crimes in Gröningen.

== Literature ==
- Legend of Daneil the robber (in German)
