= Peseckendorf =

- Ortsteil of Oschersleben
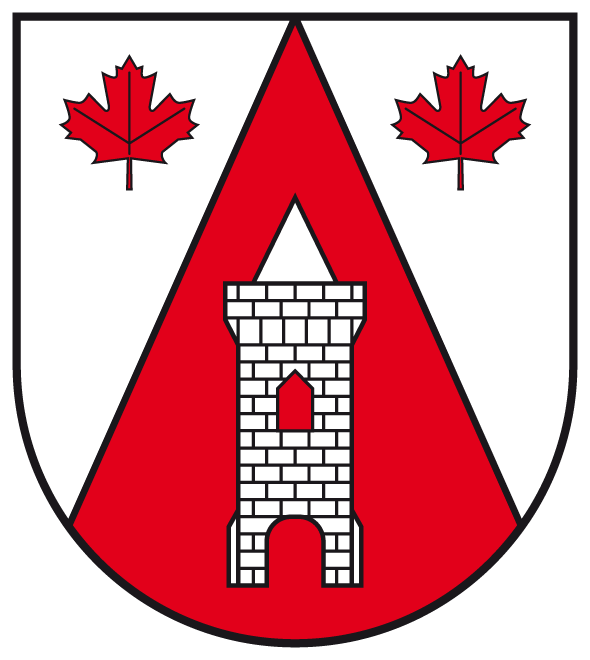
- Coat of arms
- Interactive map of Peseckendorf
- Location within Germany Location within Saxony-Anhalt
- Coordinates: 52°1′23″N 11°19′23″E
- Country: Germany
- State: Saxony-Anhalt
- District: Börde
- Town: Oschersleben

Area
  - Total: 6.87 km^{2} (2.65 sq mi)
- Elevation: 83 m (272 ft)

Population (2006-12-31)
  - Total: 224
  - Density: 32.6/km^{2} (84.4/sq mi)
- Time zone: UTC+01:00 (CET)
  - Summer (DST): UTC+02:00 (CEST)
- Postal codes: 39398
- Dialling codes: 039408
- Vehicle registration: BK

Peseckendorf is a village and a former municipality in the Börde district in Saxony-Anhalt, Germany. Since January 1, 2010, it is part of the municipality Oschersleben.
