= Kroppenstedt =

- Town
- Coat of arms

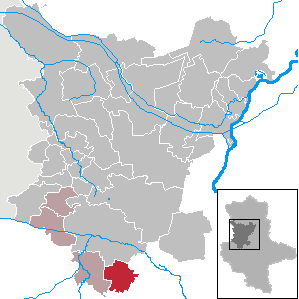
- Location of Kroppenstedt within Börde district
- Interactive map of Kroppenstedt
- Location within Germany Location within Saxony-Anhalt
- Coordinates: 51°56′28.68″N 11°18′30.42″E
- Country: Germany
- State: Saxony-Anhalt
- District: Börde
- Municipal assoc.: Westliche Börde

Government
  - Mayor (2022–29): Joachim Willamowski

Area
  - Total: 38.65 km^{2} (14.92 sq mi)
- Elevation: 99 m (325 ft)

Population (2025-12-31)
  - Total: 1,329
  - Density: 34.39/km^{2} (89.06/sq mi)
- Time zone: UTC+01:00 (CET)
  - Summer (DST): UTC+02:00 (CEST)
- Postal codes: 39397
- Dialling codes: 039264
- Vehicle registration: BK
- Website: www.vgem- westlicheboerde.de

Kroppenstedt (German pronunciation: [ˈkʁɔpn̩ˌʃtɛt]) is a town in the Börde district, in Saxony-Anhalt, Germany, formerly known as Croppenstedt in the Kingdom of Prussia. It is situated southwest of Magdeburg and is part of the Verbandsgemeinde ("collective municipality") Westliche Börde.

One of its most famous sons was the evangelist and philanthropist George Müller, who later moved to Bristol and founded the Ashley Down orphanage.
