= Großes Bruch =

Wetland strip in German

Coordinates: 52°02′51″N 10°58′37″E

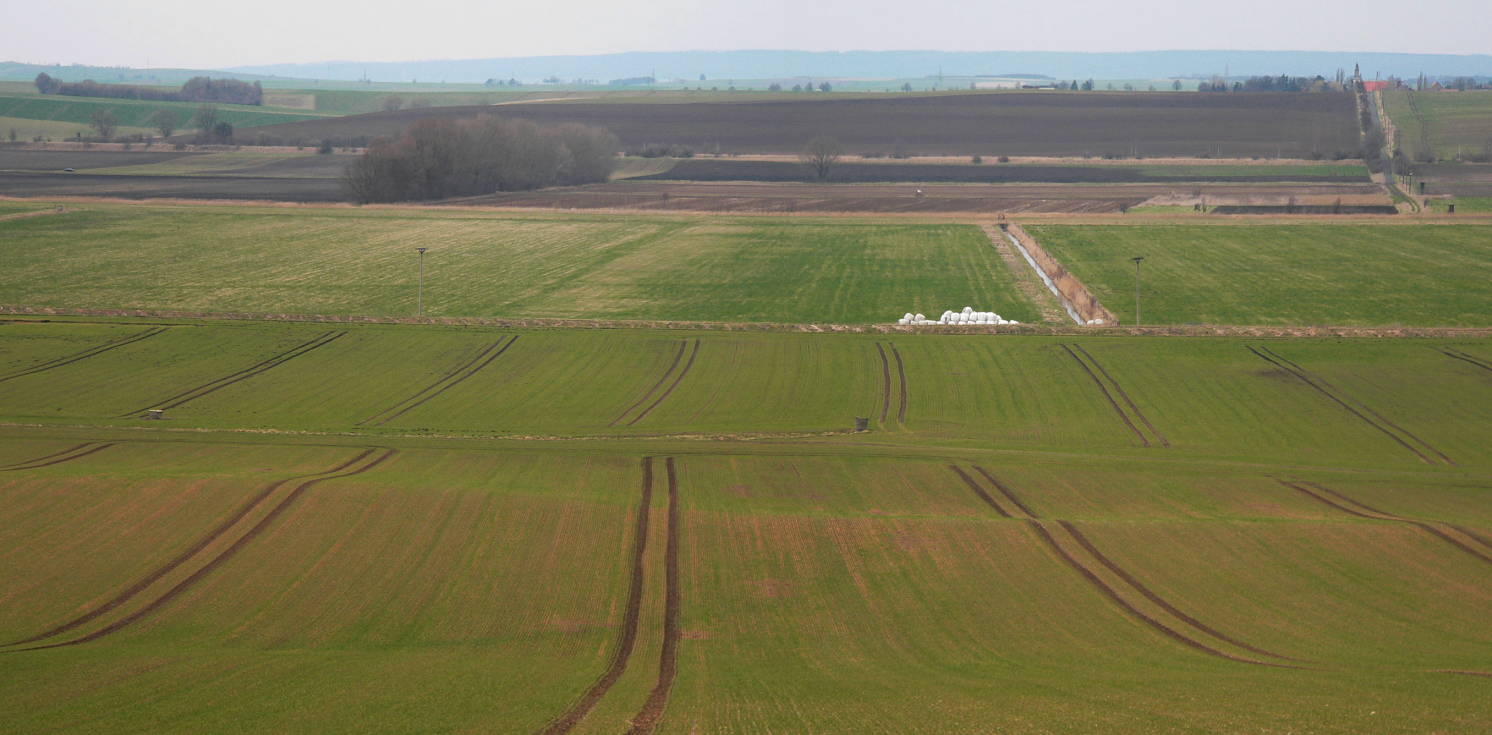
- View from the Großer Fallstein over the Große Bruch looking towards Hedeper View from the Großer Fallstein over the Große Bruch looking towards Hedeper
- Area: 78.3 km²
- Classification: Handbook of Natural Region Divisions of Germany
- Major unit group: 51 → Northern Harz Foreland
- Level 4 Region (major unit): 511 → Großes Bruch
- County/District: Börde, Wolfenbüttel
- State(s): Lower Saxony, Saxony-Anhalt
- Country: Germany

The Großes Bruch ("Great Marsh") is a 45 kilometres (28 mi) long wetland strip in Germany, stretching from Oschersleben in Saxony-Anhalt in the east to Hornburg, Lower Saxony in the west.

The depression formed from a glacial valley. The lowland meadow landscape with numerous reed- and willow-fringed ditches is one to four kilometres wide and runs along the Großer Graben and Schiffgraben ditches connecting the river valleys of the Bode in the east and Oker in the west.

== History ==
Until people began to drain the region in the Middle Ages, it was impassable. According to a writer of the time: "In order to get to Hamersleben Abbey from the south, one has to use a ferry from the place where, today, the Neudamm is located and the village of Wegersleben (later Neuwegersleben)." The oldest building in Neudamm, a residential tower built of rubble stone, is thus called in Low German dat ole Fährhus ("the old ferryman's house"), an adjacent field is de Fährbrai and the road from Schwanebeck dä ole Fährweg ("the old ferry way").

According to legend, during a severe storm in 1130, a ferryman named Eulunardus refused to ferry count palatine Frederick II of Sommerschenburg, who killed him in a fit of violent temper. Out of remorse, Frederick confessed the murder to Abbot Siegfried of Hamersleben Abbey, gave the monastery a hide of farmland, supported the victim's family with money, and ensured that Bishop Rudolf of Halberstadt could build a dyke in 1137. The residential tower became a customs post as the Low German name oppen Tolly recalls. Also, the place name "Neudamm" ("new dyke") implies to the crossing of a wetland. The Hessen Dyke (Hessendamm), too, the metalled, western road across the Großes Bruch between Hessen and Mattierzoll recalls the construction of a medieval road that led through the Bruch and enabled grassland to be cultivated.

== Drainage ==
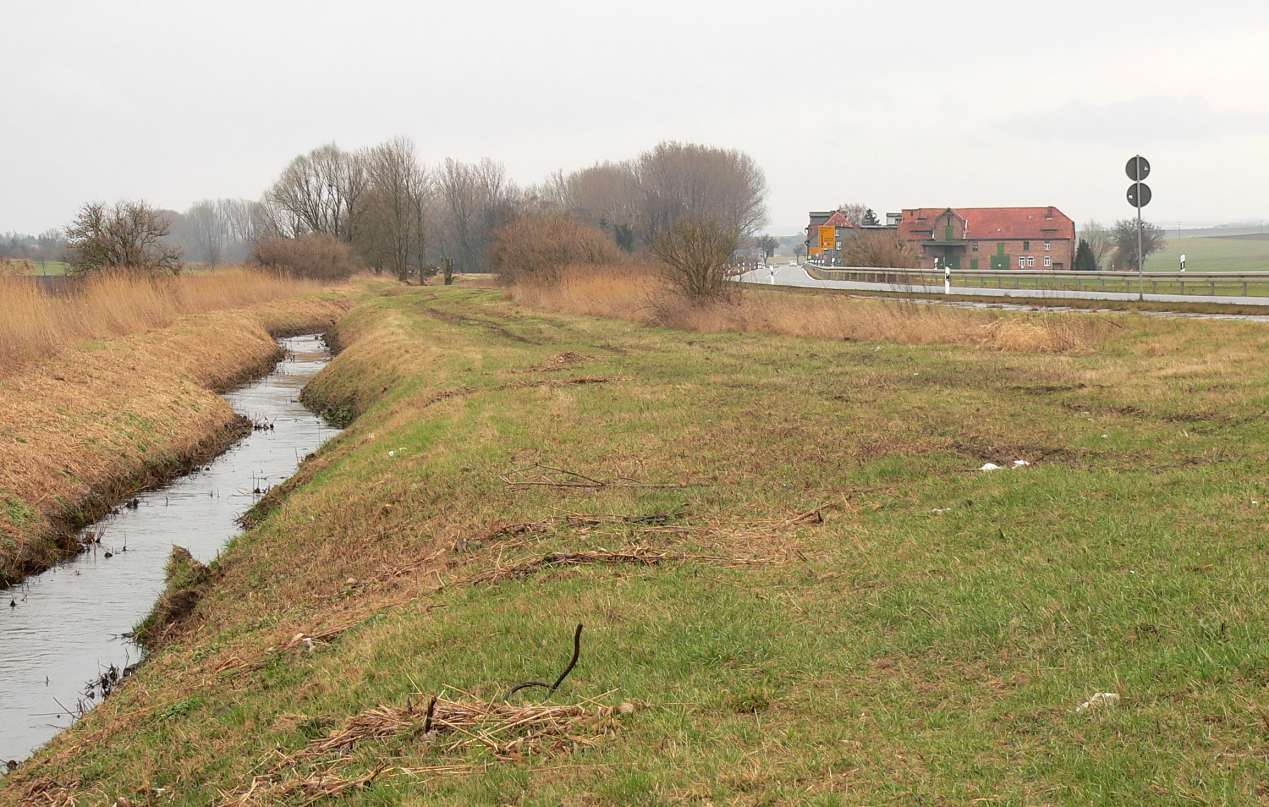
Hessendamm Road

The first drainage measures were carried out at the behest of the Halberstadt Prince-Bishops, who held the territory around Osterwieck south of the Großes Bruch. The Dukes of Brunswick-Lüneburg laid out the Hessendamm so that, from the northern side, they could reach the Hessen Castle outpost they had acquired from the comital House of Regenstein in 1343. Both rulers had the Großer Graben and Schiffgraben ditches laid out along the border of their Imperial State territories. The lands again became marshy in the Thirty Years' War, but were recultivated by the order of the "Great Elector" Frederick William of Brandenburg in his capacity as Prince of Halberstadt since 1648. The Prussian king Frederick the Great continued his work after the Seven Years' War.

By the 20th century, large-scale, intensive farming had caused severe damage. Farmers lowered the groundwater level, ploughed grasslands, and applied chemical. The result was a loss of animal and plant species. Several regions dried out, and others accumulated water. After World War II the historical frontier between the former Halberstadt territory within the Prussian Province of Saxony (except for Hornburg and Roklum) in the south and the Brunswick lands (except for Hessen and Pabstorf) in the south along the Großes Bruch became the Inner German Border between West and East Germany. Increasing ecological understanding led in 1981 to the decision by the district council of Magdeburg, to place parts of the wetland, some 786 hectares, under protection.

After German reunification in 1990, the government declared the entire Großes Bruch (6,000 hectares) a protected landscape to conserve its fauna. The meadows are home and breeding areas for rare birds, including the hen harrier, Montagu's harrier, Eurasian curlew, short-eared owl, common snipe, and corncrake. The little owl breeds in stands of pollarded willows.
