= Westliche Börde =

Municipality in Saxony-Anhalt, Germany

- Verbandsgemeinde
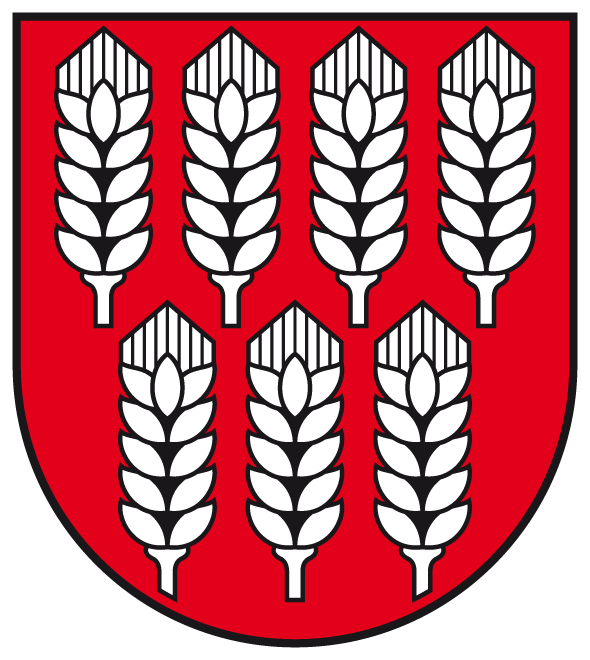
- Coat of arms

- Map of Börde highlighting Westliche Börde
- Interactive map of Westliche Börde
- Location within Germany Location within Saxony-Anhalt
- Coordinates: 51°56′N 11°13′E
- Country: Germany
- State: Saxony-Anhalt
- District: Börde
- Seat: Gröningen

Government
  - Mayor (2024–31): Fabian Stankewitz

Area
  - Total: 181.73 km^{2} (70.17 sq mi)

Population (2025-12-31)
  - Total: 8,183
  - Density: 45.03/km^{2} (116.6/sq mi)
- Time zone: UTC+01:00 (CET)
  - Summer (DST): UTC+02:00 (CEST)
- Vehicle registration: BK
- Website: www.vgem-westlicheboerde.de

Westliche Börde is a Verbandsgemeinde ("collective municipality") in the Börde district in Saxony-Anhalt, Germany. Before 1 January 2010, it was a Verwaltungsgemeinschaft. It is situated approximately 35 km southwest of Magdeburg, in the western part of the Magdeburger Börde. The seat of the Verbandsgemeinde is in Gröningen.

The Verbandsgemeinde Westliche Börde consists of the following municipalities:

- Am Großen Bruch
- Ausleben
- Gröningen
- Kroppenstedt
