= Altbrandsleben =

- Stadtteil of Oschersleben
- Interactive map of Altbrandsleben
- Location within Germany Location within Saxony-Anhalt
- Coordinates: 52°4′23″N 11°15′0″E
- Country: Germany
- State: Saxony-Anhalt
- District: Börde
- Town: Oschersleben

Area
  - Total: 7.71 km^{2} (2.98 sq mi)
- Elevation: 171 m (561 ft)

Population (2006-12-31)
  - Total: 347
  - Density: 45.0/km^{2} (117/sq mi)
- Time zone: UTC+01:00 (CET)
  - Summer (DST): UTC+02:00 (CEST)
- Postal codes: 39387
- Dialling codes: 039407
- Vehicle registration: BK

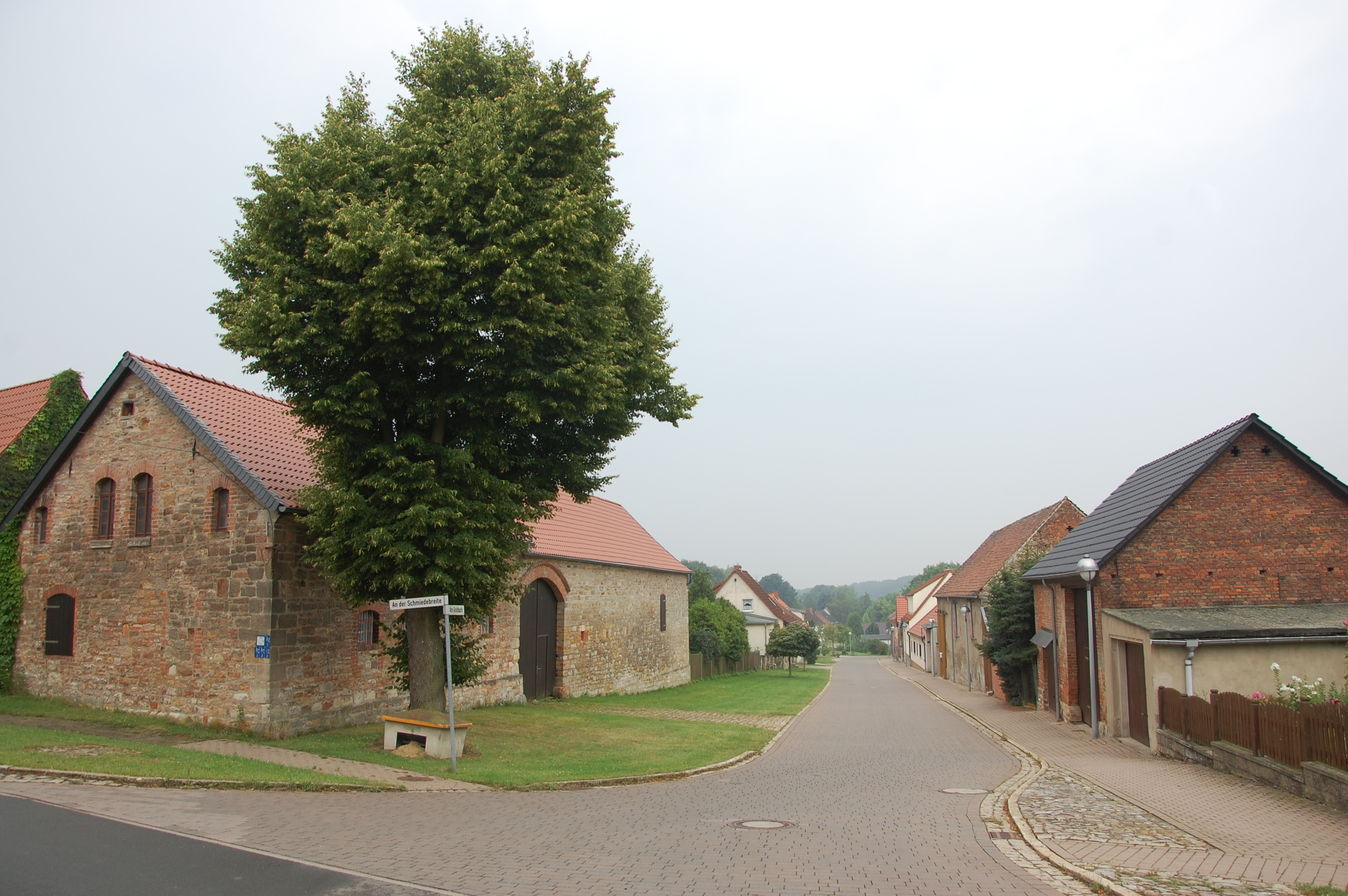

Altbrandsleben is a village and a former municipality in the Börde district in Saxony-Anhalt, Germany. Since 1 July 2009, it is part of the town Oschersleben.
