= Wulferstedt =

- Ortsteil of Am Großen Bruch
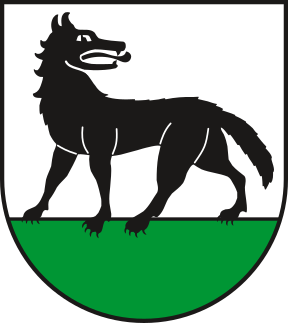
- Coat of arms
- Interactive map of Wulferstedt
- Location within Germany Location within Saxony-Anhalt
- Coordinates: 52°1′N 11°8′E
- Country: Germany
- State: Saxony-Anhalt
- District: Börde
- Municipality: Am Großen Bruch

Area
  - Total: 16.18 km^{2} (6.25 sq mi)
- Elevation: 93 m (305 ft)

Population (2006-12-31)
  - Total: 844
  - Density: 52.2/km^{2} (135/sq mi)
- Time zone: UTC+01:00 (CET)
  - Summer (DST): UTC+02:00 (CEST)
- Postal codes: 39387
- Dialling codes: 039401

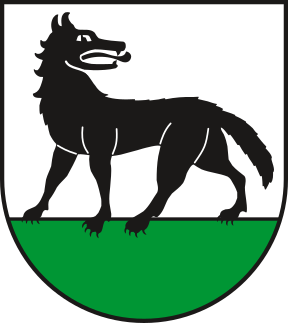

Wulferstedt is a village and a former municipality in the Börde district in Saxony-Anhalt, Germany.

Since 1 January 2010, it is part of the municipality Am Großen Bruch.
