= Ausleben =

- Municipality
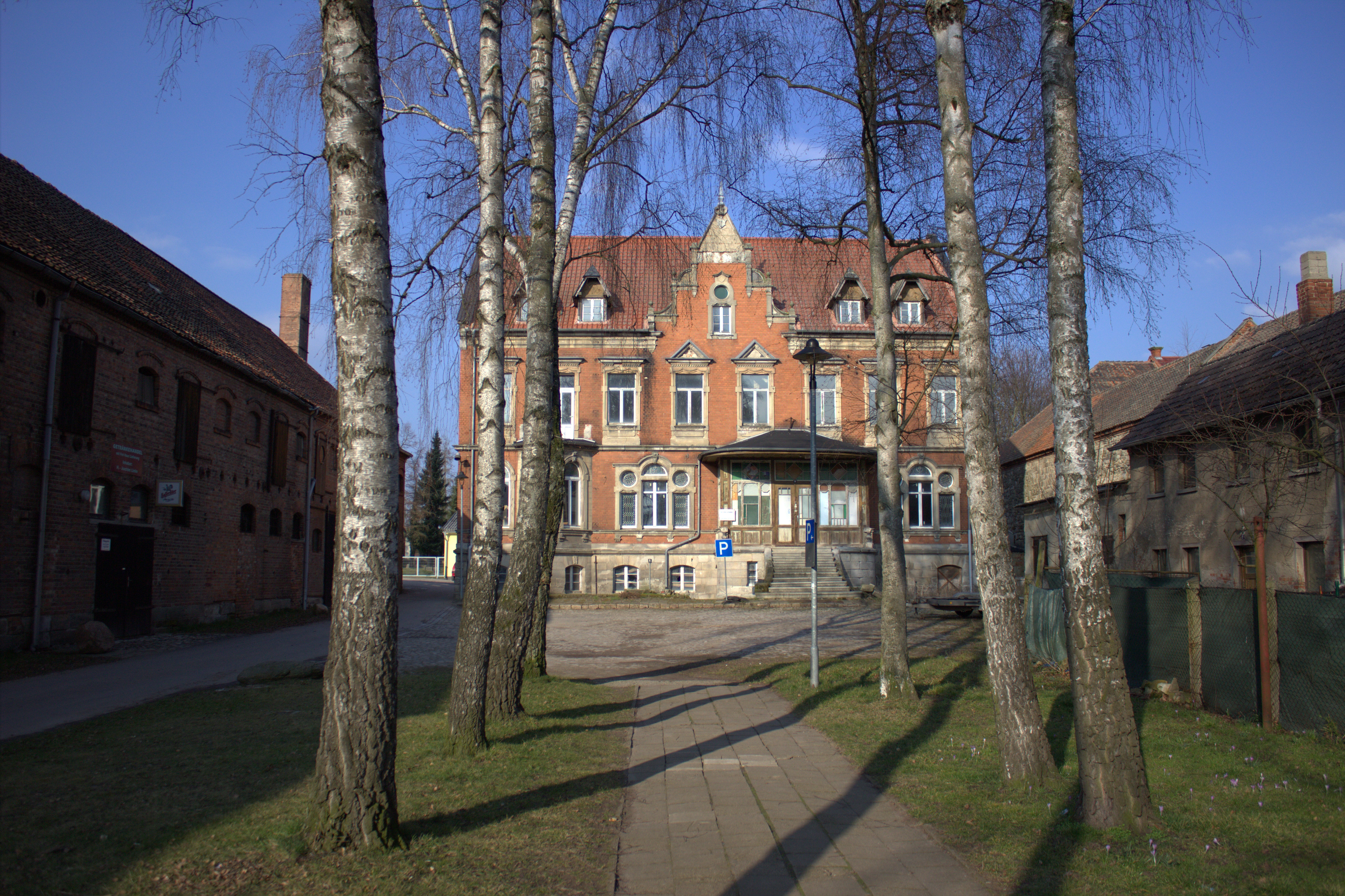

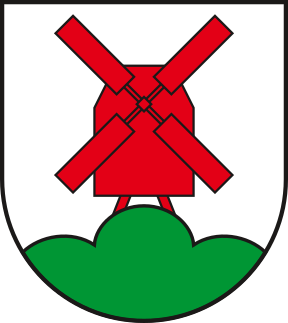
- Coat of arms

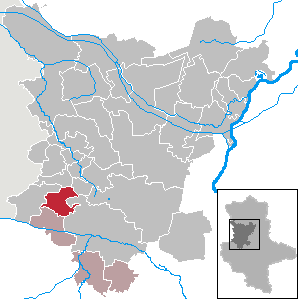
- Location of Ausleben within Börde district
- Interactive map of Ausleben
- Location within Germany Location within Saxony-Anhalt
- Coordinates: 52°5′24″N 11°7′0″E
- Country: Germany
- State: Saxony-Anhalt
- District: Börde
- Municipal assoc.: Westliche Börde

Government
  - Mayor (2017–24): Dietmar Schmidt

Area
  - Total: 33.29 km^{2} (12.85 sq mi)
- Elevation: 105 m (344 ft)

Population (2025-12-31)
  - Total: 1,553
  - Density: 46.65/km^{2} (120.8/sq mi)
- Time zone: UTC+01:00 (CET)
  - Summer (DST): UTC+02:00 (CEST)
- Postal codes: 39393
- Dialling codes: 039404
- Vehicle registration: BK
- Website: www.vgem- westlicheboerde.de

Ausleben is a municipality in the Börde district in Saxony-Anhalt, Germany.
