= Hadmersleben =

- Stadtteil of Oschersleben
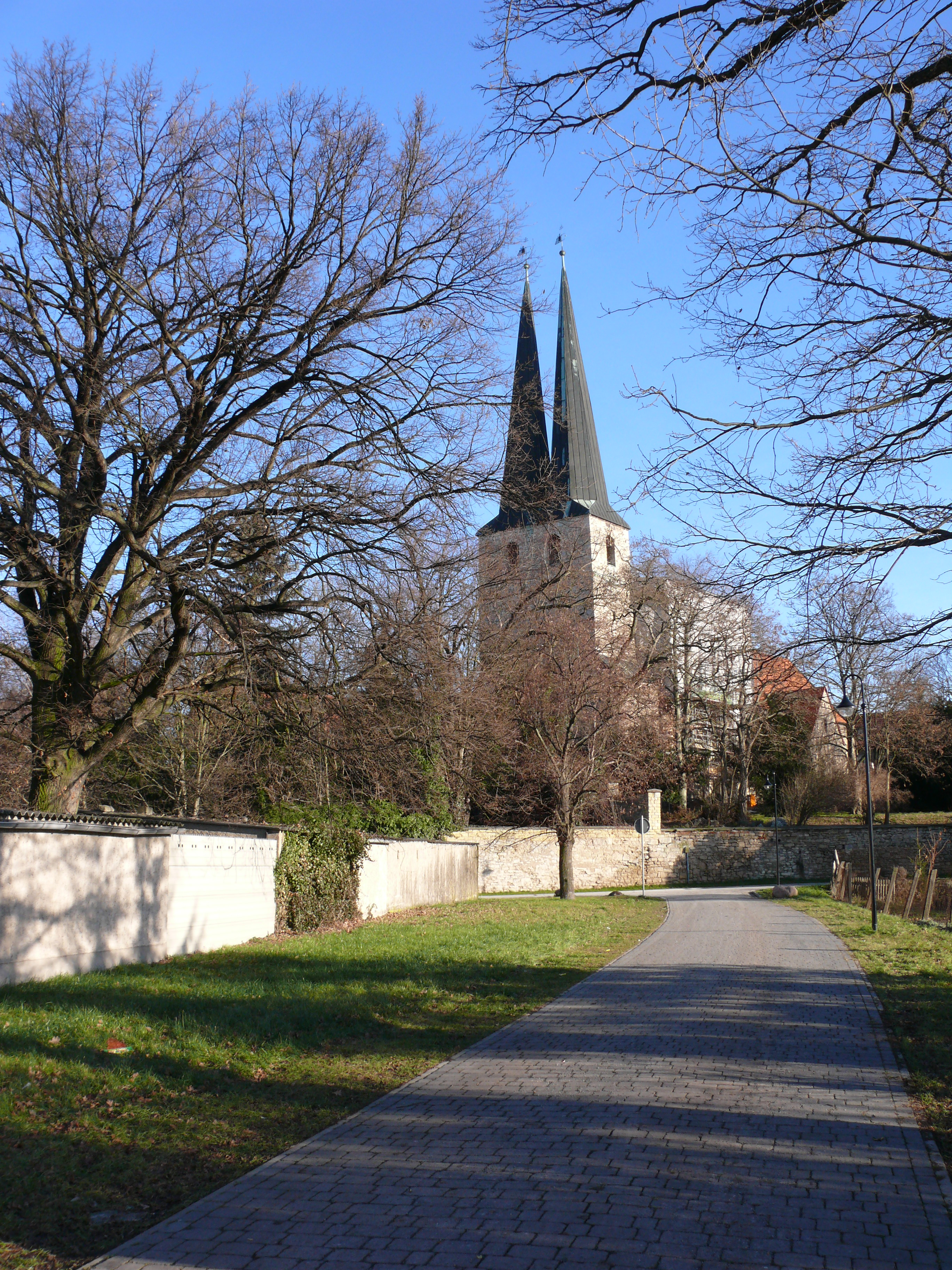

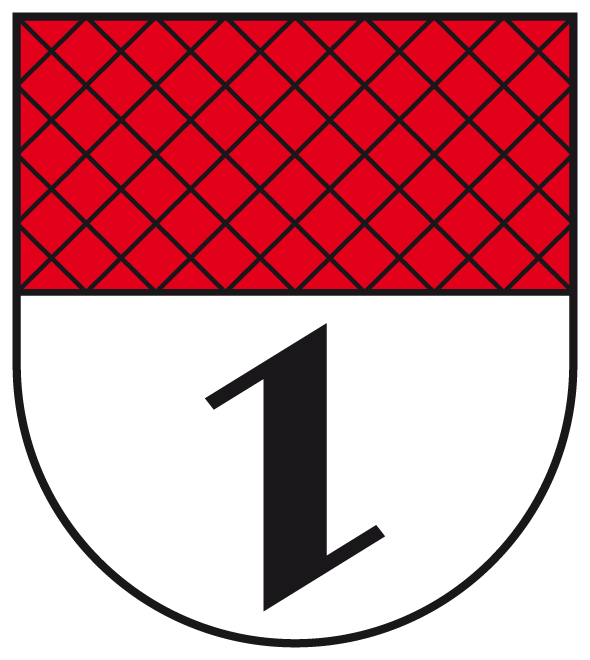
- Coat of arms
- Interactive map of Hadmersleben
- Location within Germany Location within Saxony-Anhalt
- Coordinates: 51°59′12″N 11°18′0″E
- Country: Germany
- State: Saxony-Anhalt
- District: Börde
- Town: Oschersleben

Area
  - Total: 23.39 km^{2} (9.03 sq mi)
- Elevation: 83 m (272 ft)

Population (2009-12-31)
  - Total: 1,749
  - Density: 74.78/km^{2} (193.7/sq mi)
- Time zone: UTC+01:00 (CET)
  - Summer (DST): UTC+02:00 (CEST)
- Postal codes: 39398
- Dialling codes: 039408
- Vehicle registration: BÖ

Hadmersleben is a village and a former municipality in the Börde district, in Saxony-Anhalt, Germany. Since 1 September 2010, it is part of the town of Oschersleben.

== History ==
Hadmersleben was first documented in 961 as the site of a Benedictine convent. The abbey of St. Peter and Paul became part of the Prince-Bishopric of Halberstadt and played a key role in ecclesiastical landholding throughout the Middle Ages.

In the 16th century, the convent was secularized during the Protestant Reformation and its estates came under the control of the Duchy of Magdeburg.

During World War II, the nearby salt mines were adapted for military manufacturing, and in early 1945 Allied intelligence reported an underground assembly plant near Hadmersleben tied to Junkers Aircraft production.

After German reunification, Hadmersleben remained an independent municipality until its merger into Oschersleben in 2010.

== Heritage and Culture ==
The former abbey church of St. Peter and Paul is a stop on the Road of Romanesque architecture route, noted for its 12th‑century lion‑head door pull and a Romanesque crypt. Today the complex houses the Kulturhistorisches Museum Klosterkirche Hadmersleben, showcasing medieval liturgical objects and Baroque furnishings.

Annual events include the “Romanik Festival,” which features guided tours, early music concerts, and historic reenactments in the monastery precincts.

== Demographics ==
As of 2009, Hadmersleben had 1,749 inhabitants, with a population density of ~75 PD/km². Like much of rural Saxony-Anhalt, it faces long‑term population decline and ageing: between 1990 and 2020 the Börde district’s over‑65 population share rose from 17% to 28%.

== Economy ==
Hadmersleben’s economy is anchored in agriculture (grain, sugar beet) and small‑scale manufacturing in the former monastic buildings. Since reunification, local entrepreneurship has been supported through EU rural development grants promoting agro‑tourism and heritage conservation.

== Contemporary Issues ==
=== Administrative Reform ===
The 2010 merger into Oschersleben was part of a statewide municipal consolidation intended to improve service delivery and fiscal stability, though some residents have voiced concerns over loss of local identity.

=== Demographic Challenges ===
Hadmersleben is contending with outmigration of youth to urban centers and a shrinking tax base; local initiatives include subsidized housing for young families and partnerships with nearby technical schools.

=== Heritage Preservation ===
Balancing tourism with conservation, the Kulturhistorisches Museum has launched a digitization project to catalogue monastic manuscripts, funded by the German Research Foundation (DFG).
