= Großer Fallstein =

German region

Coordinates: 52.00771°N 10.72472°E

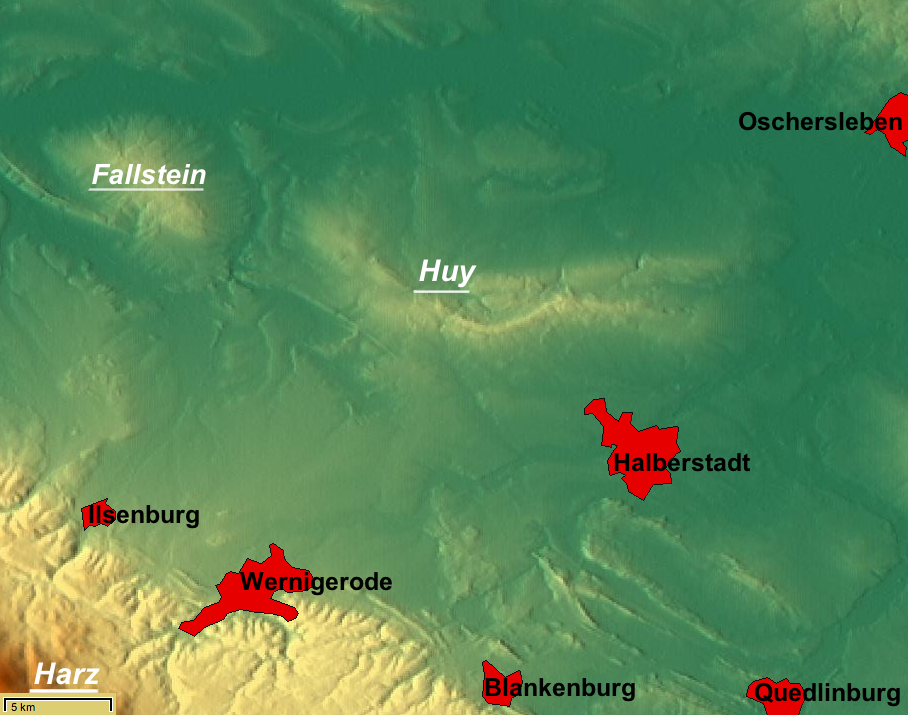
Overview map: The Fallstein top left; the Huy in the centre

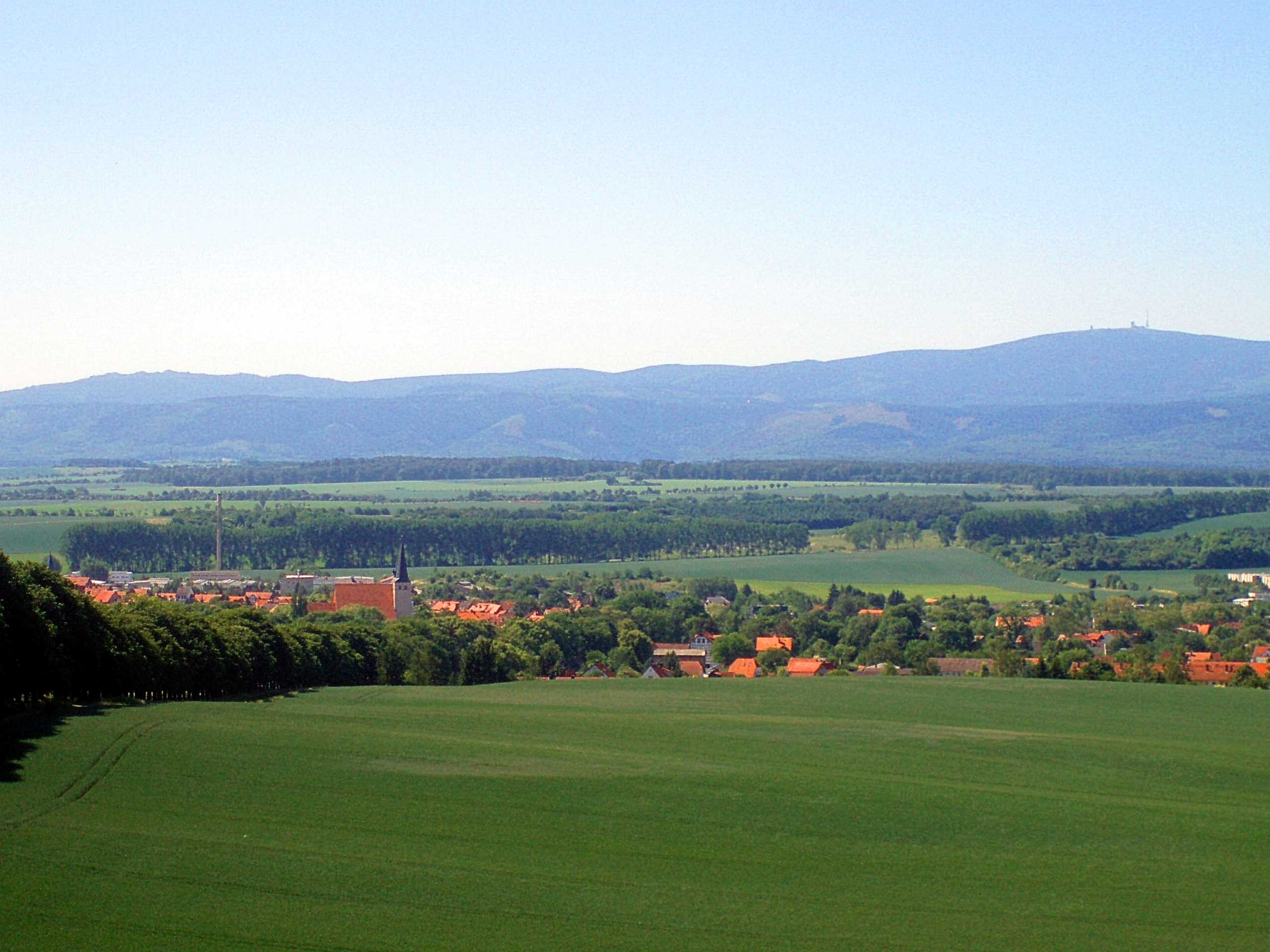
View from the Fallstein across Osterwieck to the Brocken

The Großer Fallstein is a wooded hill region in the German state of Saxony-Anhalt. It lies in the district of Harz on the territory of the town of Osterwieck, north of the Harz Mountains. Its highest point has an elevation of 288 metres above sea level (NN).

The wood that lies not far from the former Inner German Border that ran along the Großes Bruch has an east–west extent of about 4 kilometres and also measures about 4 kilometres from north to south. The region known as "Woods of the Fallstein" (Waldgebiet des Fallstein) is a protected area; around 71 hectares of it are a nature reserve.

The Großer Fallstein is a mixed forest of beech, birch, oak and spruce. In 2004, lynx were spotted in the woods.

The settlements in the ara include Osterwieck, Hessen, Rhoden, Deersheim and Veltheim.
