= Gröningen =

- Town
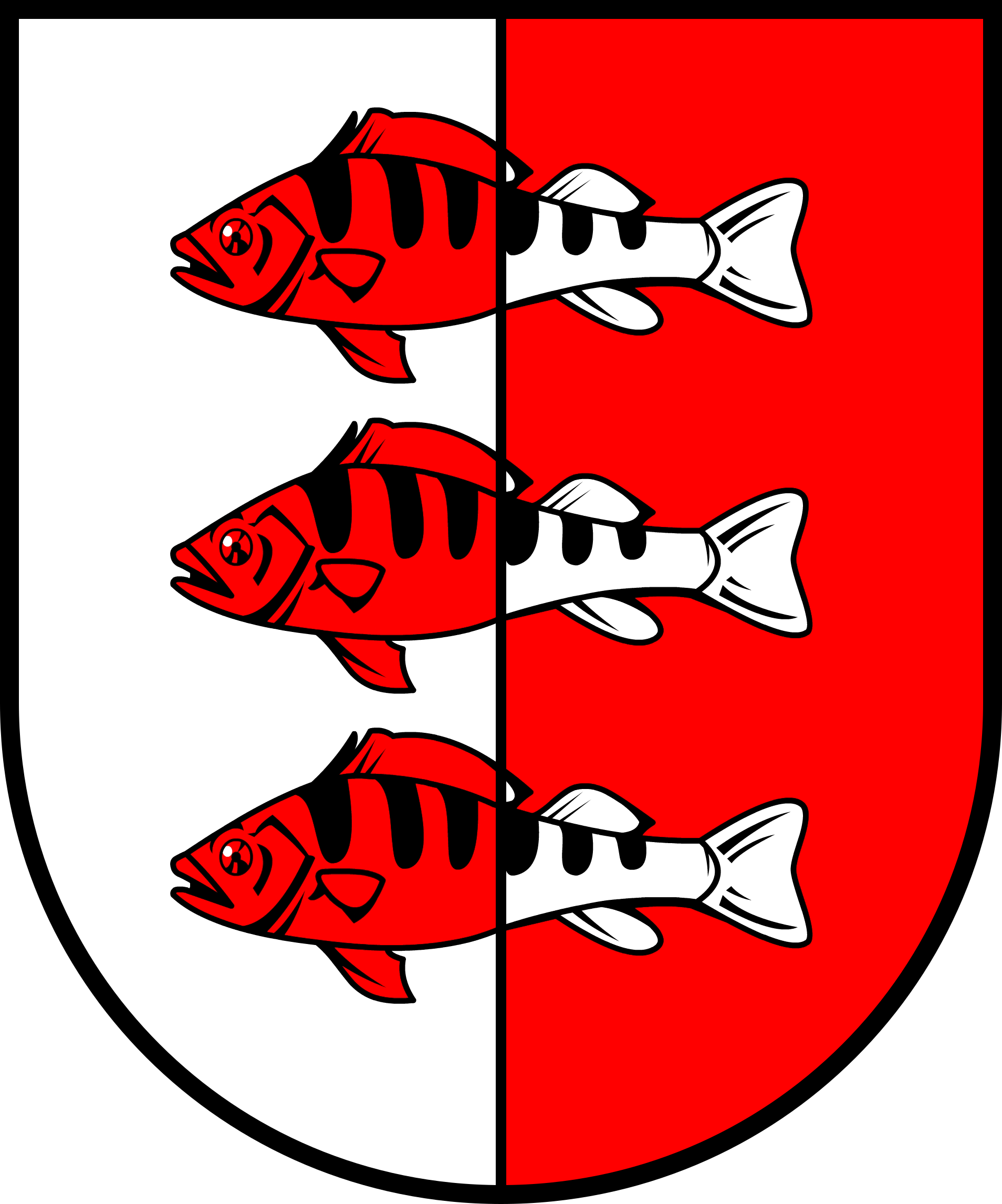
- Coat of arms

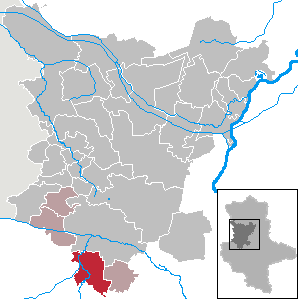
- Location of Gröningen within Börde district
- Interactive map of Gröningen
- Location within Germany Location within Saxony-Anhalt
- Coordinates: 51°56′N 11°13′E
- Country: Germany
- State: Saxony-Anhalt
- District: Börde
- Municipal assoc.: Westliche Börde
- Subdivisions: 5

Government
  - Mayor (2021–28): Ernst Brunner

Area
  - Total: 59.68 km^{2} (23.04 sq mi)
- Elevation: 99 m (325 ft)

Population (2025-12-31)
  - Total: 3,313
  - Density: 55.51/km^{2} (143.8/sq mi)
- Time zone: UTC+01:00 (CET)
  - Summer (DST): UTC+02:00 (CEST)
- Postal codes: 39397
- Dialling codes: 039403
- Vehicle registration: BK
- Website: www.westlicheboerde.de

Gröningen (German pronunciation: [ˈɡʁøːnɪŋən]) is a town in the Börde district in Saxony-Anhalt, Germany. It lies approx. 40 km south-west of Magdeburg, and 10 km east of Halberstadt. It has 3.621 inhabitants (December 2015). Gröningen is part of the Verbandsgemeinde Westliche Börde.

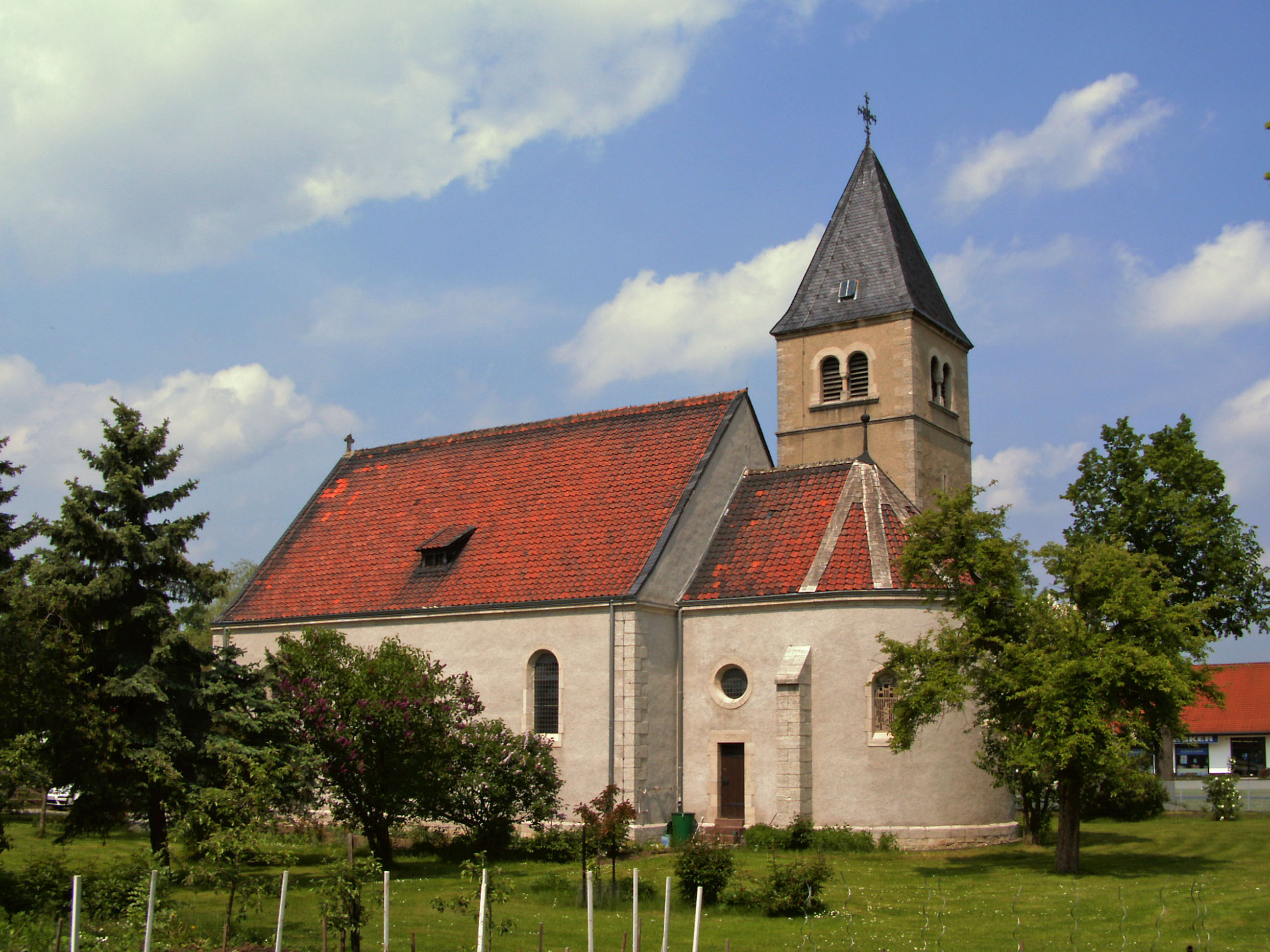
The Catholic Church

== People ==
- Angelika Unterlauf, German journalist (b. 1946)
- Louise Aston, German writer and feminist (b. 1814)
