= Schermcke =

- Stadtteil of Oschersleben
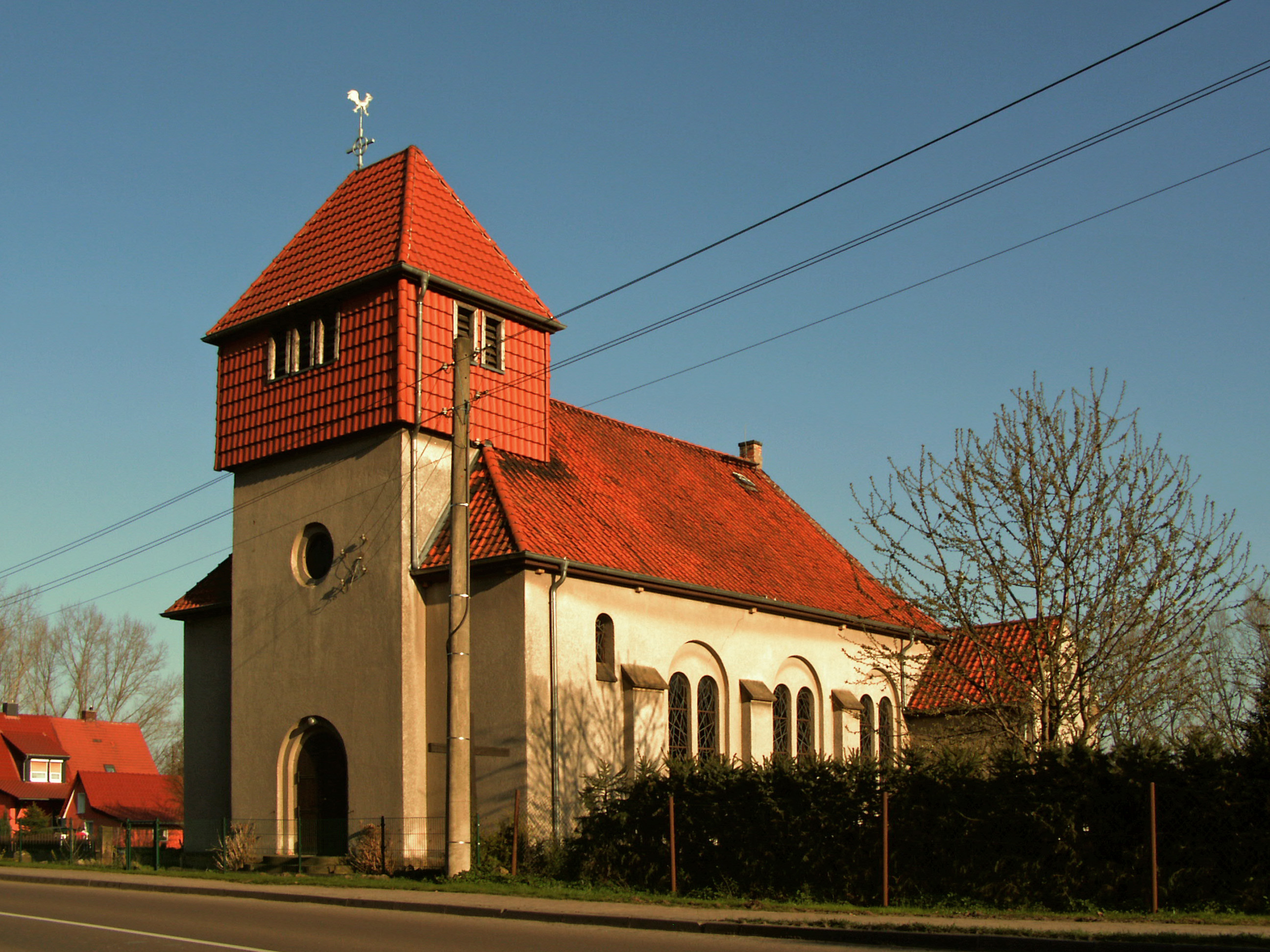
- Church of Saint Norbert

- Coat of arms
- Interactive map of Schermcke
- Location within Germany Location within Saxony-Anhalt
- Coordinates: 52°3′47″N 11°16′59″E
- Country: Germany
- State: Saxony-Anhalt
- District: Börde
- Town: Oschersleben

Area
  - Total: 9.41 km^{2} (3.63 sq mi)
- Elevation: 124 m (407 ft)

Population (2006-12-31)
  - Total: 633
  - Density: 67.3/km^{2} (174/sq mi)
- Time zone: UTC+01:00 (CET)
  - Summer (DST): UTC+02:00 (CEST)
- Postal codes: 39387
- Dialling codes: 039407
- Vehicle registration: BK
- Website: www.schermcke.de

Schermcke is a village and a former municipality in the Börde district in Saxony-Anhalt, Germany. Since 1 July 2009, it is part of the town Oschersleben.
