= Oschersleben =

- Town
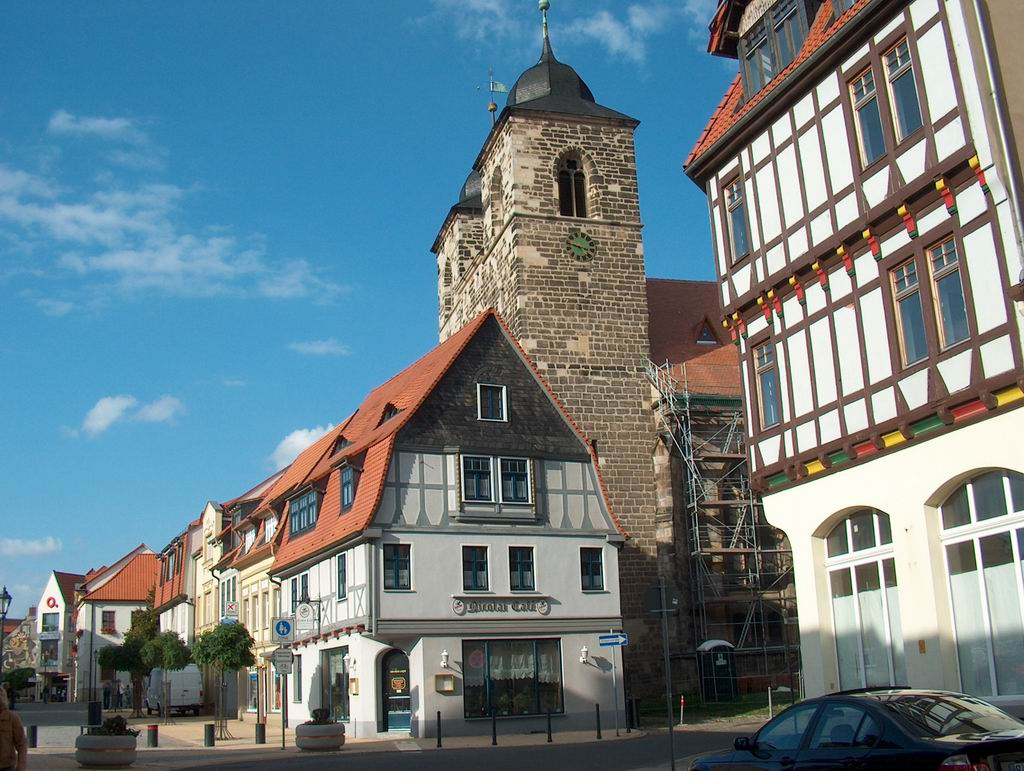

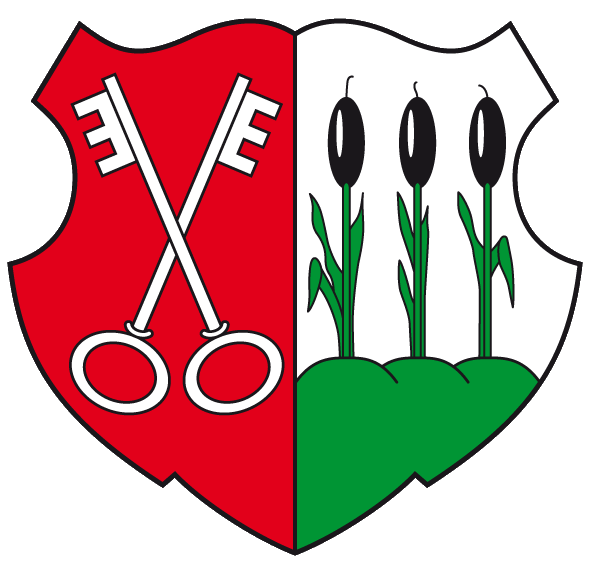
- Coat of arms

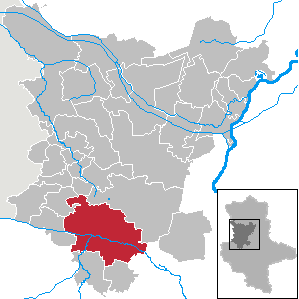
- Location of Oschersleben within Börde district
- Interactive map of Oschersleben
- Location within Germany Location within Saxony-Anhalt
- Coordinates: 52°1′N 11°15′E
- Country: Germany
- State: Saxony-Anhalt
- District: Börde

Government
  - Mayor (2022–29): Benjamin Kanngießer

Area
  - Total: 188.93 km^{2} (72.95 sq mi)
- Elevation: 85 m (279 ft)

Population (2025-12-31)
  - Total: 18,855
  - Density: 99.799/km^{2} (258.48/sq mi)
- Time zone: UTC+01:00 (CET)
  - Summer (DST): UTC+02:00 (CEST)
- Postal codes: 39387, 39398
- Dialling codes: 03949, 039408
- Vehicle registration: BK, BÖ, OC
- Website: www.oscherslebenbode.de

Oschersleben (German: [ˈɔʃɐsˌleːbm̩]) is a town in the Börde district, in Saxony-Anhalt, Germany, about 40 kilometres (25 mi) southwest of Magdeburg. The population in 2020 was about 19,000.

== History ==
On November 23, 994 Oschersleben was first mentioned in a document by the Emperor Otto III. In 1235 it was first referred to as a town. In the 17th century most parts of Oschersleben were destroyed by fires. In 1648 it came under Brandenburg's domination. Oschersleben became a district capital in 1816 and was connected to the railway system in 1843.

In the years prior to World War II Oschersleben expanded due to the AGO Flugzeugwerke aircraft factory that was founded there in 1916 and once again needed numerous workers. This military aircraft factory operated under the differing name of "Apparatebau GmbH Oschersleben" during the years of the Third Reich, to retain the AGO acronym. By 1941, AGO was acting as a prime subcontractor for the production of Kurt Tank's Focke-Wulf Fw 190 fighter, which made it a prime target for Western Allied strategic bomber forces, which attacked the town ten times.

During the period of the German Democratic Republic Oschersleben was a center of agriculture in the region. Besides some industrial establishments settled there, for example the still existing manufacturer of pumps as well as sugar refineries, iron foundries, breweries, machine shops, and brick works.

Since 2000, the Motopark Oschersleben race track is used in the Deutsche Tourenwagen Masters, World Touring Car Championship (WTCC), and other series. In 2005, the circuit was renamed Motorsport Arena Oschersleben because of an insolvency of the investors.

In 1992, a potato processing plant of the company Agrarfrost was built, that produces French fries and potato chips. The plant processes about 140,000 tons of potatoes a year.

In July 2009 Oschersleben merged with the former municipalities Altbrandsleben, Hornhausen and Schermcke. In January 2010 it absorbed Hadmersleben and Peseckendorf.

== Geography ==
Oschersleben is located near the river Bode, about 40 kilometres (25 mi) southwest of Magdeburg in a region called Magdeburger Börde. The river Bode reaches its northernmost point outside the town. Oschersleben is the most important railway station of the Magdeburg–Halberstadt–Thale line.

=== Divisions ===
The town Oschersleben consists of Oschersleben proper and the following Ortschaften or municipal divisions:

- Alikendorf
- Altbrandsleben
- Ampfurth
- Beckendorf-Neindorf
- Groß Germersleben
- Hordorf
- Hornhausen
- Kleinalsleben
- Klein Oschersleben
- Peseckendorf
- Schermcke
- Stadt Hadmersleben

=== Climate ===
The town lies in the temperate zone and in the rain shadow of the Harz. In this area the long-term annual rainfall average is 489 millimeters (20 inches). Most precipitation here falls in June, averaging around 58 millimeters (2.2 inches). The lowest monthly rainfall in February with 28 mm (1.1 inches).

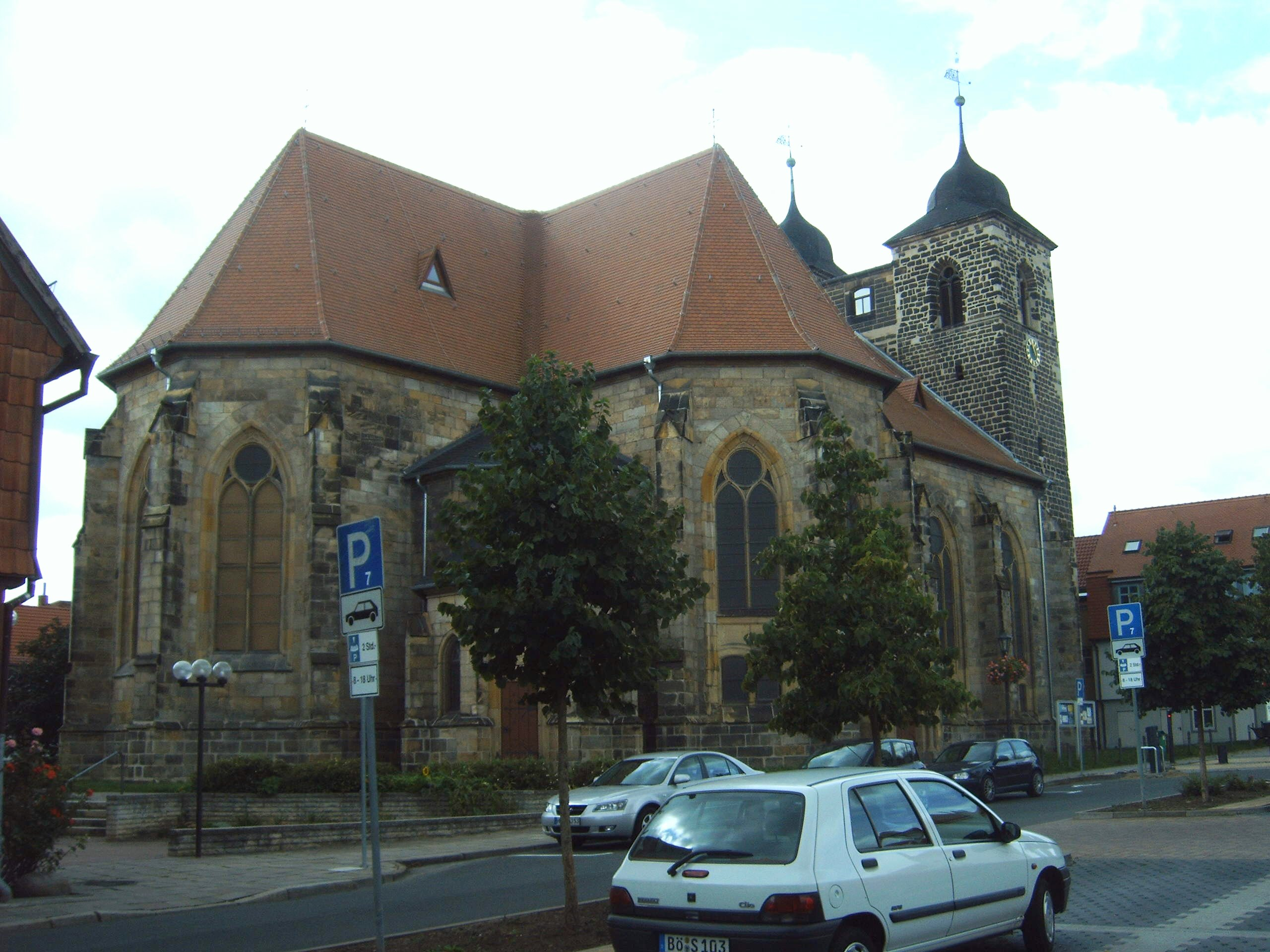
St. Nicolai church in Oschersleben

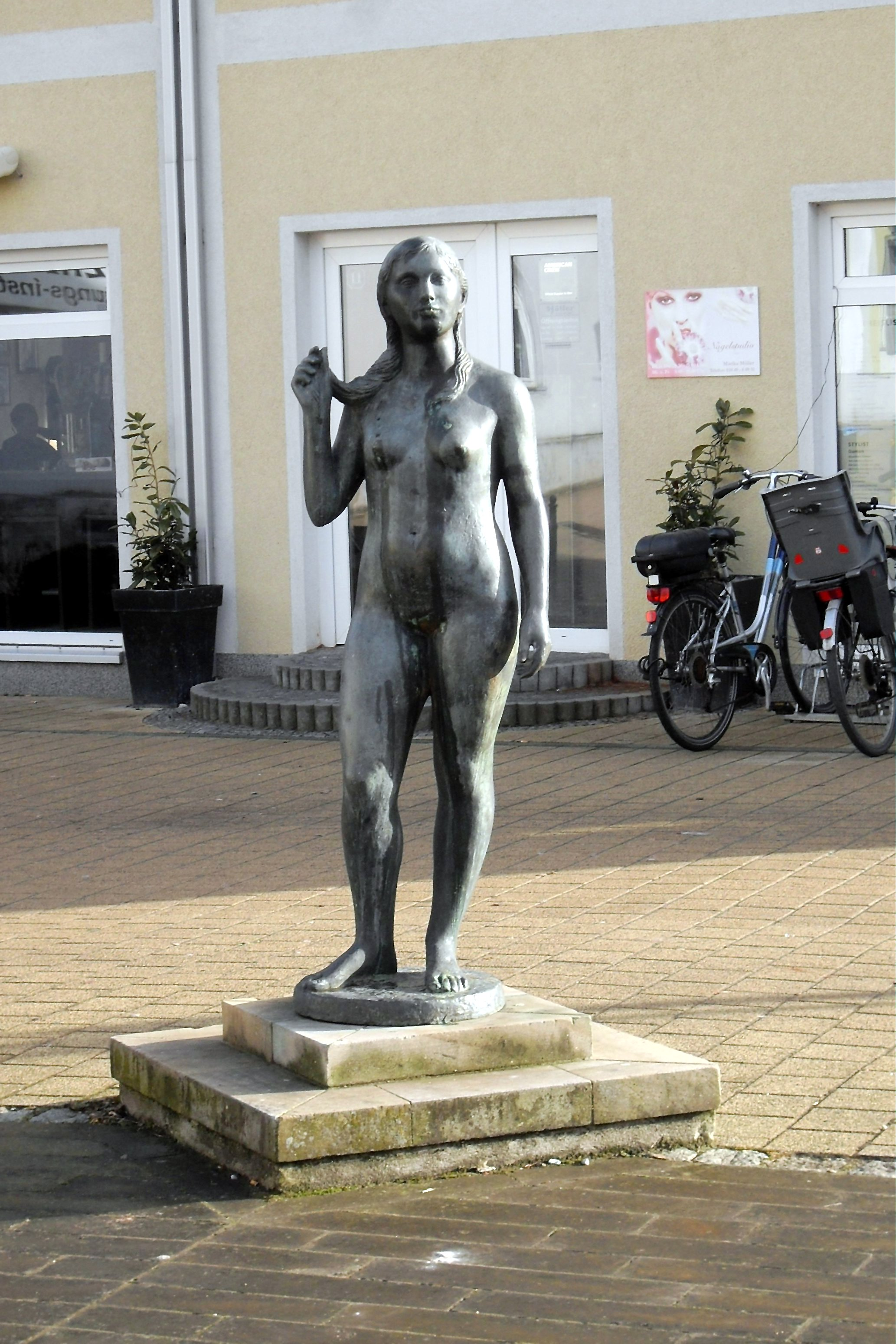
Statue in Oschersleben
