= Harz Run =

The Harz Run (German: Harzquerung) is a fun run and walking event in the Harz mountains of Germany that has been organised since the 1970s by the Wernigerode Skiing Club (Skiklub Wernigerode 1911) and takes place on the last Saturday of April. The main run is an ultra marathon which is 51 kilometres (32 mi) long and crosses the Harz between Wernigerode and Nordhausen in a north-south direction. There is also a 25 km route from Wernigerode to Benneckenstein and a 28 km course from Benneckenstein to Nordhausen.

From its start on the edge of the town of Wernigerode it initially climbs the Hilmersberg and then continues to the Zillierbach Reservoir. After 11.5 km the first drink stop is reached at Neue Hütte. The route forks at Lange at the 20 km point. Whilst the 25 km runners turn off right to Benneckenstein, the ultra marathon runners run straight ahead in a southerly direction. Shortly beyond Trautenstein they are joined by the 28 km runners from Benneckenstein. The route continues via Sophienhof to Netzkater. Next comes the second longest climb to the Poppenberg, whose peak is reached at the 39 km point. The course runs through Neustadt/Harz and Rüdigsdorf to its finish in the Albert Kuntz Stadium at Nordhausen.

The route is quite demanding due to its near-natural course on small tracks and the height difference of 1200 m that has to be overcome.

The instigator for the runs was Herbert Pohl of Wernigerode who died in 1993. In East Germany the organisation of the run was sometimes banned by the authorities. In 2004 the 25th Harzquerung was combined with the 4th German Ultra Marathon Championships.

== Statistics ==
=== Course records ===
- Men: 3:23:47, Karsten Sörensen, 1996
- Women: 4:00:04, Heidrun Peckert, 2005

=== Fastest runner of 2007 ===
- Men: Andreas Schneidewind, 3:37:09
- Women: Nicole Kresse, 4:30:52

=== No. of finishers in 2007 ===
- 51 km: 334 (272 men and 62 women)
- 25 km: 75 (57 men and 18 women)
- 28 km: 68 (51 men and 17 women)

=== List of victors ===
Year	Men	Time	Women	Time
2006	Thomas Drößler	3:38:36	Cornelia Heinze	4:27:17
2005	Thomas Drößler	3:37:30	Heidrun Pecker	4:00:04
2004	Rainer Koch	3:28:55	Nicole Kresse	4:03:33
2003	Thomas Drößler	3:27:34	Heidrun Pecker	4:06:35
2002	Ulrich Grallath	3:31:36	Nele Wild-Wall	4:07:40
