= Harz =

Low mountain range in northern Germany

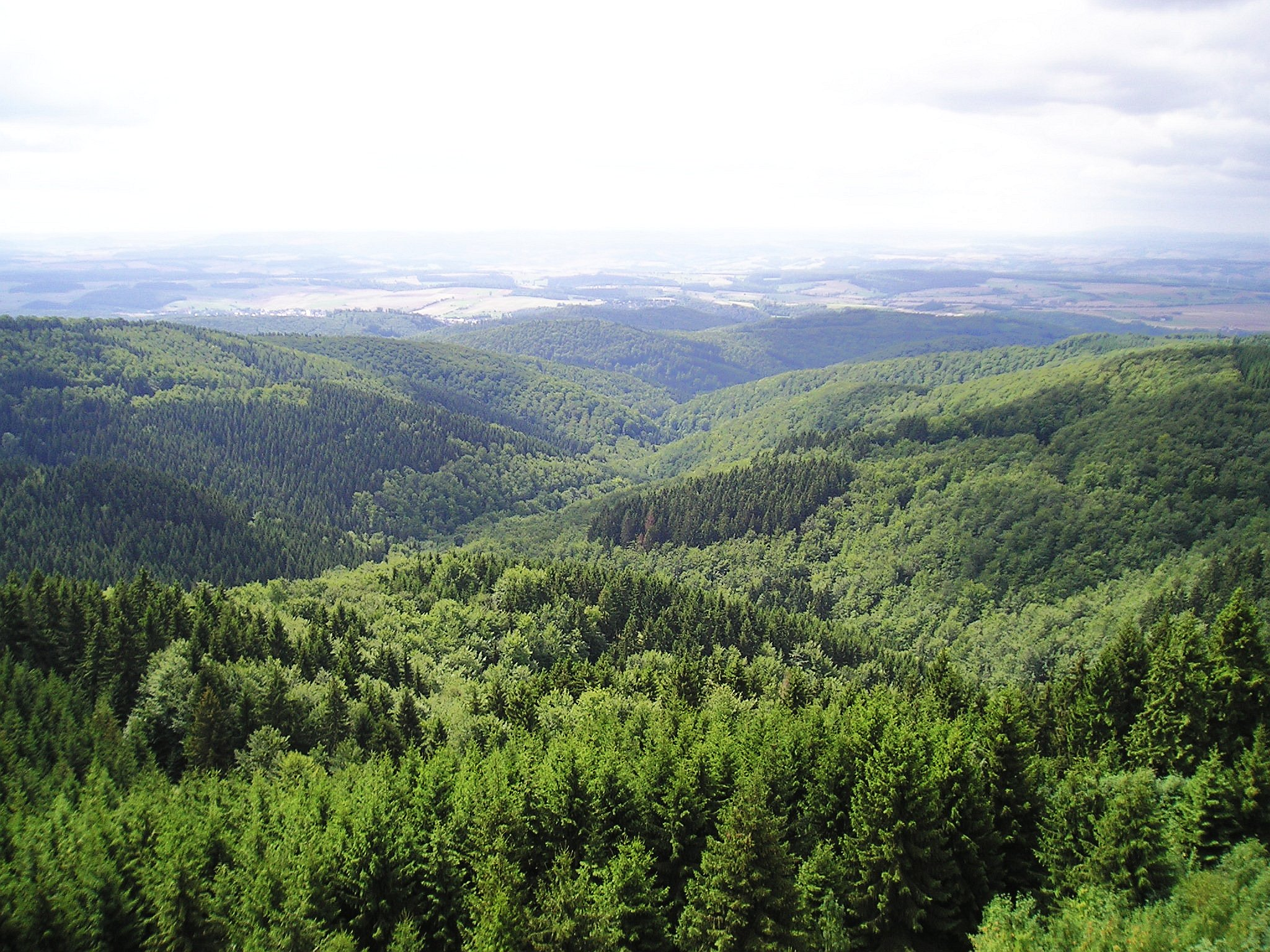

Highest point
- Peak: Brocken
- Elevation: 1,141.2 m (3,744 ft)

Dimensions
- Length: 110 km (68 mi)
- Area: 2,226 km^{2} (859 mi^{2})

Geography
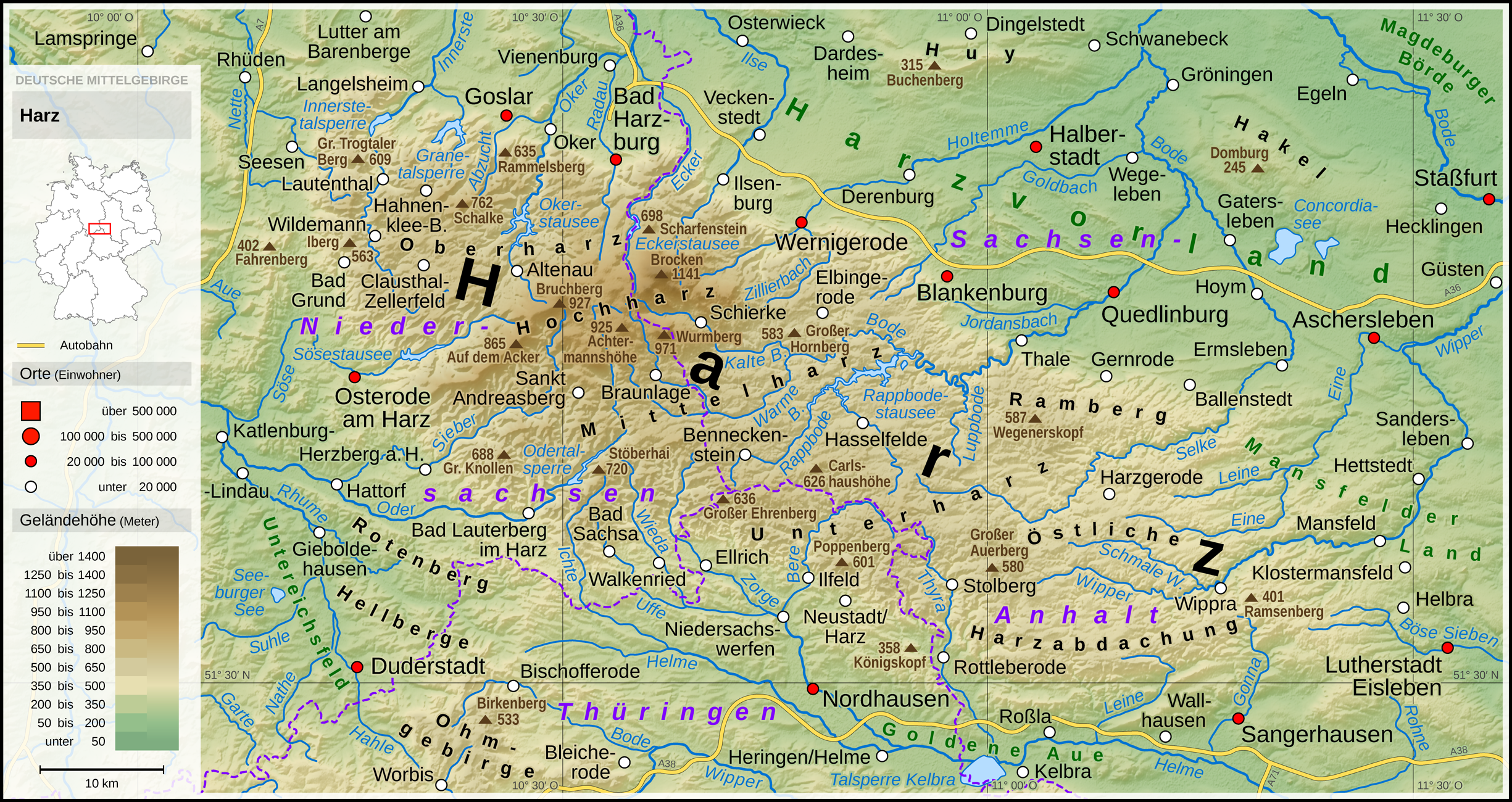
- Topographic map of the Harz Mountains
- States: Germany: Lower Saxony; Saxony-Anhalt; Thuringia
- Range coordinates: 51°45′N 10°38′E
- Parent range: Central Uplands

Geology
- Orogeny: Hercynian
- Rock age(s): oldest rock > 560 million years (Ecker gneiss-educt), youngest pre-quaternary rocks c. 290 million years (Brocken granite)
- Rock type(s): Paleozoic sedimentary, metamorphic and magmatic rocks – mainly slate, grauwacke, granite. Type locality of harzburgite.

The Harz (German: [haːɐ̯ts]), also called the Harz Mountains, is a highland area in northern Germany. It has the highest elevations for that region, and its rugged terrain extends across parts of Lower Saxony, Saxony-Anhalt, and Thuringia. The name Harz derives from the Middle High German word Hardt or Hart (hill forest). The name Hercynia derives from a Celtic name and could refer to other mountain forests, but has also been applied to the geology of the Harz. The Brocken is the highest summit in the Harz with an elevation of 1,141.1 metres (3,744 ft) above sea level. The Wurmberg (971 metres (3,186 ft)) is the highest peak located entirely within the state of Lower Saxony.

== Geography ==
=== Location and extent ===
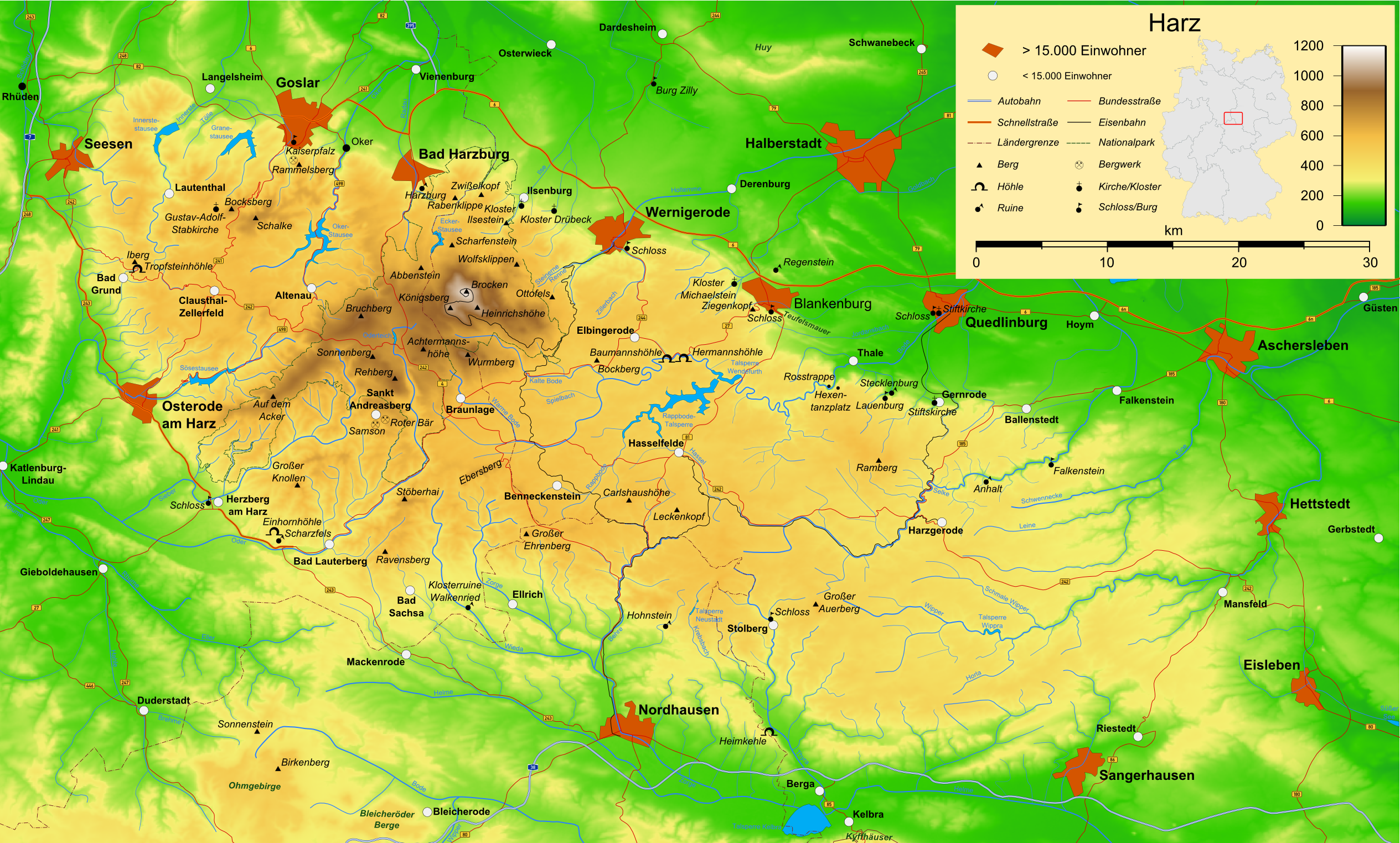
Map of the Harz mountains

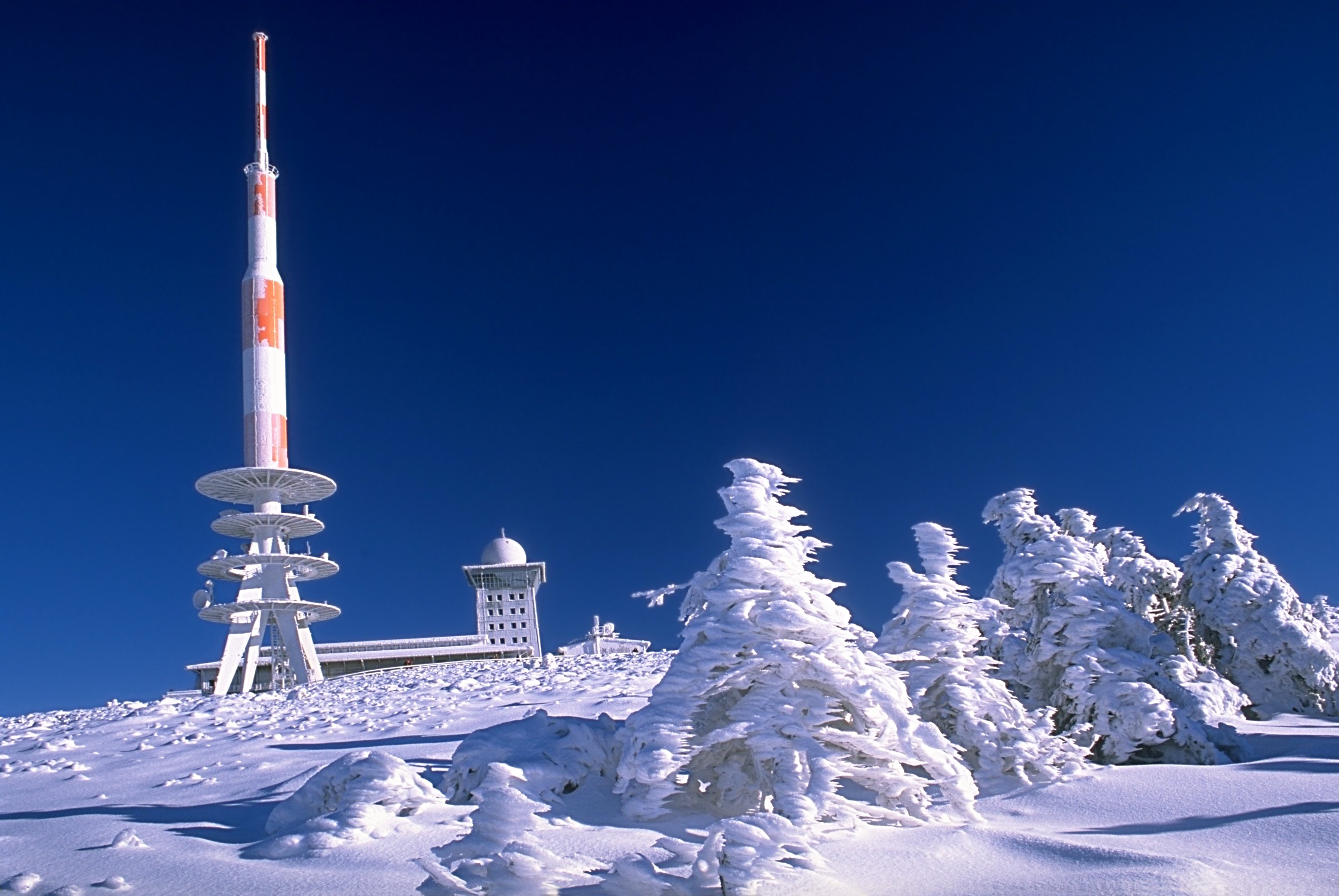
Sender Brocken at the summit in winter

The Harz has a length of 110 kilometres (68 mi), stretching from the town of Seesen in the northwest to Eisleben in the east, and a width of 35 kilometres (22 mi). It occupies an area of 2,226 square kilometres (859 sq mi), and is divided into the Upper Harz (Oberharz) in the northwest, which is up to 800 m high, apart from the 1,100 m high Brocken massif, and the Lower Harz (Unterharz) in the east which is up to around 400 m high and whose plateaus are capable of supporting arable farming.

The following districts (Kreise) fall wholly or partly within the Harz: Goslar and Göttingen in the west, Harz and Mansfeld-Südharz in the north and east, and Nordhausen in the south. The districts of the Upper Harz are Goslar and Göttingen (both in Lower Saxony), whilst the Lower Harz is on the territory of Harz and Mansfeld-Südharz districts (both in Saxony-Anhalt). The Upper Harz is generally higher and features fir forests, whilst the Lower Harz gradually descends into the surrounding area and has deciduous forests interspersed with meadows.

The dividing line between Upper and Lower Harz follows approximately a line from Ilsenburg to Bad Lauterberg, which roughly separates the catchment areas for the Weser (Upper Harz) and Elbe (Lower Harz). Only on the southeastern perimeter of the Upper Harz, which is also called the High Harz (Hochharz) (Goslar, Göttingen and Harz districts), does the mountain range exceed 1,000 m above sea level (NN) on the Brocken massif. Its highest peak is the Brocken (1,141 m), its subsidiary peaks are the Heinrichshöhe (1,044 m) to the southeast and the Königsberg (1,023 m) to the southwest. Other prominent hills in the Harz are the Acker-Bruchberg ridge (927 m), the Achtermannshöhe (925 m) and the Wurmberg (971 m) near Braunlage. In the far east, the mountains merge into the East Harz foothills (Harz district, Saxony-Anhalt), which are dominated by the Selke Valley. Part of the south Harz lies in the Thuringian district of Nordhausen.

The Harz National Park is located in the Harz; the protected area covers the Brocken and surrounding wilderness area. Approximately 600,000 people live in towns and villages of the Harz Mountains.

=== Rivers and lakes ===
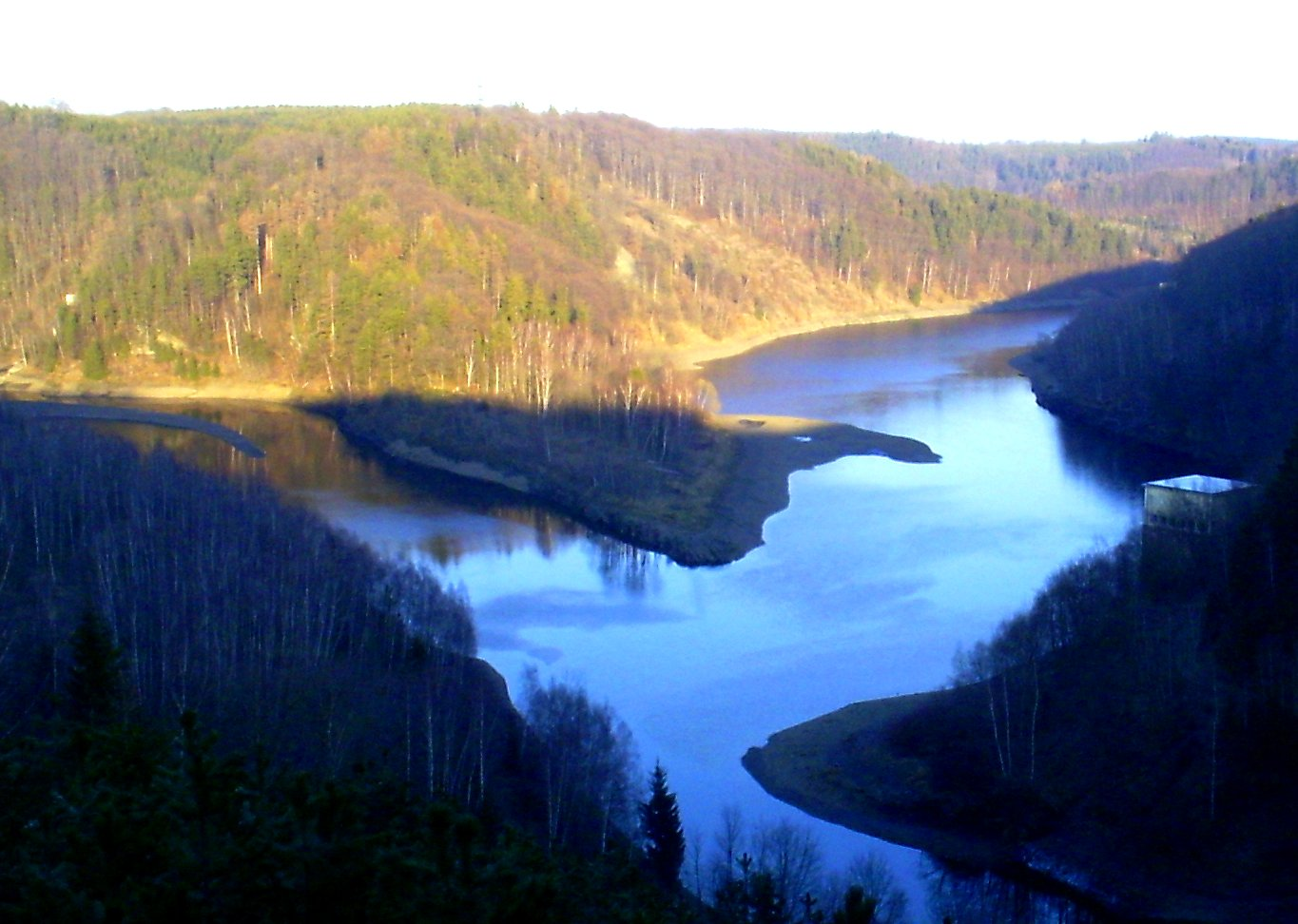
Reservoir behind the Wendefurth Dam

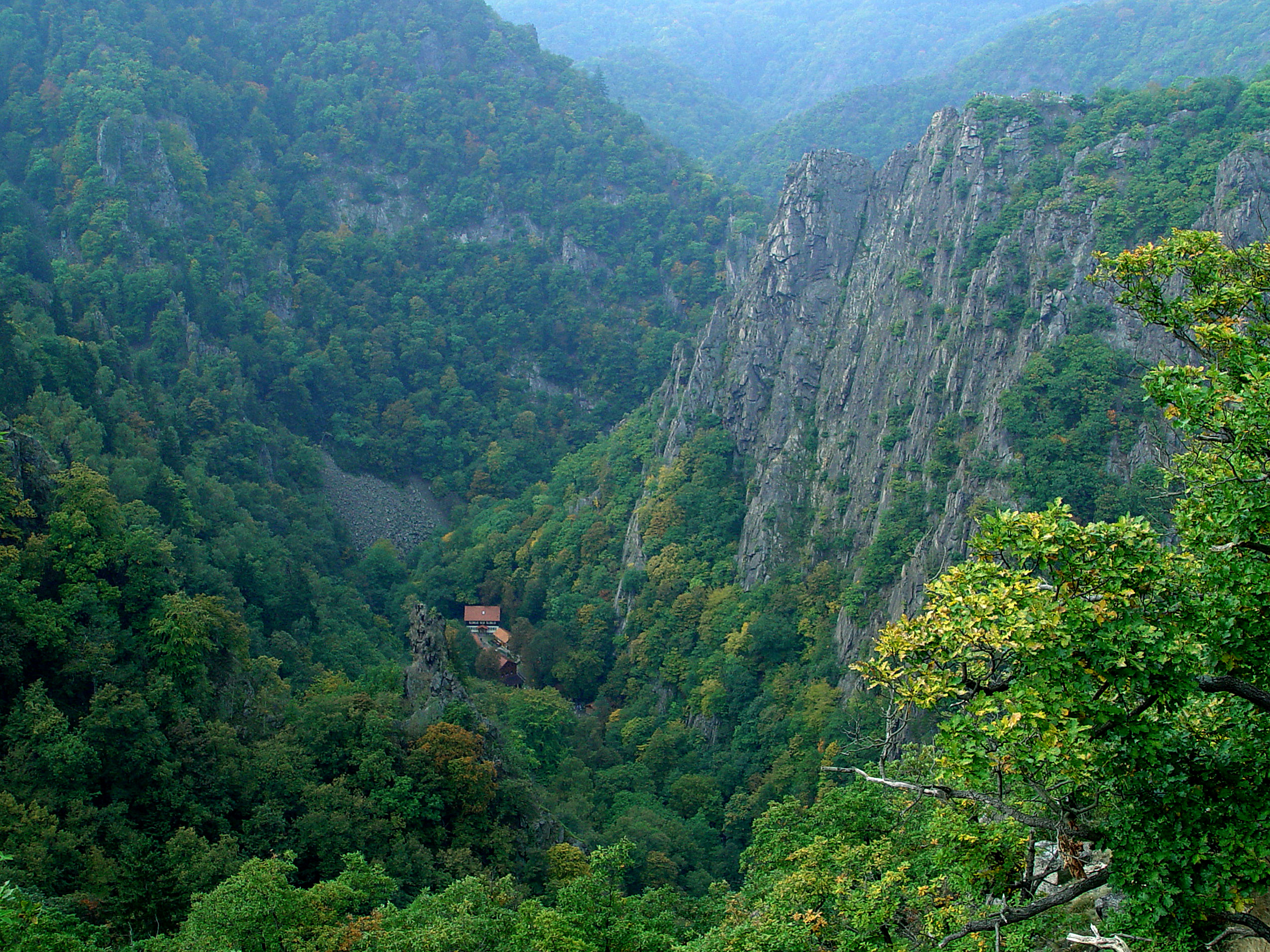
Bode Gorge

Because of the heavy rainfall in the region the rivers of the Harz Mountains were dammed from an early date. Examples of such masonry dams are the two largest: the Oker Dam and the Rappbode Dam. The clear, cool water of the mountain streams was also dammed by early mountain folk to form the various mountain ponds of the Upper Harz waterways, such as the Oderteich.

The 17 dams in the Harz block a total of twelve rivers. Because the Harz is one of the regions of Germany that experiences the most rainfall, its water power was used from early times. Today the dams are primarily used to generate electricity, to provide drinking water, to prevent flooding and to supply water in times of scarcity. Modern dam-building began in the Harz with the construction of the Söse Valley Dam, which was built between 1928 and 1931. The dams of the Upper Harz lakes are some of the oldest dams in Germany that are still in operation.

The largest rivers in the Harz are the Innerste, the Oker and the Bode in the north; the Wipper in the east; and the Oder in the south. The Innerste merges into the Leine and its tributaries are the Nette and the Grane. The rivers Radau, Ecker and Ilse all discharge into the Oker. The Hassel, the Selke and the Holtemme (whose main tributary is the Zillierbach) flow into the Bode. The Wipper is fed by the Eine. The Rhume is joined by the Söse and the Oder; the latter being fed by the Sieber. The Zorge, the Wieda and the Uffe all flow into the Helme.

=== Hills ===
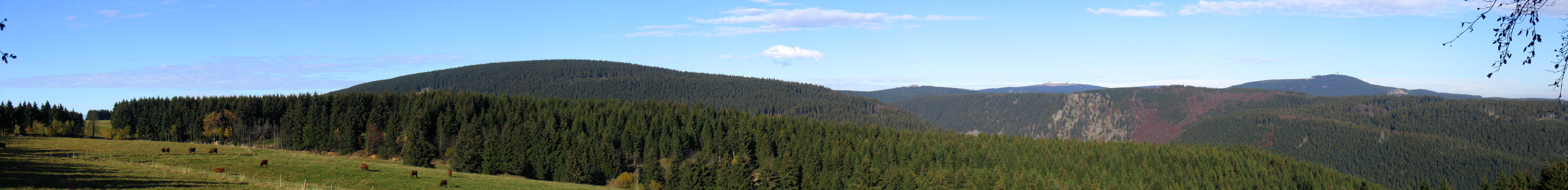
Panorama in the Harz Mountains. From left to right: the peaks of the Rehberg, the Achtermannshöhe, the Brocken and the Wurmberg.

=== Climate ===
Climatically a hill range has lower temperatures and higher levels of precipitation than the surrounding land. The Harz is characterised by regular precipitation throughout the year. Exposed to westerly winds from the Atlantic, heavy with rain, the windward side of the mountains has up to 1,600 mm of rain annually (West Harz, Upper Harz, High Harz); in contrast, the leeward side only receives an average of 600 mm of precipitation per annum (East Harz, Lower Harz, Eastern Harz foothills).

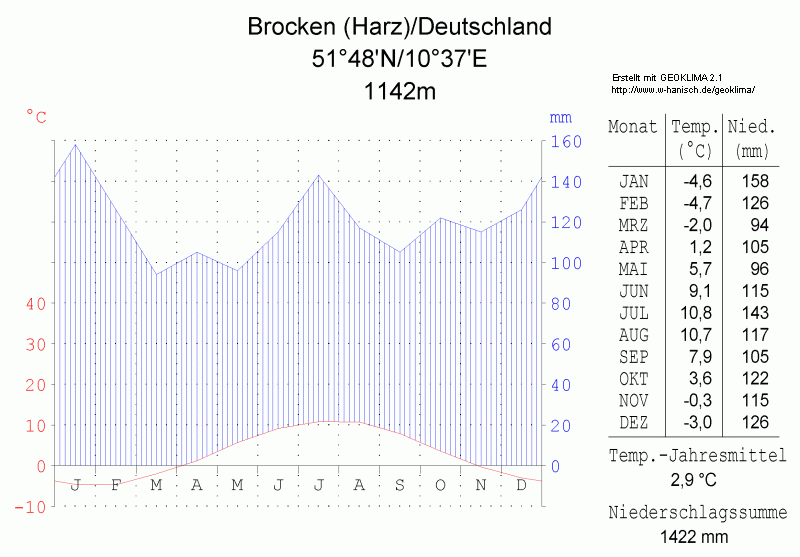
Brocken (windward)

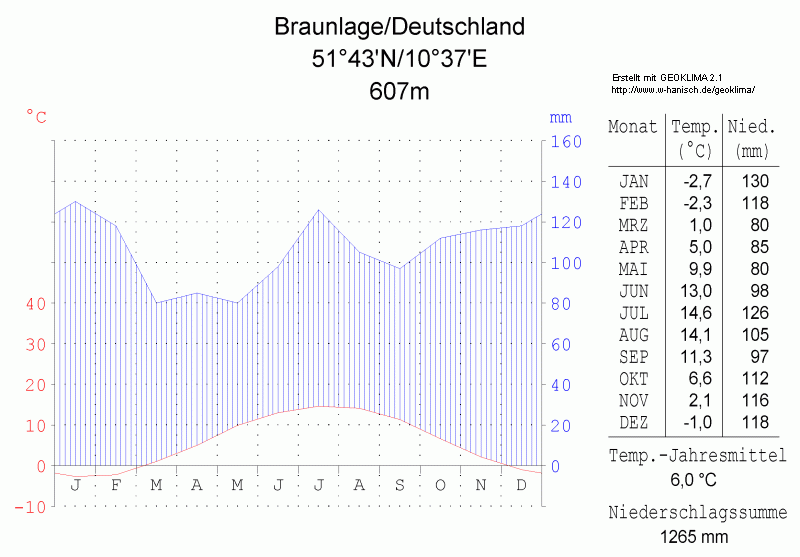
Braunlage (windward)

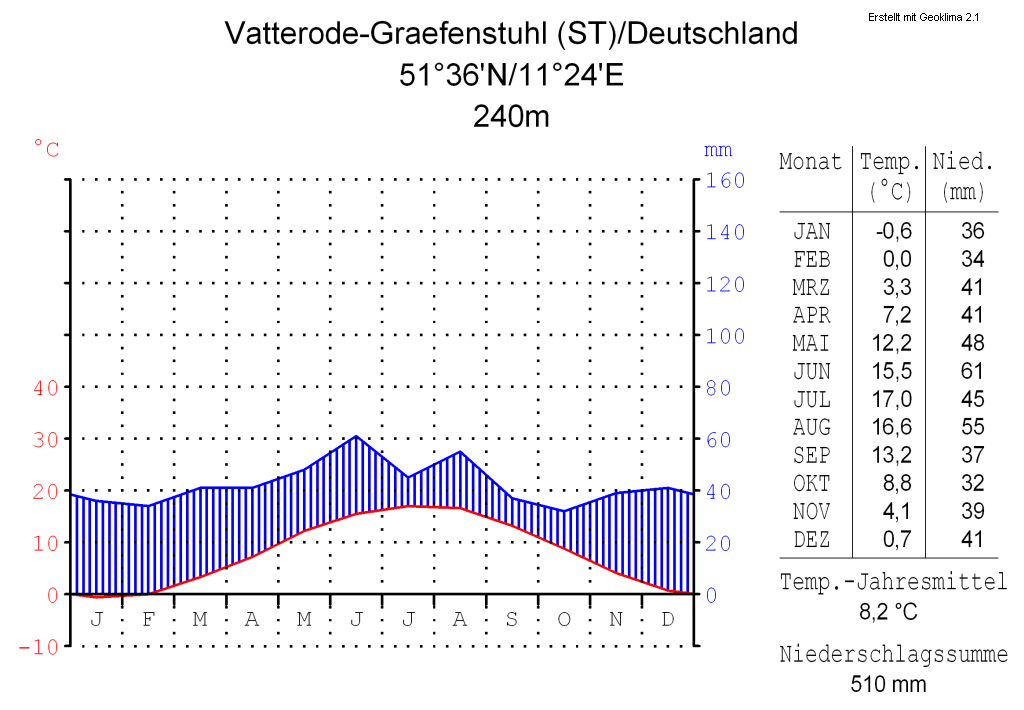
Mansfeld (leeward)

== Geology and pedology ==
=== Origins ===
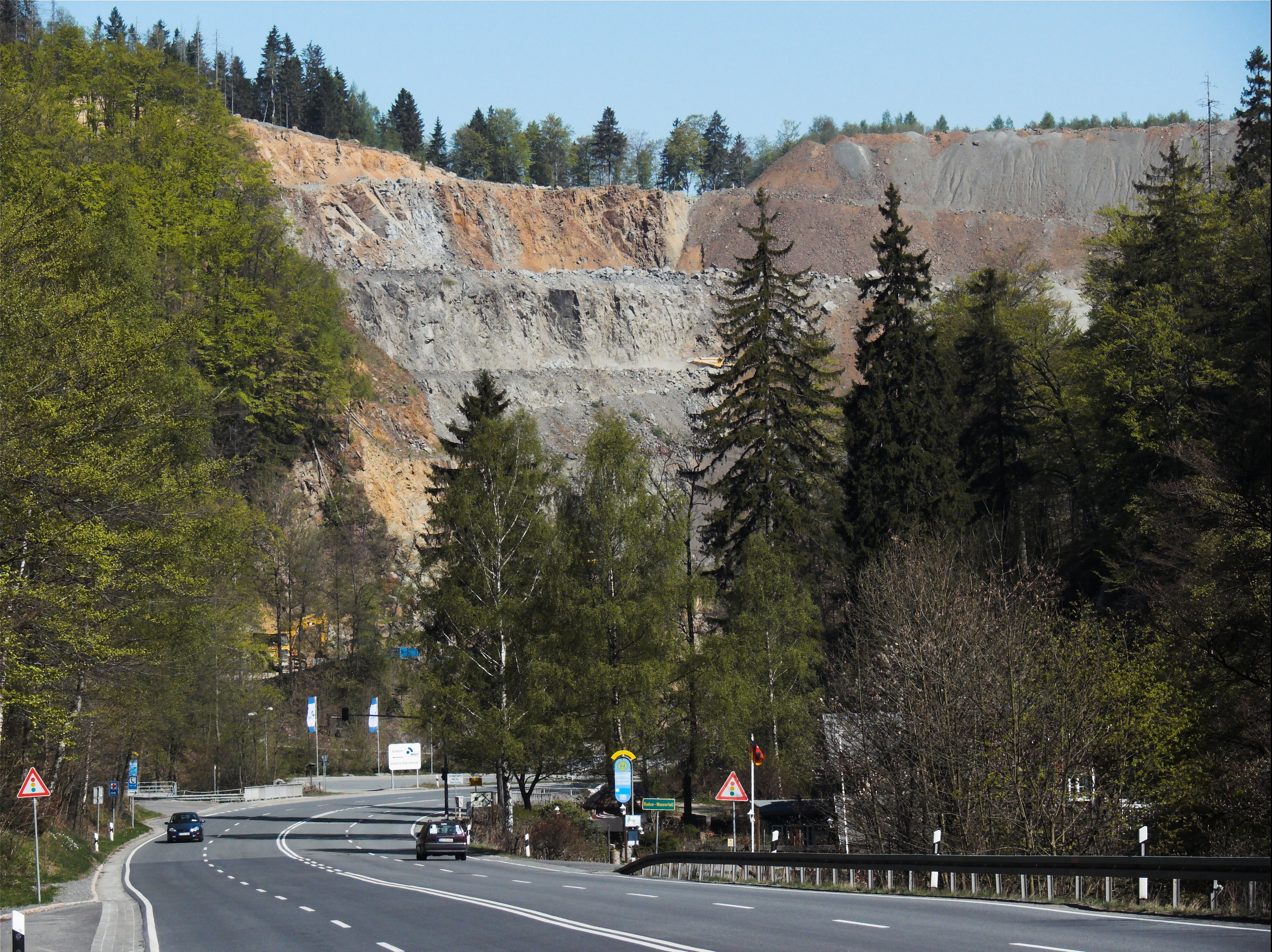
Gabbro Quarry near Bad Harzburg

The Harz is the most geologically diverse of the German Mittelgebirge, although it is overwhelmingly dominated by base-poor rocks. The most common rocks lying on the surface are argillaceous shales, slaty (geschieferte) greywackes and granite intrusions in the shape of two large igneous rock masses or plutons. The Gießen-Harz surface layer of the Rhenohercynian zone, which is widespread in the Harz, consists mainly of flysch. Well-known and economically important are the limestone deposits around Elbingerode and the Gabbro of Bad Harzburg. The landscapes of the Harz are characterised by steep mountain ridges, stone runs, relatively flat plateaus with many raised bogs and long, narrow V-shaped valleys, of which the Bode Gorge, the Oker and Selke valleys are the best known. A representative cross-section of all the Harz rocks is displayed on the Jordanshöhe near Sankt Andreasberg near the car park (see photo).

The formation and geological folding of the Harz hills began during a prominent phase of the Palaeozoic era, in the course of the Hercynian mountain building of the Carboniferous period, about 350 to 250 million years ago. At that time in the history of the Earth, numerous high mountains appeared in Western Europe, including the Fichtel Mountains and Rhenish Massif. They were, however, heavily eroded due to their height (up to 4 km) and were later covered over by Mesozoic rocks. From the Early Cretaceous and into Late Cretaceous times the Harz was uplifted in a single block by tectonic movements and, particularly during the Tertiary period, the younger overlying strata were eroded and the underlying base rock left standing as low mountains. The most important uplift movements were during the sub-Hercynian phase (83 mya), when the northern edge was steeply tilted. This formed a fault zone on the northern border of the Harz (the Northern Harz Boundary Fault or Harznordrandverwerfung).

The Harz is a fault-block range, that rises abruptly from the surrounding lowlands in the west and northeast and gradually dips towards the south. It is dissected by numerous deep valleys. North of the hills lie the Cretaceous layers of the sub-Hercynian depression in the rolling hills of the Harz Foreland; south of the Harz, Permian sediments lie flat on southwest-dipping Palaeozoic beds.

As a result of the northern fault zone and the vertical or, sometimes even overfolded, geological strata, the geology of the Harz sometimes changes frequently within a relatively small area of just a few square kilometres. As a consequence of this it is also referred to as the "Classic Geological Square Mile" (Klassischen Quadratmeile der Geologie).

There is a room devoted to geology in the Harz Museum in Wernigerode.

== Nature ==
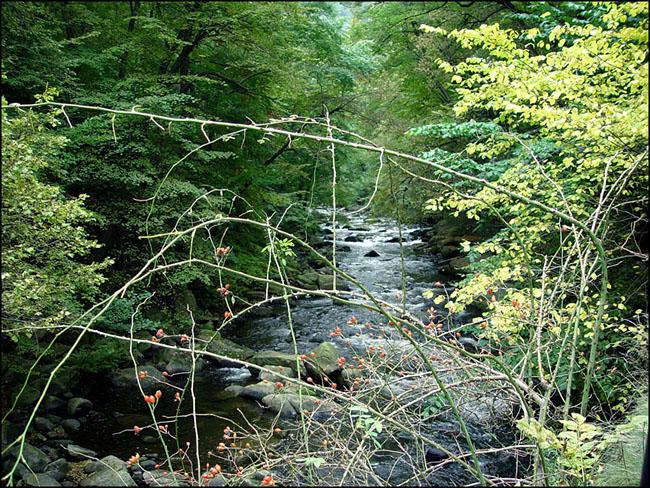
Bode Gorge

=== Flora ===
The vegetation of the Harz mountains is divided into six altitudinal zones:

- Subalpine zone: Brocken summit, over 1,000 m above sea level (NN)
- Altimontane zone: highest areas (except the Brocken summit) between 850 and 1,000 m above NN
- Mean montane zone: higher areas between 750 and 850 m above NN
- Montane zone: medium height areas between 525 and 750 m above NN
- Submontane zone: lower areas between 300 and 525 m above NN
- Colin zone: areas around the edge of the Harz between 250 and 300 m above NN

==== Types of woods ====
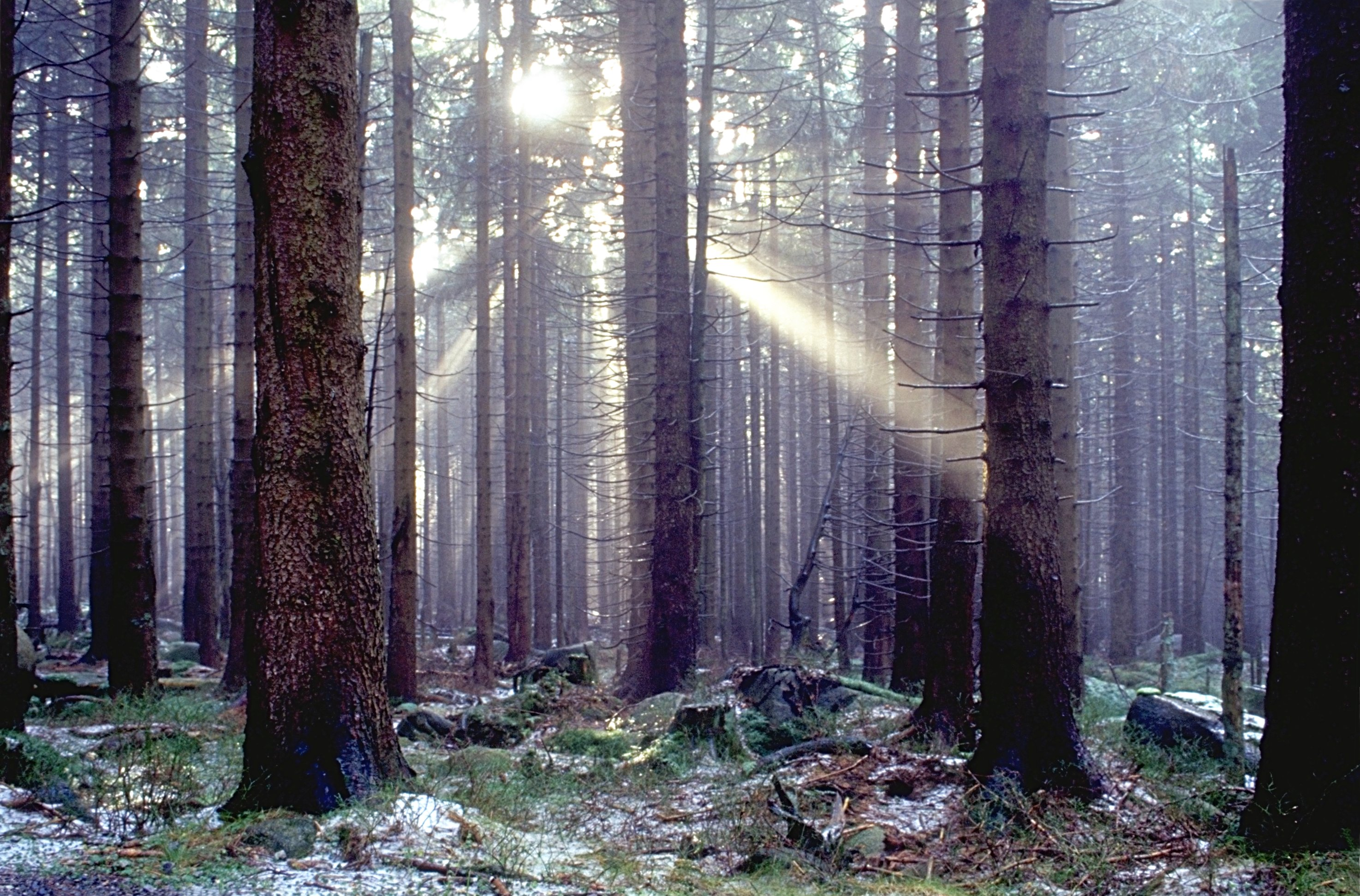
Spruce woods in the Harz

===== Beech woods =====
From the edge of the Harz to 700 m above sea level beech woods dominate, especially the wood-rush beech woods on locations poorly supplied with nutrients where the common beech (Fagus sylvatica) is often the only tree species. In lower, drier locations the English oak (Quercus robur) and sessile oak (Quercus petraea) occur as well. sycamore trees (Acer pseudoplatanus) may be found growing in wetter places. During times of decay and rejuvenation when there is plenty of light, light-dependent pioneers such as rowan (Sorbus aucuparia), silver birch (Betula pendula) and pussy willow (Salix caprea) play a role. Melic grass beech woods are found in the few places where there is an abundance of nutrients and bases, e. g. over dolerite and gneiss formations, and they have a vegetation layer rich in variety and luxuriant growth. Here, too, the common beech dominates, mixed, for example, with sycamore, ash (Fraxinus excelsior), hornbeam (Carpinus betulus) and Scots elm (Ulmus glabra). As a result of the increasingly continental climate on the eastern edge of the Harz, the common beech gives way to mixed forests of sessile oak.

===== Mixed woods =====
At intermediate heights of between 700 and 800 m above sea level, mixed woods of spruce (Picea abies) and common beech would predominantly be found under natural conditions. However, apart from a few remnants, these were supplanted a long time ago by spruce stands as a result of deliberate forest management. Sycamore trees are also found in these woods.

===== Spruce woods =====
Spruce woods thrive in the highest locations from about 800 m to the tree line at around 1,000 m above sea level. These woods are also home to some deciduous trees such as rowan, silver and downy birches (Betula pendula and Betula pubescens) and willows (Salix spp.). Conditions of high humidity foster an environment rich in mosses and lichens. In spite of the near-natural habitat there are only a few, indigenous, genetically adapted (autochthonous) spruce trees. Wood-reed spruce woods dominate. A well developed ground vegetation thrives on their moderately rocky and fresh, but certainly not wet, soils, characterised in appearance especially by grasses such as shaggy wood-reed (Calamagrostis villosa) and wavy hair-grass (Avenella flexuosa). The soils in the higher regions are, as in most of the Harz, comparatively poor in nutrients and bases, so that only a few herbaceous plants occur here, such as heath bedstraw (Galium saxatile). For that reason it is more the ferns, mosses, lichens and fungi that, in addition to spruce trees, characterise these woods. Boulders and stone runs occur in the areas of weather-resistant rock in the high (alti-)montane and montane zones – these are extreme habitats for vegetation. Due to the lack of soil material, only weak, straggly, very open spruce woods thrive here. They have an especially high variety of trees and allow more room of light-loving species such as silver birch, rowan, sycamore, willow and dwarf bushes such as the blueberry (Vaccinium myrtillus). Mosses and ferns are also common here. One unusual species is the Carpathian birch (Betula pubescens subsp. carpatica). Bog-spruce woods are found around the raised bogs on marshy and boggy soils. In these sorts of places spruce woods can, in exceptional cases, also form the natural woodland in lower down the mountains. These wet, moorland woods have a high proportion of peat mosses (Sphagnum spp.). The ground vegetation may also have a rich proliferation of low bushes such as cowberry (Vaccinium vitis-idaea). Clumps of purple moor grass (Molinia caerulea) are also typical of this type of woodland habitat. The characteristic species of fungi in natural spruce woods are Phellinus viticola and prunes and custard (Tricholomopsis decora). Ravine (Schluchtwald), riparian (Auwald) and river source (Quellwald) woods only occur in small areas. In these places the common beech gives way to hardier deciduous species such as sycamore, large-leaved lime (Tilia platyphyllos), Scots elm or ash. The herbaceous layer is similar to that of the better-nourished beech woods. Notable species amongst the plant communities here include the Alpine blue-sow-thistle (Cicerbita alpina), perennial honesty (Lunaria rediviva), hard shield fern (Polystichum aculeatum) and long beech fern (Phegopteris connectilis).

==== Raised bogs ====
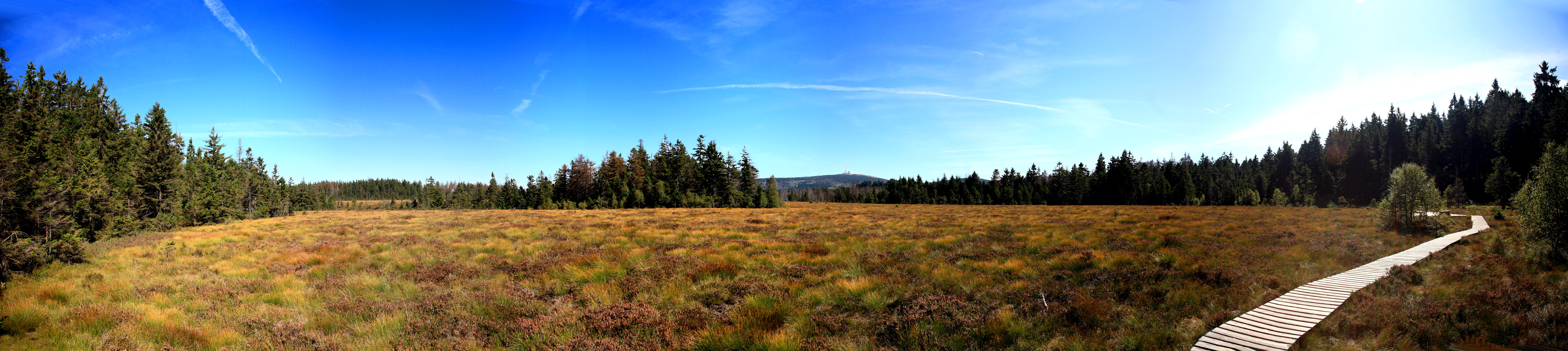
Torfhaus Moor

The raised bogs in the Harz are some of the best preserved in central Europe. They were formed at the end of the last ice age about 10,000 years ago. A significant proportion of the vegetation on these raised bogs is made up of peat mosses (Sphagnum spp.). The flarks (Schlenken) and the hummocks (Bulten) are home to different species of flora. In the flarks, for example, Sphagnum cuspidatum is found, whereas the hummocks are preferred by Sphagnum magellanicum. The blanket of peat moss is penetrated by dwarf bushes such as cowberry and blueberry. Bog-rosemary (Andromeda polifolia) is a relict of the ice age. Other such ice age plants include the dwarf birch (Betula nana) and few-flowered sedge (Carex pauciflora). Cranberries (Vaccinium oxicoccus) bloom from May to June. The black crowberry (Empetrum nigrum) may also be seen amongst those bearing black fruit. Common heather (Calluna vulgaris) grows on the drier hummocks and occasionally the cross-leaved heath (Erica tetralix) may be found. Typical grasses are the sheathed cottongrass (Eriophorum vaginatum), known for its bright, white clusters of fruit and deergrass (Scirpus cespitosus), which is rust-red in the autumn. One fascinating moorland plant is the round-leaved sundew (Drosera rotundifolia). Bog or northern bilberry (Vaccinium uliginosum) grows on the drier margins of the bog.

=== Fauna ===
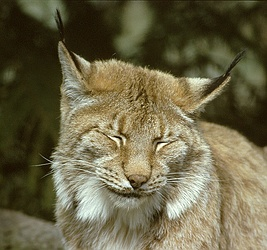
The Eurasian lynx – once again found living wild in the Harz

A multitude of wild animals live in the beech forests of the Harz Mountains. Over 5,000 species, most of them insects, have their home in these woods. They include many species that help to decompose leaves and work them into the soil and ground cover, including springtails, oribatid mites, woodlice, roundworms, millipedes, earthworms and snails. Characteristic breeding birds in the beech woods, with their abundance of dead wood, are the black woodpecker (Dryocopus martius) and stock dove (Columba oenas). An indication of the natural state of the beech woods in the Harz is the return of the black stork (Ciconia nigra). This shy and susceptible resident of richly diverse deciduous and mixed forest has become very rare in central Europe due to increasing disturbance of its habitat (caused by a lack of old trees and natural brooks). Through improvements to its habitat, including the renaturalisation of waterways and the creation of relatively undisturbed peaceful areas, the black stork population has now recovered. A typical mammal of such deciduous woods is the European wildcat (Felis silvestris), that has established a stable population in the Harz. It prefers the diverse wooded areas, which offer a rich variety of food.

The animal wildlife of the mixed beech and spruce woods is also diverse. Species that thrive in mixed forest are especially at home. For example, the mixed mountain forest is the natural habitat of the capercaillie (Tetrao urogallus). The Tengmalm's owl (Aegolius funereus) may also be found here. It breeds almost exclusively in black woodpecker holes in old beeches, and needs, unlike the spruce woods, more open beech forest with its higher population of small mammals in its search for food. For cover, however, it prefers the darker, denser spruce trees.

A large number of the animals that live in natural spruce forest are suited to the special conditions of life in the higher parts of the Harz. Typical residents amongst the bird population include the crested tit (Parus cristatus), goldcrest and firecrest (Regulus regulus and Regulus ignicapillus), siskin (Carduelis spinus), treecreeper (Certhia familiaris), coal tit (Parus ater) and crossbill (Loxia curvirostra). Special mention should be made here of the pygmy owl (Glaucidium passerinum) which is threatened with extinction and which lives in the submontane to subalpine zones within mixed and pine forests interspersed with open areas. They prefer spruce woods for breeding, but feed in more open stands of trees or on open moorland. Like the black stork, the pygmy owl had long since disappeared from the Harz, but returned in the 1980s of its own volition, as its ancestral homeland once again became more natural, so that there was sufficient food to support it (insects, small mammals and small birds) as well as standing dead wood (spruce trees with woodpecker holes).

In addition to the many species of birds, there is a range of large butterflies in the various spruce woods that, outside of the Harz, are seriously endangered or simply non-existent. Two species will be mentioned here as examples. Gnophos sordarius occurs in old, open wood-reed spruce forest, sometimes in connection with stone runs or bog spruce forests; Enthephria caesiata is a native of the bilberry-rich bog spruce woods.

Only a few animals are able to survive the extreme conditions of the raised bogs. Examples of these are the Alpine emerald dragonfly (Somatochlora alpestris), which only occurs in Lower Saxony in the Harz, and is endangered in Germany, and the Subarctic darner (Aeshna subarctica), a damselfly which is threatened with extinction.

Rocks and stone runs are important habitat components for the peregrine falcon (Falco peregrinus) and ring ouzel (Turdus torquatus). The peregrine, which is threatened with extinction here, needs steep rock outcrops with little vegetation. After its population had died out in the Harz, a breeding pair was re-established in the region. A crucial contribution has been made by extensive efforts to promote quiet areas in the ancestral breeding grounds of this shy species. Since 1980, a breeding pair has settled in the eastern Harz as the result of a wildlife reintroduction project. The ring ouzel prefers semi-open stone runs and lightly wooded transition zones between treeless raised bogs and forests. The Harz is home to one of its few, isolated breeding areas in central Europe. Its main distribution area extends across northwest Europe, including large parts of England and Scotland, as well as the high mountains of southern and eastern Europe.

The waterways, with their distinct mountain stream character, play an important role right across the Harz. In comparison with the other natural regions of Lower Saxony, they are still very natural and varied, and the water is very clean. As a result of the high water velocity of the Harz streams, flowers rarely gain a foothold in the water. Even the animals in these streams need to be well suited to high velocities. Only a few species, such as fish, swim actively against the stream. The most common species are brown trout (Salmo trutta morpha fario) and bullhead (Cottus gobio). Much richer in variety, by contrast, is the range of species in the system of crevices under the streambed. In addition to the insects and fish hatchlings that thrive here, may be found protozoons, flatworms (Turbellaria) and water mites (Hygrobatoidea). Other species of animals cling fast to the stones, e.g. caddis fly larvae (Trichoptera) and snails, or can only live in the reduced water velocities on the bed of the stream or on stones by having flat body shapes, e.g. stonefly larvae. In the calmer parts of the stream, behind stones or in blankets of moss, there are also water beetles (Hydrophilidae) and small shrimp-like amphipods.

Occasionally the golden-ringed dragonfly (Cordulegaster boltoni) and beautiful demoiselle (Calopteryx virgo), a type of damselfly, can be seen by streams in the Harz.

The dipper (Cinclus cinclus), which is found everywhere on Harz streams, occurs almost exclusively in the highlands. Its habitat is very fast-flowing, clear mountain streams with wooded banks. It can dive and run under water along the stream bed. It turns stones over in its search for food. The grey wagtail (Motacilla cinerea) also uses the rich food supplies of the mountain brooks.

In 2000, the lynx was successfully reintroduced by the Harz National Park, and it has since fitted well into the ecology of the region. Through specific conservation measures in past years, the retreat of the bat population in the Harz has been halted. Amongst the mammals that may be hunted are the red deer, roe deer, wild boar and mouflon.

== History ==
The Harz was first mentioned as Hartingowe in an 814 deed by the Carolingian King Louis the Pious. Settlement within the mountains began only 1000 years ago, as in ancient times dense forests made the region almost inaccessible. The suffix -rode (from German: roden, to stub) denotes a place where woodland had been cleared to develop a settlement.

The year 968 saw the discovery of silver deposits near the town of Goslar, and mines became established in the following centuries throughout the mountains. During the Middle Ages, ore from this region was exported along trade routes to far-flung places, such as Mesopotamia. The wealth of the region declined after these mines became exhausted in the early 19th century. People abandoned the towns for a short time, but prosperity eventually returned with tourism. Between 1945 and 1990, the Inner German border ran through the Harz, the west belonging to the Federal Republic of Germany (West Germany) and the east to the German Democratic Republic (East Germany). Today the Harz forms a popular tourist destination for summer hiking as well as winter sports.

=== Pre-history and early history ===
About 700,000 to 350,000 years ago Homo erectus hunted in and around the Harz near Bilzingsleben (Thuringia), Hildesheim and Schöningen (Lower Saxony). The Neanderthals entered the stage about 250,000 years ago and hunted aurochs, bison, brown bear and cave bear, mammoths, rhinos, horses, reindeer, forest elephants and other animals in the Harz region. Tools used by Neanderthals were discovered inter alia in the Einhorn Cave in the southern Harz (100,000 years ago) and in the Rübeland Caves. Finds of birch pitch near Aschersleben on the northern edge of the Harz point to the use of this prehistoric adhesive by Neanderthals about 50,000 years ago. The Upper Palaeolithic Revolution, about 40,000 years ago, saw Homo sapiens move from Africa into Europe, including to the Harz region, where they appear to have ousted the Neanderthals and subsequently settled here.

Many discoveries in the Harz, such as the bronze club of Thale, which was found by the Roßtrappe, could indicate an earlier Celtic occupation of the Harz.

=== Middle Ages ===
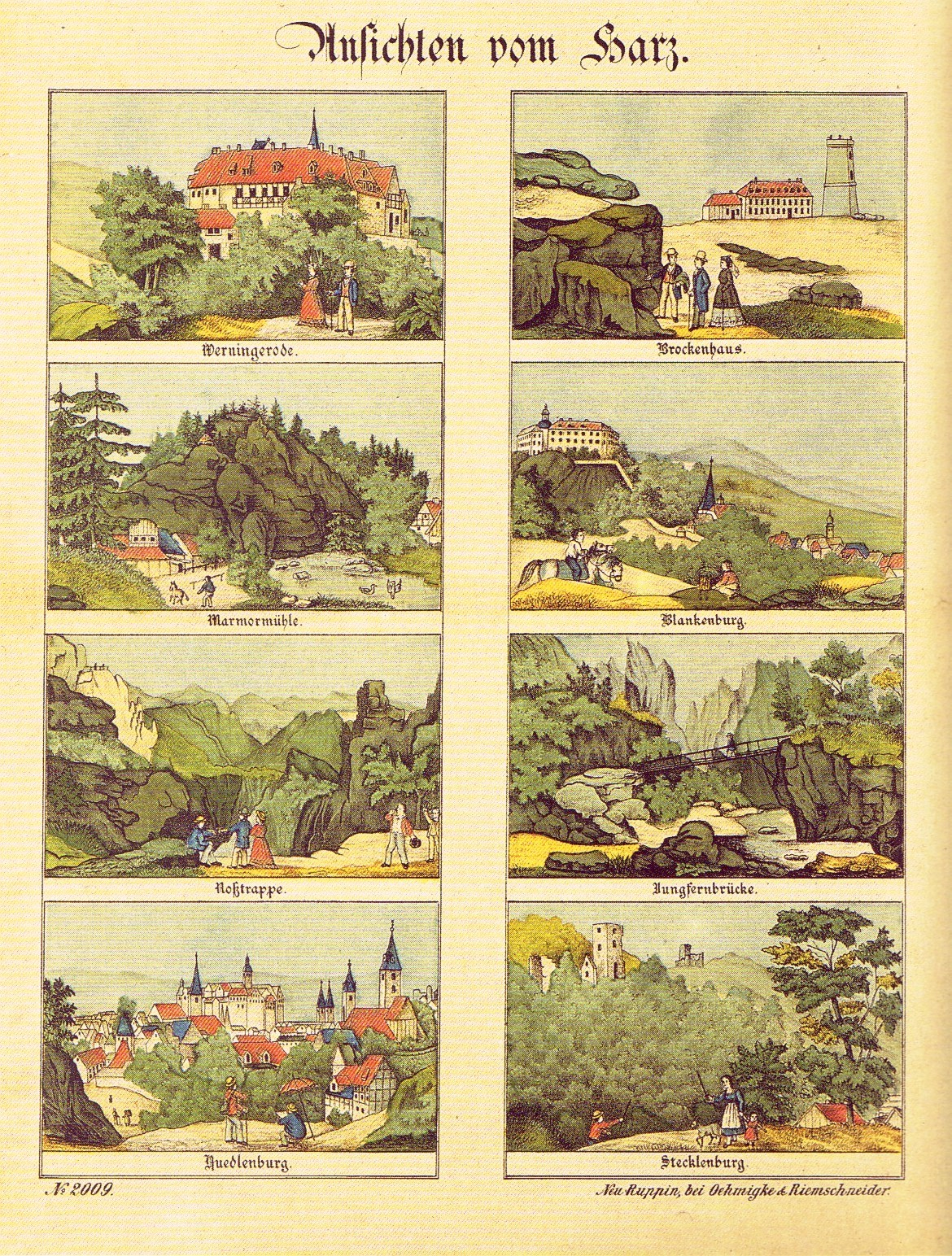
Harz 1852

The Harzgau itself was first mentioned in a deed by the Emperor, Louis the Pious, from the year 814, in which it was referred to by its High German form, Hartingowe. According to the Fulda annals of 852, the Harzgau was occupied by the Harudes and after whom the Harudengau (Harudorum pagus) was named. Harud, from which Hard, Hart and Harz are derived, means forest or forested mountains, and the Harudes were the residents or dwellers in the Harud.

Of more recent origin are settlements whose names end in –rode, a suffix that is first discernable in the Harzgau from the mid-9th century. Where the founders of these villages came from is unknown.

Charlemagne declared the Harz a restricted imperial forest or Reichsbannwald. The Saxon Mirror (Sachsenspiegel), the oldest German law book (Rechtsbuch), probably published around 1220/30 at Falkenstein Castle in the Selke valley, later made the imperial restriction clear: "Whoever rides through the Harz Forest, must unstring his bow and crossbow and keep dogs on a line – only crowned royalty [gekrönte Häupter] are allowed to hunt here". Eike von Repkow's Sachsenspiegel which, for centuries, formed the basis on which German law was administered, described the Harz as a place "where wild animals are guaranteed protection in the king's restricted forests". There were three restricted forests, so described, in the state of Saxony, where there was no longer unfettered access for everyone.

This ban did not last forever. Mining, ironworks, water management, increasing settlement, woodland clearances, cattle driving, agriculture, and later tourism all undermined this imperial protection over the centuries.

As early as 1224, monks who had settled in Walkenried bought extensive tracts of forest in the western Harz, to secure economically the one quarter of the Rammelsberg ore profits promised to them by Frederick Barbarossa in 1129. From that it can be deduced that there was already a shortage of wood then. From the 12th to the 14th centuries, large parts of the Harz were managed economically by the Cistercian Abbey of Walkenried. As well as agriculture and fishing, they also controlled the silver mining industry in the Upper Harz and in Goslar.

In the middle of the 14th century, the settlements in the Harz became heavily depopulated as a result of the Black Death, and a systematic resettlement of mining villages in the Upper Harz did not take place until the first half of the 16th century.

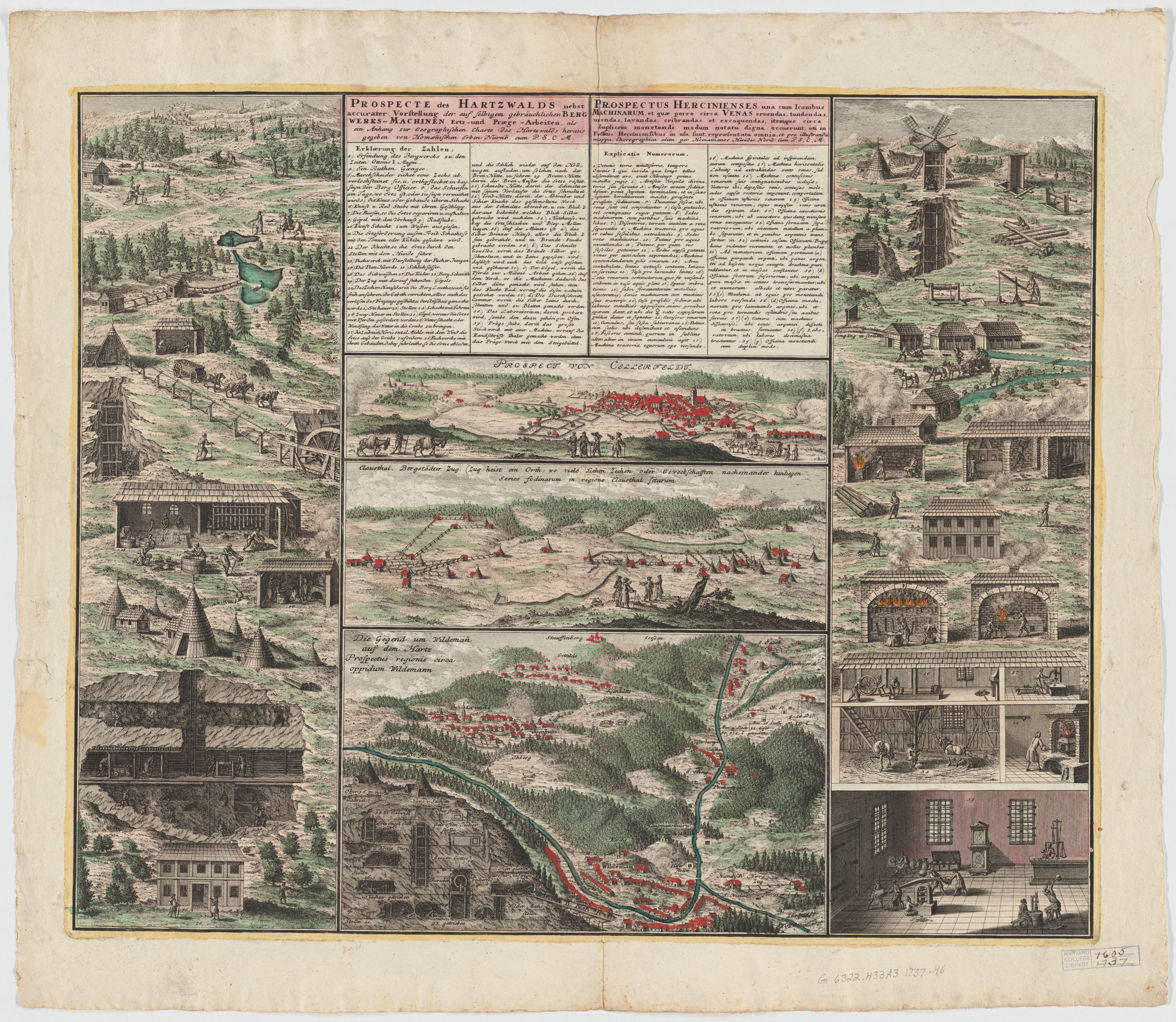
View of the Harz Forest

=== 16th century to 1933 ===
In 1588, the Nordhausen doctor, Johannes Thal, published the first book on regional flora in the world, Silva hercynia, in which he described the flowers specific to the Harz.

In 1668, Rudolph Augustus, Duke of Brunswick-Lüneburg granted the first conservation order for Baumann's Cave. The ducal decree stated, among other things, that the cave should be permanently preserved by all those responsible as a special, natural wonder. It also stated that nothing should be spoiled or destroyed, and that groups of ordinary strangers should not be allowed to enter without prior arrangement. A resident mine worker was entrusted to oversee the natural monument. Until the issue of this conservation order, there had only been an order for the protection of the forest, which had been issued by the ruling princes for real, practical considerations. But for the first time the 1668 cave order took ethical-aesthetic considerations into account. The year 1668 was the birth of classic nature conservation in the Harz. The order had been precipitated by the earlier, serious destruction of the cave's features by vandals. The first Harz 'rangers' were formed.

In 1705, the last bear was killed in the Harz, on the Brocken.

The steadily increasing consumption of wood by the pits and smelting works led to overexploitation of the forests and, from about 1700, to their outright destruction. There were no less than 30,000 charcoal piles in the Harz. In 1707, an order by Count Ernst of Stolberg forbade Brocken guides to take strangers or local folk to the Brocken without special permission, and the lighting of fires was forbidden.

The first attempts at forest conservation in the Harz were centred on the Brocken, and began with a far-sighted nature conservation act over 275 years ago. In 1718, Count Christian Ernest of the House of Stolberg issued an ordinance in which destruction or damage to the forest on the Brocken would be severely punished. In 1736, Christian Ernest also built the Wolkenhäuschen ("Little House in the Clouds") on the Brocken.

As a young man, the famous German poet, Goethe visited the Harz several times and had a number of important lifetime experiences. These included his walks on the Brocken and his visit to the mines in Rammelsberg. Later, his observations of the rocks on the Brocken led to his geological research. His first visit to the Harz awakened in him a keen interest in science (see Goethe's Wahrheit und Dichtung). In 1777, Goethe climbed the Brocken, departing from Torfhaus.

At that time, there was still no mass tourism on the Brocken; in the year 1779 only 421 walkers were recorded. Goethe described his feelings on the summit later, as follows: "So lonely, I say to myself, while looking down at this peak, will it feel to the person, who only wants to open his soul to the oldest, first, deepest feelings of truth."

On 23 March 1798, the last wolf was killed in the Harz near the Plessenburg.

The count's guest house on the Heinrichshöhe had become too small and suffered from overcrowding; in 1799 it burned down. In 1800, a new guest house was built on the Brocken to replace it.

Around 1800, large swathes of the Harz were deforested. The less resistant spruce monoculture, that arose as a consequence of the mining industry in the Upper Harz, was largely destroyed by a bark beetle outbreak and a storm of hurricane proportions in November 1800. This largest known bark beetle infestation in the Harz was known as the Große Wurmtrocknis, and destroyed about 30,000 hectares (74,000 acres; 300 km^{2}) of spruce forest and lasted about for 20 years. The woods were largely reforested with spruce. Continuous problems with bark beetle and storms were the negative side effects of mining in the Harz Mountains.

In 1818, a mounted forester, Spellerberg, from Lautenthal, killed the last lynx in the Harz on the Teufelsberg.

At the start of the 19th century, the increasing changes to the natural landscape wrought by man and the extinction of large mammals like the bear, wolf and lynx raised awareness of the threat to nature.

In 1852, the district administrator of Quedlinburg placed the Teufelsmauer, "a rock outcrop famous as an object of folklore and as a rare natural curiosity", near Thale under protection, because the inhabitants of neighbouring districts were using the rocks as a quarry. This protection order survived in spite of all protests from the local villages. Thus, a valuable natural monument was saved from destruction, and it is of note that the authorities felt that the 'romantic' reasons for its preservation were entirely justified.

Albert Peter laid out the Brocken Garden in 1890. This was the first Alpine flower garden to be established on German soil. And, in terms of its scientific concept and scope, the Brocken Garden was the first of its type worldwide.

The Brocken Railway began service in 1899, against the already strong concerns of conservationists. For example, the botanist, Bley, wanted to prevent trains from climbing the Brocken, because it he felt it would threaten the Brocken's flora.

In 1907, Hermann Löns uttered his famous cry "More Protection for the Brocken" (Mehr Schutz für den Brocken) in light of the mass tourism that was beginning to affect the Brocken. By 1912, he effectively pressed for the establishment of a Harz national park, without calling it such, in Der Harzer Heimatspark, a brochure that has remained relatively unknown. The Harz played a special role in the life of the famous regional poet, naturalist and local patriot, undoubtedly not least because his second wife, Lisa Hausmann, came from Barbis in the South Harz.

Around 1920, the capercaillie population in the Harz died out.

The Wernigerode rector, W. Voigt, wrote, in 1926, in his famous Brockenbuch:

In America it has long become the business of the people, to create a sacrosanct haven for the native flora and fauna of the regions in national parks. North and South Germany have their heath and alpine parks. May the joint efforts of the royal authorities, the local police, the Wernigerode Nature Conservation Society and individual friends of the Brocken also succeed now in central Germany, through caring nurture across the board, in establishing and preserving the Brocken too, as a small, but unique, nature reserve for the German people.

In the 1930s, national park planning in Germany became specific again. There were concrete plans for the national parks of the Lüneburg Heath, Bavarian–Bohemian Forest, High Tauern, Höllengebirge, Neusiedler See and Kurische Nehrung. The Second World War prevented these national park plans from being taken forward; nevertheless, in 1937, an Upper Harz Nature Reserve (Naturschutzgebietes Oberharz) was designated.

=== Nazi Germany and Second World War ===
During the Nazi era, the Harz area became an important production site for the armaments industry. Many factories, important to the war effort, were located there and, as the war neared its conclusion, they were increasingly staffed with slave labour. As a result, the Harz was the location of several hundred forced labour camps and concentration camps at that time. KZ Dora near Nordhausen in the South Harz became particularly infamous. This camp was a subcamp of Buchenwald concentration camp. Its prisoners were used by the SS mainly in the tunnel excavation and nearby underground stations of the Mittelwerk in Kohnstein, situated near Nordhausen, where the V-2 rocket and the flying bomb V-1 rocket were produced. The slave labourers at the Dora camp were subjected to brutal conditions, which led to more than 20,000 deaths.

In February/March 1945 the Reichsführer-SS, Heinrich Himmler, established the Harz Fortress (Harzfestung) to defend central Germany from the western allies. Its headquarters was at Blankenburg. Amongst the formations mobilised were divisions belonging to the 11th Army, divisions of the Waffen-SS and the Volkssturm. When the United States First Army reached Nordhausen in the southern Harz, and went to advance northwards, it met with resistance, especially in the hills around the towns of Ilfeld and Ellrich. Not until 7 May 1945 did the last formations of the 11th Army and Waffen SS in the Harz surrender. Several units of Volkssturm troops fought on against the Americans during May.

Shortly before his death in 2003, American Second World War veteran and organized crime figure, Frank Sheeran, admitted to having participated in a massacre of German POWs in the Harz area. At the time, Sheeran was serving in the 45th U.S. Infantry Division. According to Sheeran, his unit was climbing the Harz when they came upon a mule train carrying supplies to German positions on the hillside. The Americans handed shovels to their prisoners, forced them to dig their own graves, then shot and buried them.

Wernher von Braun, one of the leading figures in the development of rocket technology in Germany during the Second World War and, subsequently, in the United States, reportedly ordered blueprints of his work to be hidden in an abandoned mine shaft in the Harz range.

=== Former Inner German border ===
Until 1990, the Inner German border ran through the western third of the Harz. The Brocken plateau and other peaks near the border were part of a large military out-of-bounds area, which demonstrating walkers first entered on 3 December 1989. Tourism on the Brocken has since then become very intense – about 1.3 million people visit the summit of the Brocken annually. The former out-of-bounds area today has many habitats worth protecting and, as a result, it is being turned into a green belt.

== Economy ==
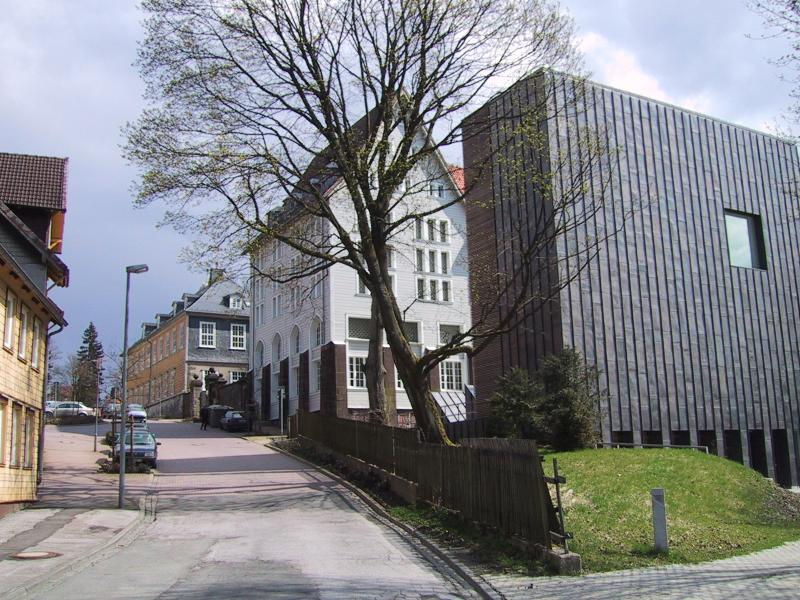
Mining archive in Clausthal-Zellerfeld

=== Historic mining industry ===
The mining industry in the Harz has its origins about 3,000 years ago during the Bronze Age. The seven Upper Harz mining towns – Clausthal, Zellerfeld, Bad Grund, Sankt Andreasberg, Lautenthal, Altenau and Wildemann – and around 30 other villages within and on the edge of the Harz can thank the Upper Harz mining and smelting industries for their boom. The former imperial town of Goslar, too, whose splendour depended on the ore treasures of the Rammelsberg, mined argentiferous lead ore for centuries. Mining heavily dominated the economic life of the Harz as well as its scenery. Miners created the famous engineering system for the management of water in the Upper Harz, the Upper Harz Water Regale, of which 70 kilometres of ditch and 68 'ponds' (with a volume of 8 million cubic metres or 280 million cubic feet) are still used today. Without using their considerable hydropower output, silver mining in the Harz would never have been able to attain its major economic significance.

In the eastern Harz Foreland (Mansfeld Land and Sangerhäuser Mulde) copper schist was mined until 1990. The early beginnings of this industry were first mentioned in 1199, and it was considered in its heyday, at the end of the 15th century, as the most important in Europe. In addition, at Ilfeld is the only stone coal mine in the Harz, the former Rabenstein Gallery Mine (Bergwerk Rabensteiner Stollen). In the North Thuringian mining area, there were numerous potash mines and, in the vicinity of Röblingen, geological waxes were extracted by a mining concern.

The last mine in the Upper Harz – the Wolkenhügel Pit in Bad Lauterberg – closed its operations in June 2007 for economic reasons. Having formerly had 1,000 workers, the mine employed just 14 people towards the end, using the most modern technology to extract barite. With the closure of this facility, mining operations that had begun in the Middle Ages and had continued unbroken since the 16th century, extracting silver, lead and zinc, came to an end. Bearing witness to the industry are cultural monuments as well as the negative consequences of mining for the environment such as pollution of the ecosystem with heavy metals.

=== Economy today ===
The booming mining industry of bygone centuries in the Harz region – especially for silver, iron, copper, lead and zinc – has declined markedly. However, the heavy metal residues in the soils of the Upper Harz, which in some cases are significant, represent a serious environmental hazard today.

Copper workings are still important today in the area of Mansfeld. The last centres of mining were the Rammelsberg near Goslar (closed 1988) and the Hilfe Gottes Pit near Bad Grund (closed 1992). In Bad Lauterberg, barite – used today primarily for the manufacture of paint and in sound insulation – was extracted until July 2007 at the Wolkenhügel Pit, the last mine in the entire Harz. Furthermore, limestone is still mined at Elbingerode in three large open pits (Werk Rübeland, Werk Kaltes Tal and Werk Hornberg). Another important employer is the Clausthal University of Technology. In addition to the classical disciplines of mining and metallurgy, many engineering and science subjects, as well as business studies courses, are taught and researched.

The extensive woods of the Harz mean that forestry plays an important economic role, as do the associated wood-working industries. In the first millennium AD, hardwood trees (mainly common beech) were predominant on the higher ground – typical of a natural highland forest. Hence one spoke of going in die Harten ("into the hardwood forest"), a term which gave the Harz its name. Today, however, the commercially managed areas are mainly monocultures of Norway spruce. A cause of this development was the mining history in the Harz region, with its high demand for wood and the consequent overuse and devastation of the stands of forest. In addition, there were the climatic changes of the so-called Little Ice Age. The reforestation with relatively easily managed and undemanding spruce trees since the middle of the 18th century was mainly due to the proposals of the Senior Forester and Master Hunter, Johann Georg von Langen.

== Tourism ==
Tourism is very important to the Harz, although the prevalence of cheap air travel has led to a decline in recent years. There are many spa towns, and almost every village in the Harz and Harz Foreland caters to tourists. Well-known destinations are the Harz National Park and the Brocken, as well as the historic towns on the edge of the Harz. Concepts like the Western town, Pullman City Harz, or the rock operas on the Brocken are intended to also be particularly attractive to foreign tourists. The Harzer Verkehrsverband (HVV) is responsible for the marketing of the Harz to tourists.

=== Winter sports ===
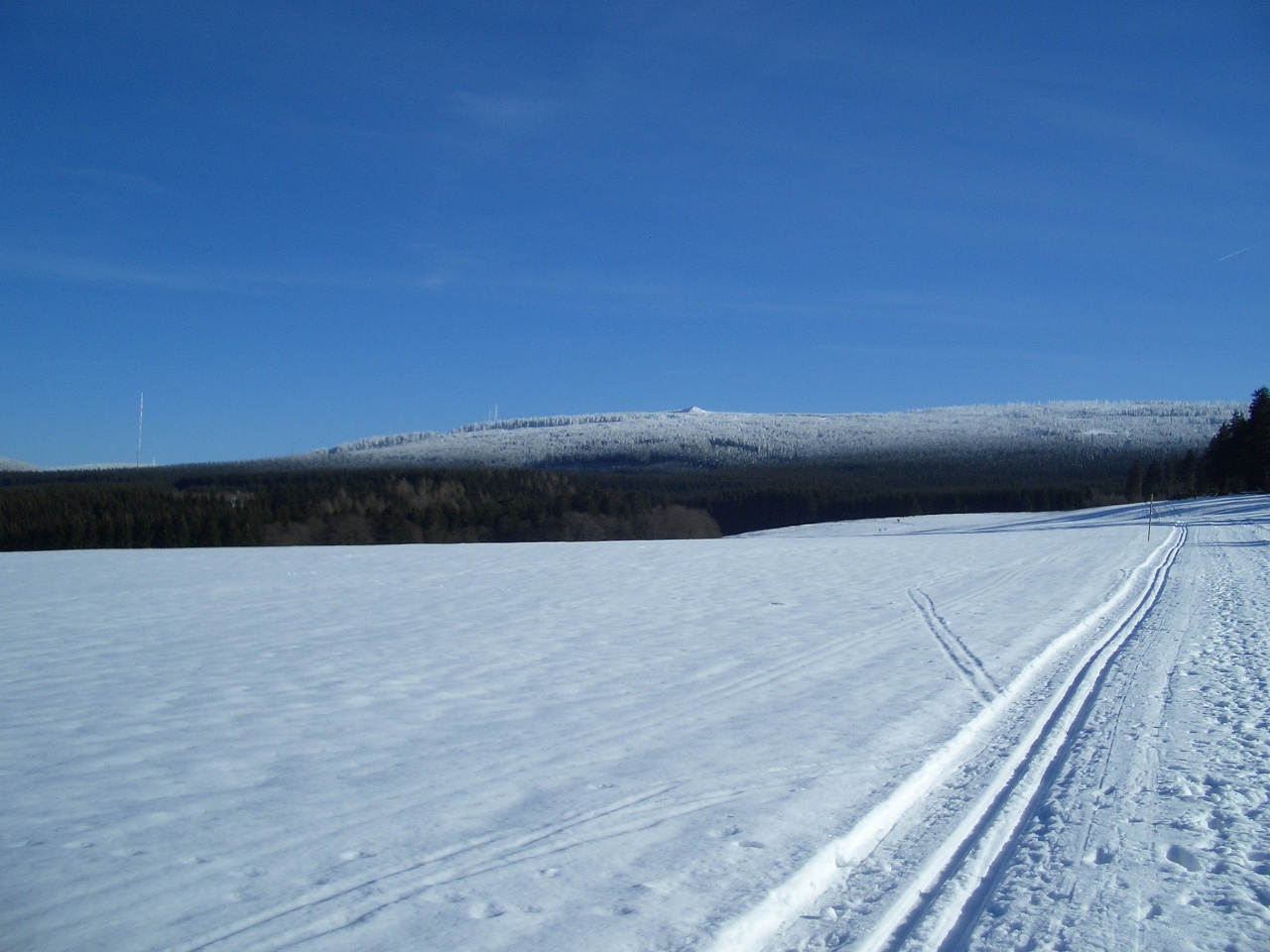
View of the Upper Harz

Although winter sport in the Harz does not have the significance of other mountain areas, such as the Thuringian Forest, Ore Mountains, Black Forest or even the Alps, there are plenty of winter sport facilities. Of particular note are the villages and towns of Altenau (including Torfhaus), Benneckenstein, Braunlage (including Hohegeiß), Goslar-Hahnenklee, Hasselfelde, Sankt Andreasberg (including Sonnenberg and Oderbrück) and Schierke. Due to the high altitude and length of their runs, Nordic skiing is very popular. International winter sport competitions take place on the Wurmberg ski jump near Braunlage and the biathlon facility at Sonnenberg.

Also worth mentioning are the many cross-country skiing runs (Loipen) in the Harz. Their quality and features are ensured by the land owners, particularly in the Harz National Park, where snow is still relatively guaranteed during the winter months, and also by individual communities and societies. The Förderverein Loipenverbund Harz, for example, is well known in this regard. It was founded in 1996 on the initiative of the Harz National Park, Harz winter sport parishes, the cable car and lift operators, hotels and transport companies, and has the aim of promoting ski tourism in the Harz and looking after the interests of nature conservation.

The mountain rescue service on the cross-country routes, the toboggan slopes, footpaths, alpine ski pistes and rough terrain is provided by the Bergwacht Harz.

=== Summer sports ===
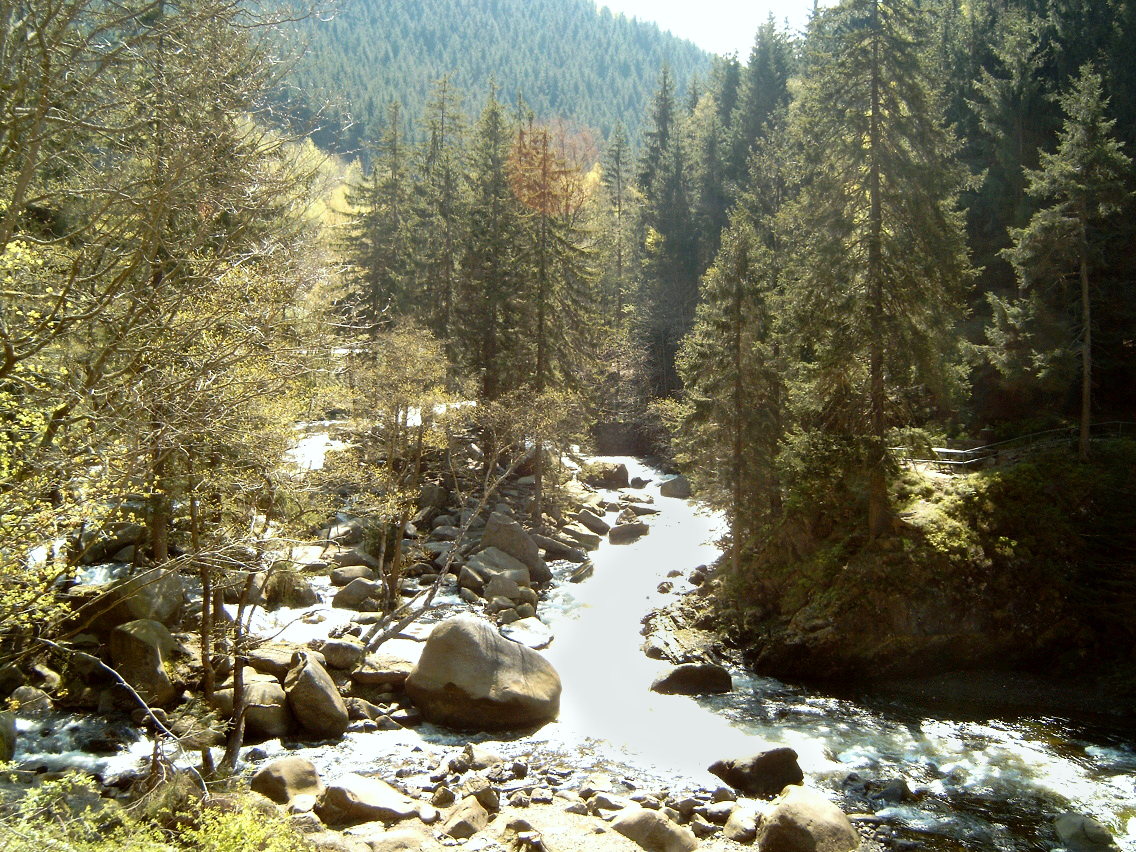
The Oker with white water. A footpath is on the right bank.

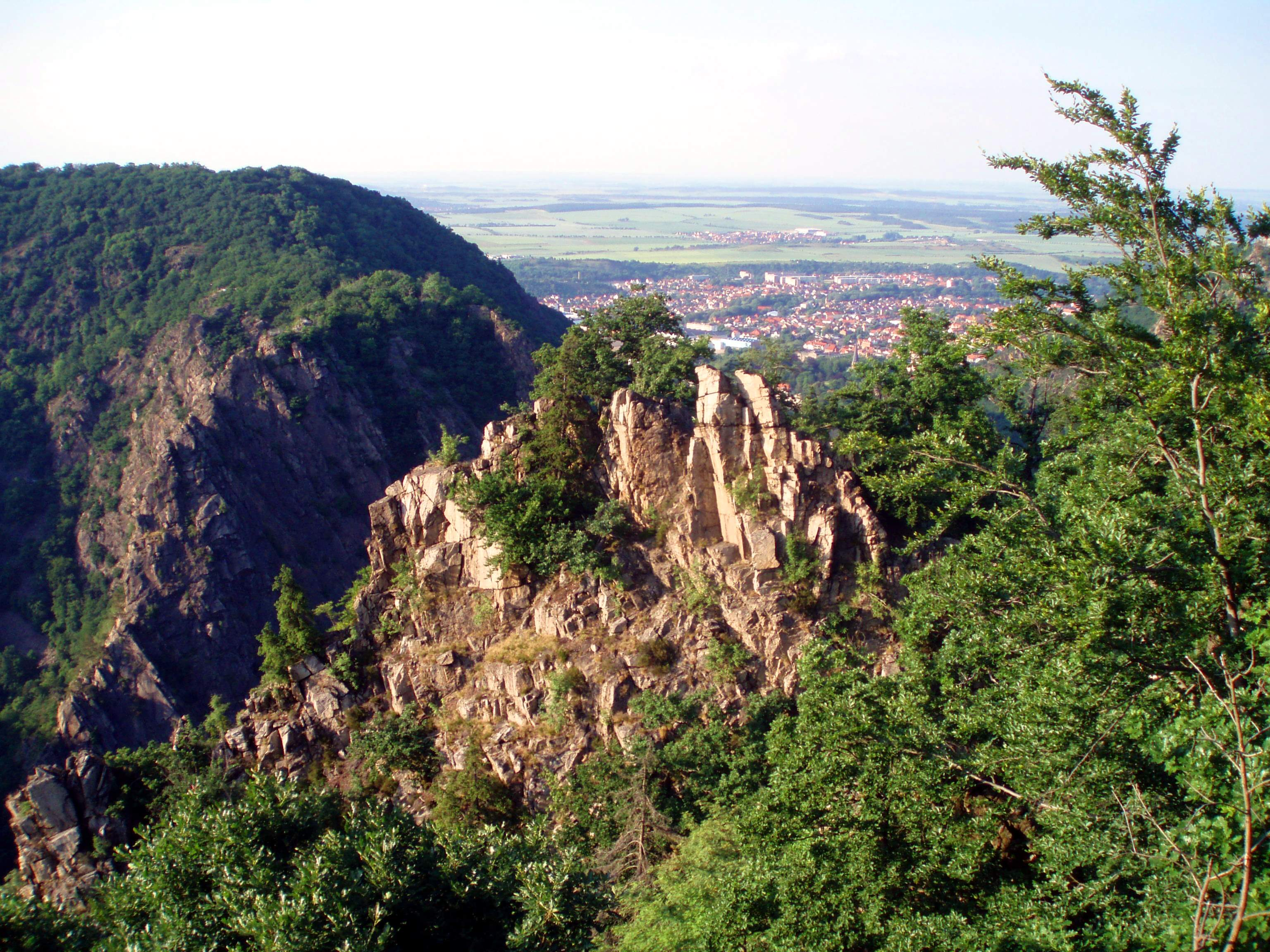
Former climbing areas on the Roßtrappe

In summer, the main activity in the Harz, by far, is walking. In recent years Nordic walking has become increasingly popular.

On several reservoirs in the Harz, a variety of water sports is permitted and, on a number of rivers originating in the Harz, there are opportunities for canoeing and other sports on white water sections. International canoe and kayak competitions take place on the Oker below the Oker Dam. The white water on this stretch of river is partly a result of the raised levels of discharge from the Oker Reservoir and so is largely independent of the weather.

Several hills provide a base for airborne activities, such as gliding and hang-gliding, notably the Rammelsberg near Goslar.

The Harz offers a range of climbing areas like, the Oker valley, with its rock outcrops (Klippen); the Adlerklippen being especially popular.

The Harz has also developed in recent years into a popular mountain bike region, with 62 signed mountain bike routes and four bike parks with lift facilities in Braunlage, Hahnenklee, Schulenberg and Thale. The bike parks offer freeride, downhill and fourcross routes. Both the signed cycle paths and the bike parks are suitable for every level of cyclist.

Roads in the Harz are used by racing bikes and touring bikes, despite their sometimes heavy use by lorries, because in the whole of North Germany there is no other region with such long, and in places very steep, descents and ascents. In addition, there are a large number of railway connections on the edge of the Harz which allow bicycles to be taken on trains.

The Harz Mountain Rescue (Bergwacht Harz) service also operates in summer, rescuing people involved in accidents on difficult terrain.

=== Walking and climbing ===
The mountains of the Harz were used in former times for long walks (e.g. by Johann Wolfgang von Goethe, Heinrich Heine and Hans Christian Andersen). An extensive network of footpaths is maintained today, especially by the Harz Club. In addition, there are several long-distance paths (the Harz Witches' Trail, Kaiser Way, Karst Trail and Selke Valley Trail), as well as a trans-regional project, the Harzer Wandernadel, with 222 checkpoints and a range of walking badges that may be earned for various levels of achievement.

The Harz is also home to Germany's first naturist hiking trail, the Harzer Naturistenstieg.

In the Oker Valley and at Roßtrappe near Thale, there are rocks on the Hohneklippen (the Höllenklippe or the Feuerstein near Schierke, among several) that are used by climbers.

=== Running ===
The Harz Run (German: Harzquerung) is a fun run and walking event in the Harz mountains of Germany organised by the Wernigerode Skiing Club (Skiklub Wernigerode 1911) which takes place on the last Saturday of April. The main run is an ultra marathon which is 51 kilometres (32 mi) long and crosses the Harz between Wernigerode and Nordhausen in a north–south direction. There is also a 25 km route from Wernigerode to Benneckenstein and a 28 km course from Benneckenstein to Nordhausen.

== Dialects of the Harz ==
The main dialects of the Harz region are Eastphalian and Thuringian.

== Notable sites ==
=== Mines and caves ===
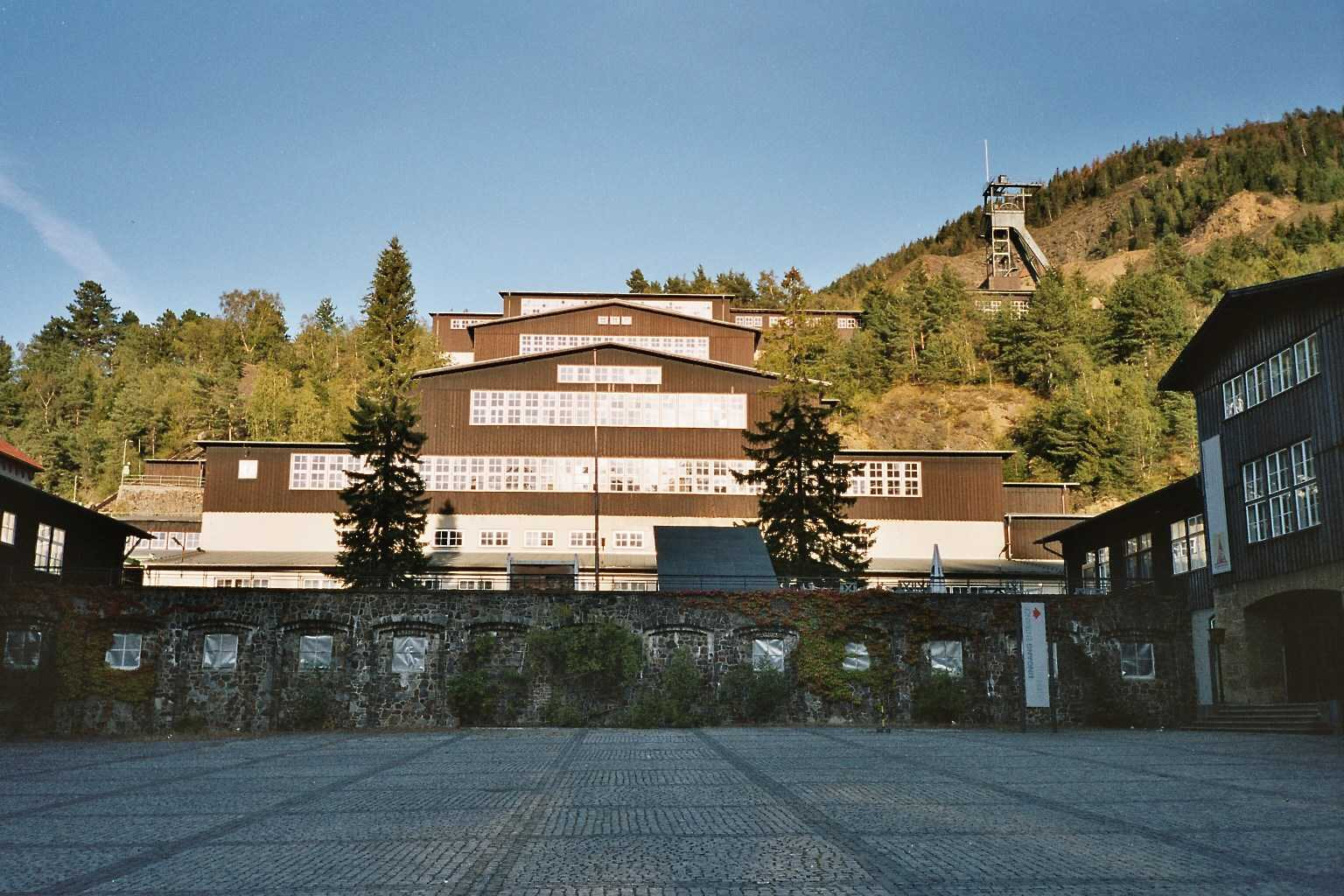
Rammelsberg Mining Museum

Geomorphological processes have led to the formation of caves in the gypsum, dolomite and limestone layers of the Harz. These dripstone caves include Baumann's Cave, the Unicorn Cave, Hermann's Cave, the Iberg Dripstone Cave and, on the southern edge of the Harz, the Heimkehle. Because the older formations contained many mineral deposits, they were explored very early on by the mining industry. The mines have often been turned into show mines. For example, the Samson Pit was for a long time the deepest mine in the world. Other show mines are the Büchenberg, Drei Kronen & Ehrt, the Röhrigschacht show mine, the Lange Wand show mine in Ilfeld and the Rabensteiner Stollen show mine in Netzkater. Others have been turned into mining museums, like the Upper Harz Mining Museum in Clausthal-Zellerfeld, the Lautenthal Mining Museum with its pit railway, or the Rammelsberg Mining Museum near Goslar, which is a UNESCO World Heritage Site. The Roter Bär Pit in St. Andreasberg also served as a training mine until the 20th century and is today, preserved true to the original, as a visitor mine.

=== Towns and villages ===
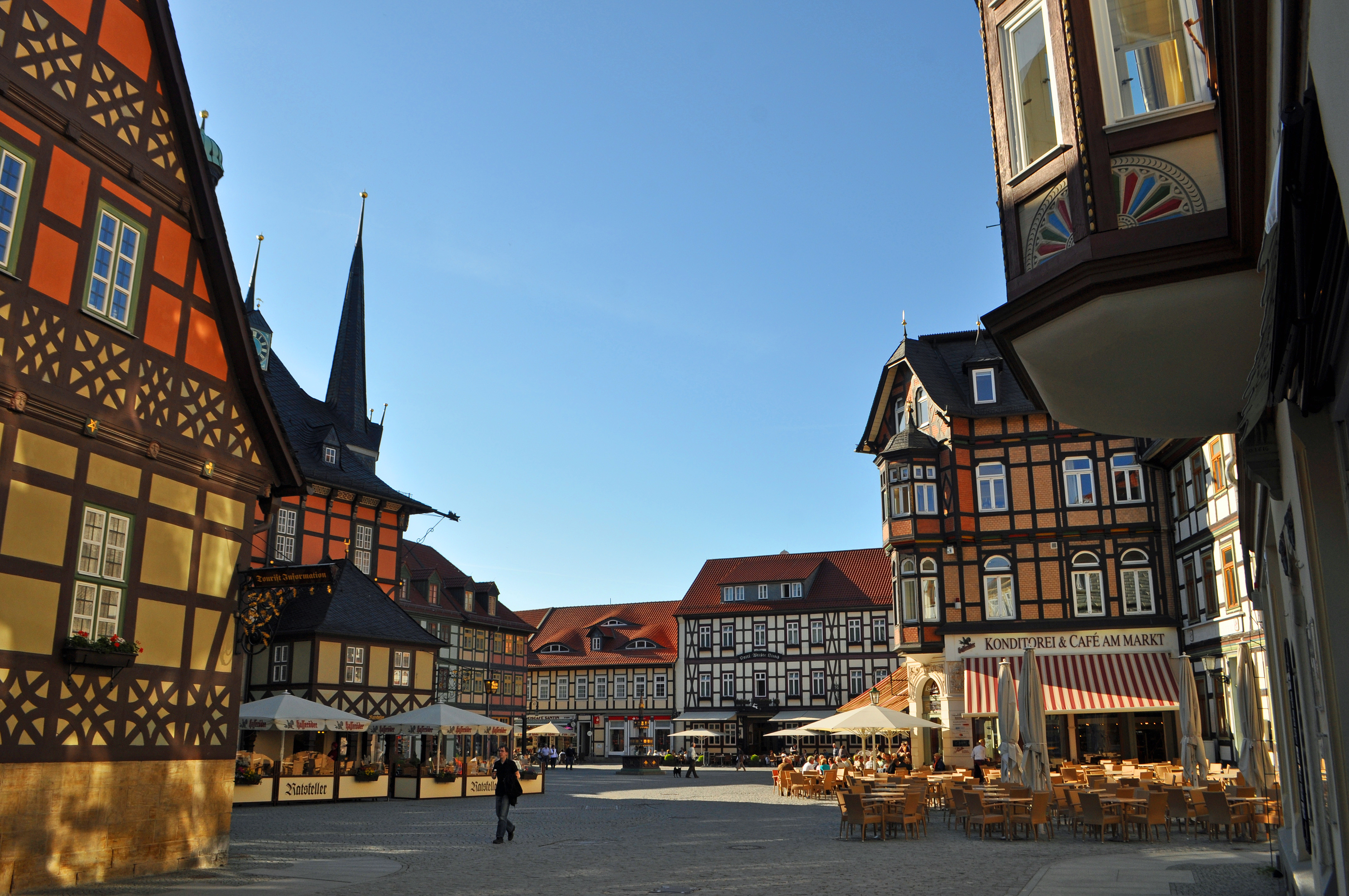
Old town of Wernigerode

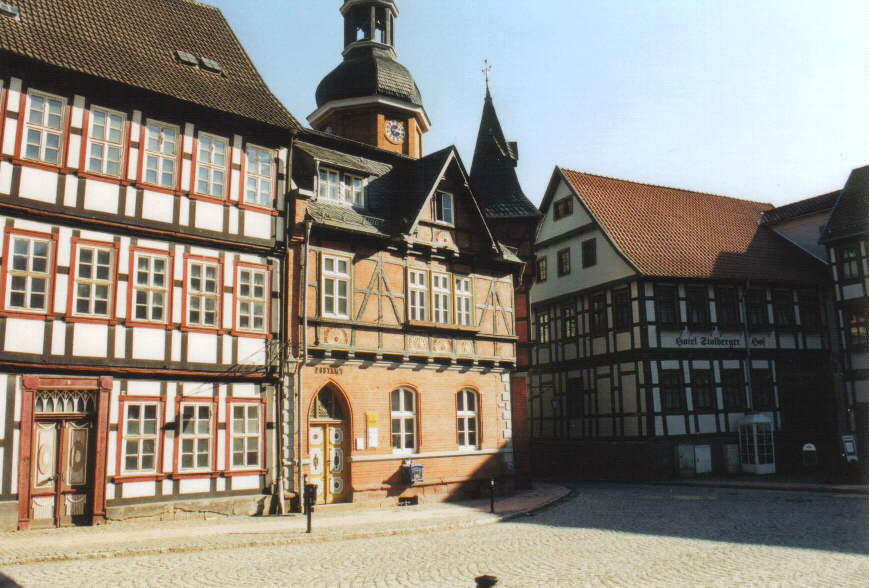
Stolberg

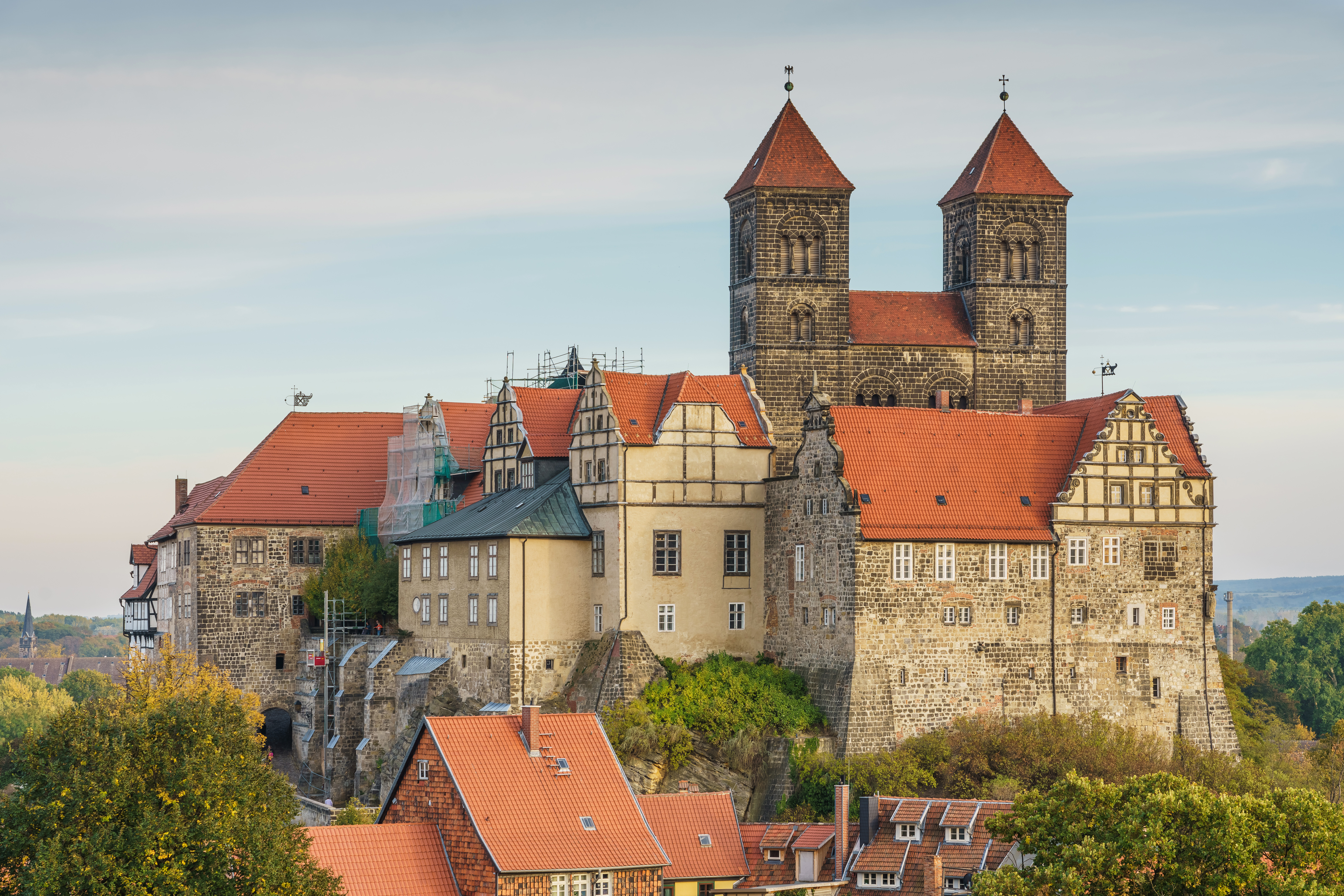
Castle and abbey of Quedlinburg

The following towns and villages are found in or around the Harz region:

- Allrode
- Altenau
- Bad Grund
- Bad Harzburg
- Bad Lauterberg im Harz
- Bad Sachsa
- Bad Suderode
- Ballenstedt
- Blankenburg
- Braunlage
- Breitenstein
- Breitungen
- Clausthal-Zellerfeld
- Dietersdorf
- Ellrich
- Falkenstein/Harz
- Gernrode
- Gittelde
- Goslar
- Hainrode
- Harzgerode
- Hattorf am Harz
- Hayn
- Herrmannsacker
- Herzberg am Harz
- Ilfeld
- Ilsenburg
- Kleinleinungen
- Langelsheim
- Mansfeld
- Neustadt/Harz
- Niedersachswerfen
- Nordharz
- Nordhausen
- Oberharz am Brocken
- Osterode am Harz
- Questenberg
- Rieder
- Roßla
- Sangerhausen
- Sankt Andreasberg
- Schwenda
- Seesen
- Stolberg
- Thale
- Uftrungen
- Wieda
- Wildemann
- Walkenried
- Wernigerode
- Westerhausen
- Wienrode
- Wippra
- Zorge

=== Towns in the Harz Foreland ===
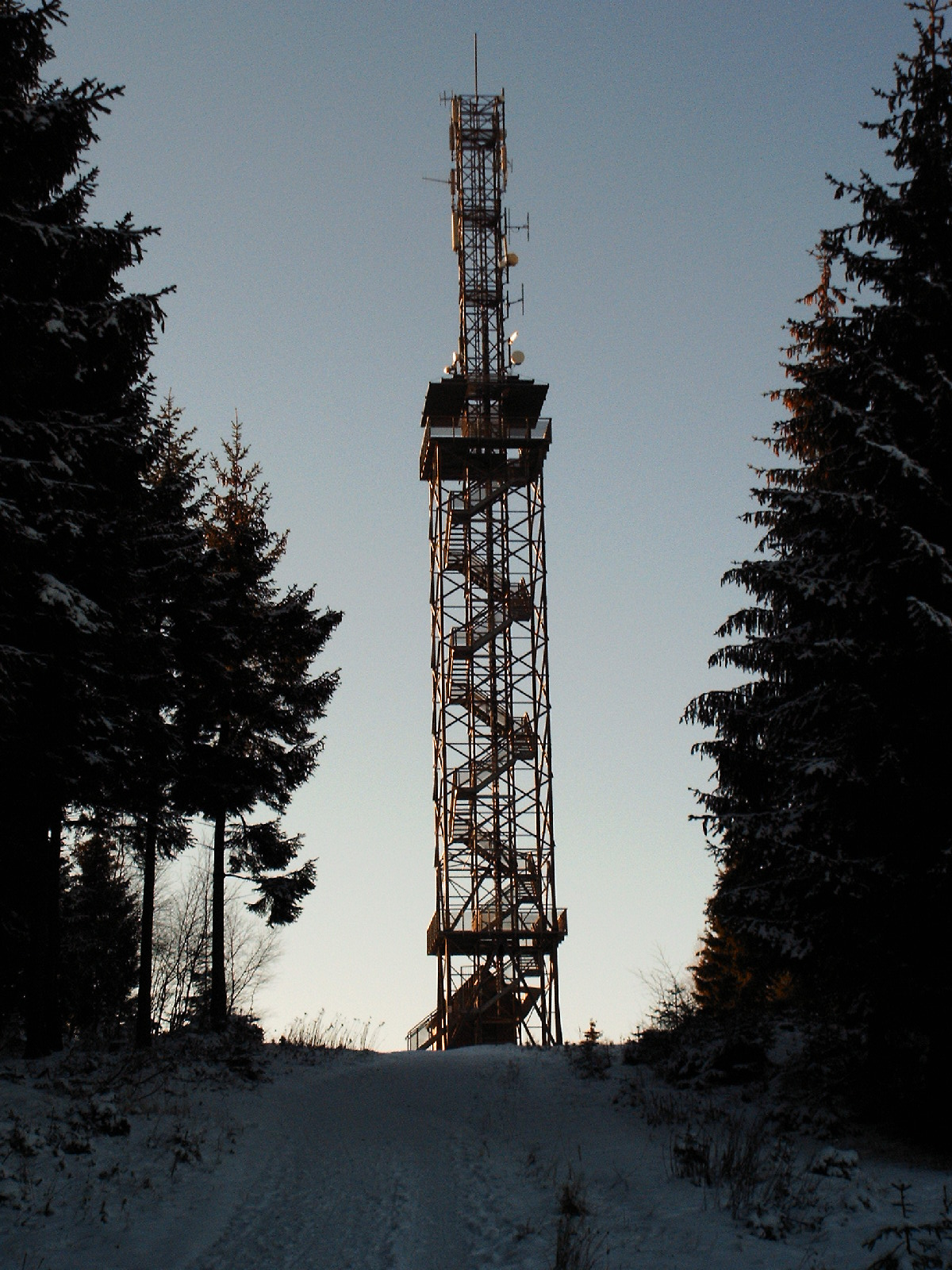
Carlshaus Tower on the Carlshaushöhe (626 m above NN)

- Lower Saxony: Alfeld, Bad Gandersheim, Bad Salzdetfurth, Bockenem, Duderstadt, Einbeck, Göttingen, Hildesheim, Northeim, Salzgitter, Vienenburg and Wolfenbüttel.
- Saxony-Anhalt: Aschersleben, Derenburg, Eisleben, Halberstadt, Hettstedt, Oschersleben, Osterwieck, Quedlinburg, Sangerhausen and Staßfurt.
- Thuringia: Bleicherode, Heringen/Helme, Nordhausen and Sondershausen.

=== Abbeys and churches ===
The medieval abbeys of Drübeck, Ilsenburg, Michaelstein, Quedlinburg and Walkenried are found mainly on the edge of the Harz. In Hahnenklee there is a wooden stave church, the Gustav Adolf Stave Church which was consecrated in 1908.

=== Towers, palaces and castles ===
The high elevation of many places in the Harz has been used to advantage to erect transmission or observation towers. These include the Carlshaushöhe near Trautenstein, the observation tower on the Großer Knollen or the Josephskreuz. In historical times, high ridges and spurs were used as sites for fortified castles (Burgen). In the Harz these include Falkenstein Castle, where Eike von Repkow probably drew up the Sachsenspiegel, the most important legal code of the German Middle Ages, Hohnstein Castle near Neustadt/Harz, Lauenburg Castle near Stecklenberg, Plessenburg and Stecklenburg, as well as the ruined castles of Harzburg, Anhalt, Königsburg, Scharzfels. In addition to these defensive structures, palatial castles (Schlösser) were also built, such as Herzberg Castle, Blankenburg Castle, Stolberg Castle and Wernigerode Castle.

=== Other attractions ===
Little Harz is a miniature park in Wernigerode with 60 detailed replicas of selected buildings and attractions of the Harz region on a scale of 1:25.

== Transport ==
=== Rail ===
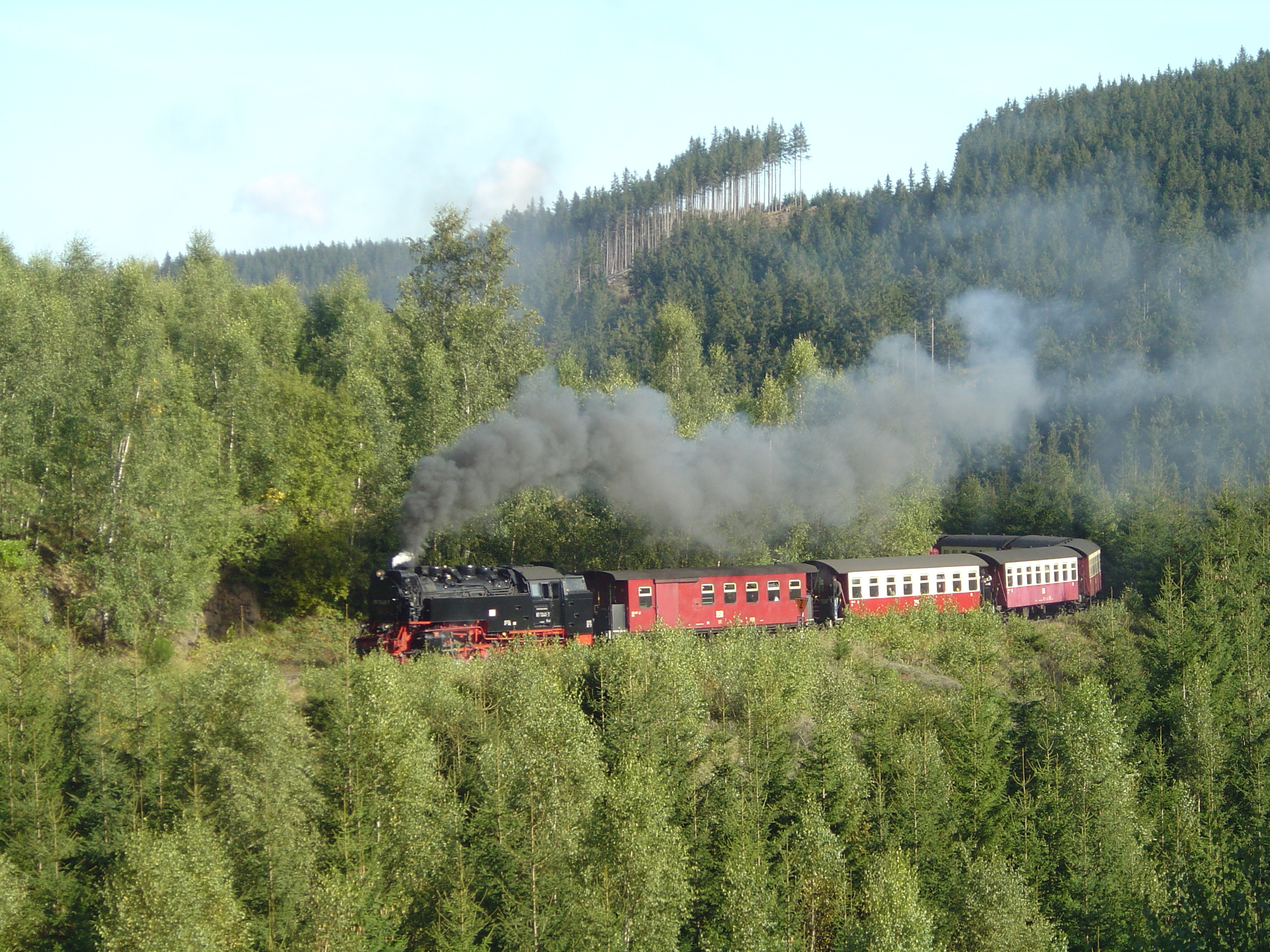
Narrow gauge railway

The Harzer Schmalspurbahnen (Harz Narrow Gauge Railways), colloquially known as the Harzquerbahn (Trans-Harz Railway), a narrow (metre)-gauge steam and diesel-powered railway network is a very popular mode of transport, especially with tourists. The railways link Wernigerode, Nordhausen, Quedlinburg and the Brocken. Prior to the closure of the Inner German border the present-day network was joined at Sorge to the Südharzbahn (South Harz Railway), which ran from Walkenried to Braunlage and Tanne.

Main line railways serve the major towns around the Harz including Halberstadt, Wernigerode, Thale, Quedlinburg and Nordhausen. The Harz used to be served by a number of branch lines, some of which are still open. Those operating regular passenger services are the Halberstadt–Blankenburg, Quedlinburg–Thale, Klostermansfeld–Wippra and Berga-Kelbra–Stolberg lines. All the branch lines in Lower Saxony (the Innerste Valley Railway and Oder Valley Railway) have been closed. The Rübeland Railway is only used by goods traffic at present, but there are plans to run it as a heritage railway.

Around the Harz a number of railway lines form a ring. They are, clockwise from the north, the Heudeber–Danstedt–Vienenburg, the Halberstadt–Vienenburg railway, the Halle–Halberstadt railway, the Berlin-Blankenheim Railway, the Halle-Kassel Railway, the South Harz Line, the Herzberg–Seesen railway, the Goslar–Seesen railway and the Vienenburg–Goslar railway.

=== Road ===
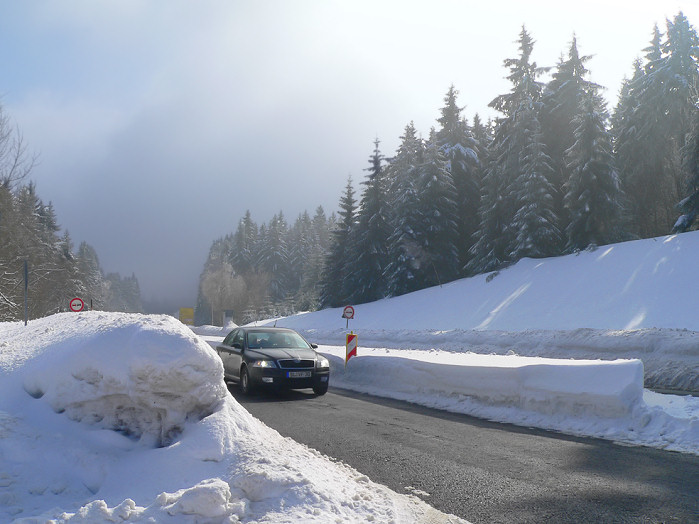
The B 4/B 242 Harz high road near Braunlage

The Harz is grazed by the A 7 motorway in the west and the A 38 in the south. A four-lane motor road, the B 243 runs along the southwestern perimeter of the Harz via Osterode to Bad Lauterberg. In addition there is a good federal road (the B 6, B 4) from Goslar to Braunlage. The North Harz Foreland benefits from the newly built B 6n. Both the B 4 and the B 6n have been upgraded almost to motorway standard. The B 4 crosses the Harz from Bad Harzburg on a north–south axis running through Torfhaus and Braunlage as far as Ilfeld on the edge of the South Harz. The rest of the Harz is also well served by federal roads. Important ones include the Harz high road (Harzhochstraße, the B 242), which crosses the Harz in an east–west direction (from Seesen to Mansfeld) and the B 241, which runs from Goslar in the north over the Upper Harz (Clausthal-Zellerfeld) as far as Osterode in the south.

== See also ==
- Category:Hiking trails in Germany
