= Carlshaushöhe =

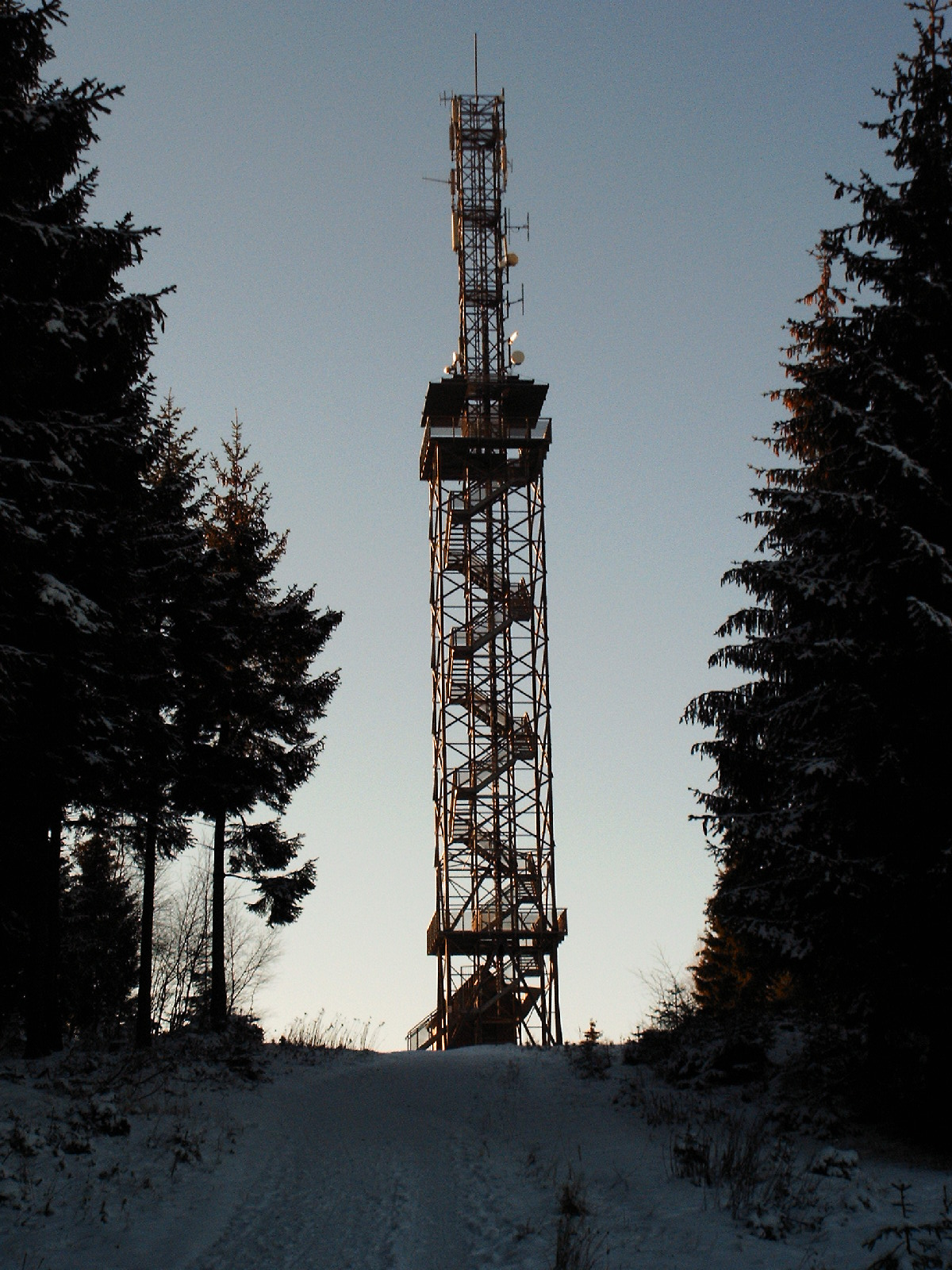
- The new Carlshaus Tower (1901–1981 Bismarck tower since 1998 telecommunication and observation tower)

Highest point
- Elevation: 626.3 m (2,055 ft)
- Coordinates: 51°39′24″N 10°47′49″E

Geography
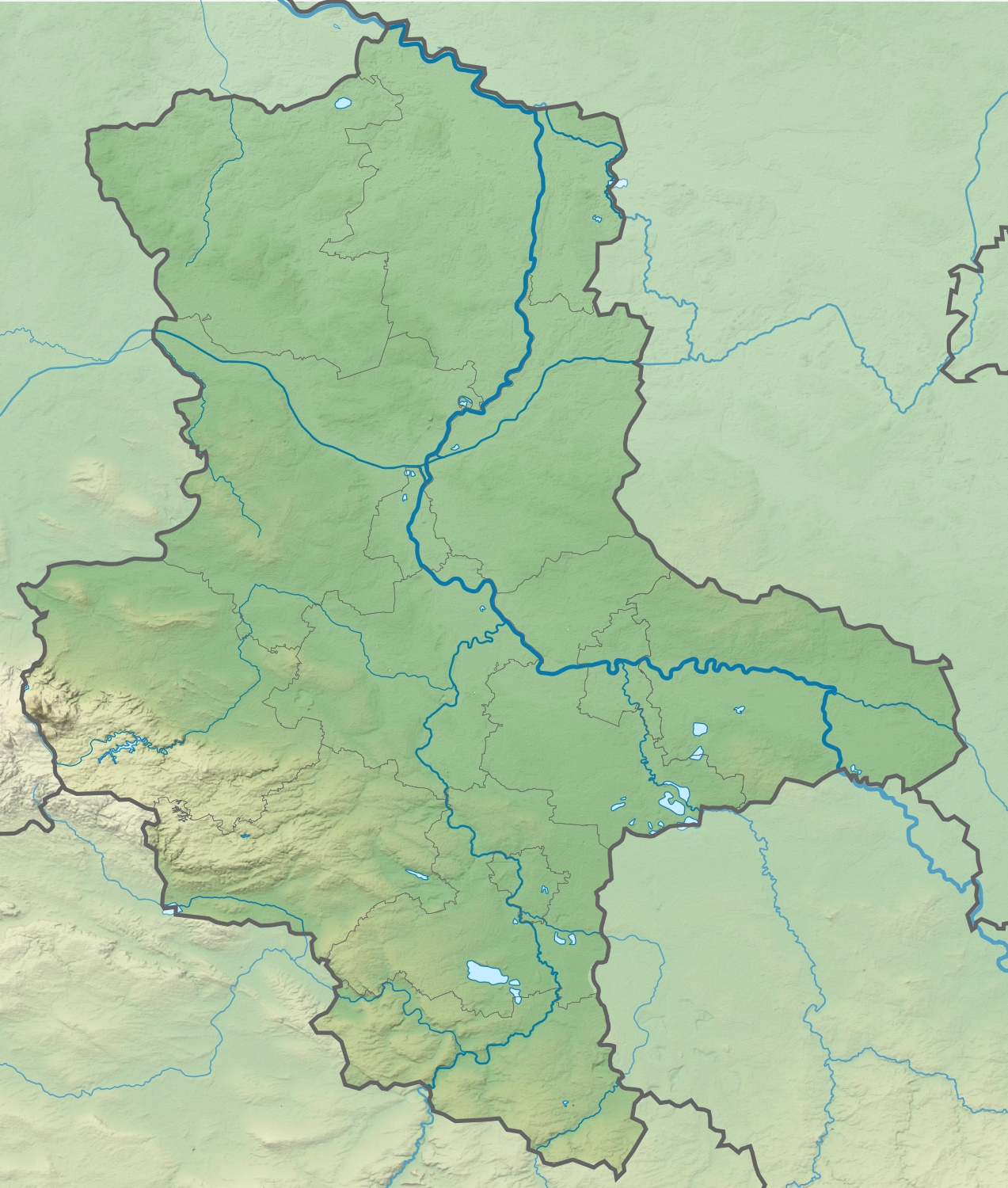
- Location within Saxony-Anhalt
- Location: Saxony-Anhalt, Germany
- Parent range: Harz Mountains

Geology
- Mountain type: Grauwacke

The Carlshaushöhe (or Karlshaushöhe) is a mountain, 626.3 m, in the Harz in the German state of Saxony-Anhalt.

== Geographical location ==
It is located southwest of Hasselfelde between Trautenstein to the north, Benneckenstein to the west and Sophienhof in the borough of Ilfeld in Thuringia to the south.

== Carlshaus Tower ==
On the summit of the Carlshaushöhe, which rises to the west of the B 81 federal highway, stands the 50 m high Carlshaus Tower (Carlshausturm), or Karlshaus Tower, which was built a few hundred metres west of the Carlshaus on the eastern slope of the mountain. It has an open steel design and its opening was celebrated on 27 July 1998.

The Carlshaus Tower acts as a radio tower for the Harz Narrow Gauge Railways (HSB), two branches of which pass by the tower a few kilometres to the south and east respectively, as well as an observation tower. It replaced the Bismarck Tower built in 1901 and demolished by the Soviet Armed Forces in 1981., The Bismarck Tower was also of open steel construction, was about 20 m high and crowned by a circular observation deck.

From its observation platform, that sits above the tops of the trees at a height of about 30 metres and is accessible via a staircase with 155 steps, there is an all-round view, for example, over the highlands of the Harz. The highest peak in the Harz, the Brocken, is visible from here as well as the Kyffhäuser.

The Carlshaus Tower has been included in a project by the Harz Transport Federation and the Harz Club. It is also no. 51 in the system of check points in the Harzer Wandernadel network of walking trails.

== Transport links ==
The Carlshaushöhe and the Carlshaus Tower are located between the B 242 (north), B 81 (east) and B 4 (south) federal highways, so that it can be reached by walking trails leading from the car parks on these roads or their side-roads.
