= Hilmersberg =

Coordinates: 51.6735°N 9.560°E

The Hilmersberg is a hill, 362 metres above sea level in the Solling, a hill range in the German state of Lower Saxony. It lies west of Kammerborn and east of Polier, part of the borough of Bodenfelde in the Solling-Vogler Nature Park.
