= Trautenstein =

- Ortsteil of Oberharz am Brocken
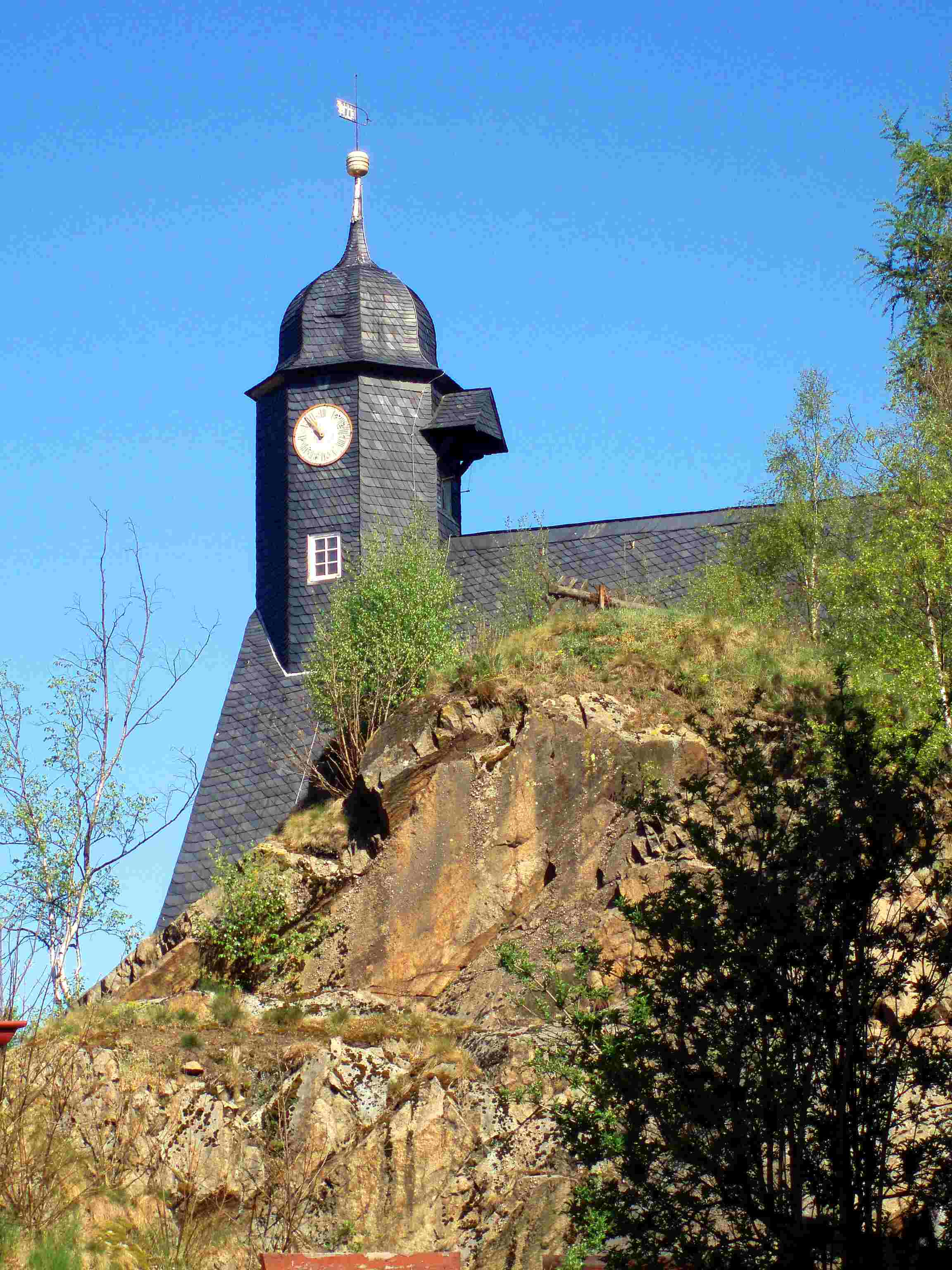
- View of Trautenstein church

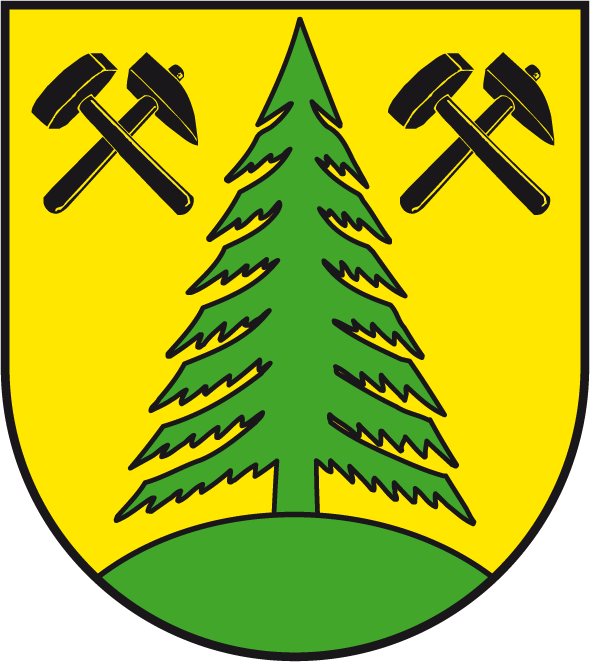
- Coat of arms
- Interactive map of Trautenstein
- Location within Germany Location within Saxony-Anhalt
- Coordinates: 51°41′07″N 10°47′10″E
- Country: Germany
- State: Saxony-Anhalt
- District: Harz
- Town: Oberharz am Brocken

Area
  - Total: 1.928 km^{2} (0.744 sq mi)
- Elevation: 460 m (1,510 ft)

Population (2021-12-31)
  - Total: 390
  - Density: 200/km^{2} (520/sq mi)
- Time zone: UTC+01:00 (CET)
  - Summer (DST): UTC+02:00 (CEST)
- Postal codes: 38899
- Dialling codes: 039459

Trautenstein (German pronunciation: [ˈtʁaʊtn̩ʃtaɪn]) is a village in the borough of Oberharz am Brocken in the district of Harz in the German state of Saxony-Anhalt. Formerly an independent municipality, it was merged into the town of Hasselfelde in 2002, which was merged into Oberharz am Brocken in 2010. Its population is 390 (2021).

== Geography ==
The small climatic health resort lies in the valley of the Rappbode at the southwestern end of the Rappbode Reservoir. South of the village is the Bärenhöhe ("Bear Heights"), also known as the Carlshaushöhe, which is 626 metres high. The popular Carlshaus Tower, a telecommunication and observation tower of the Harz Narrow Gauge Railway, is on the summit.

Larger towns and villages in the vicinity include Braunlage, Bad Lauterberg, Bad Harzburg (in Lower Saxony) and Blankenburg, Wernigerode and Hasselfelde (in Saxony-Anhalt). The most important link road is the B 242 from Hasselfelde to Braunlage, which passes through Trautenstein.

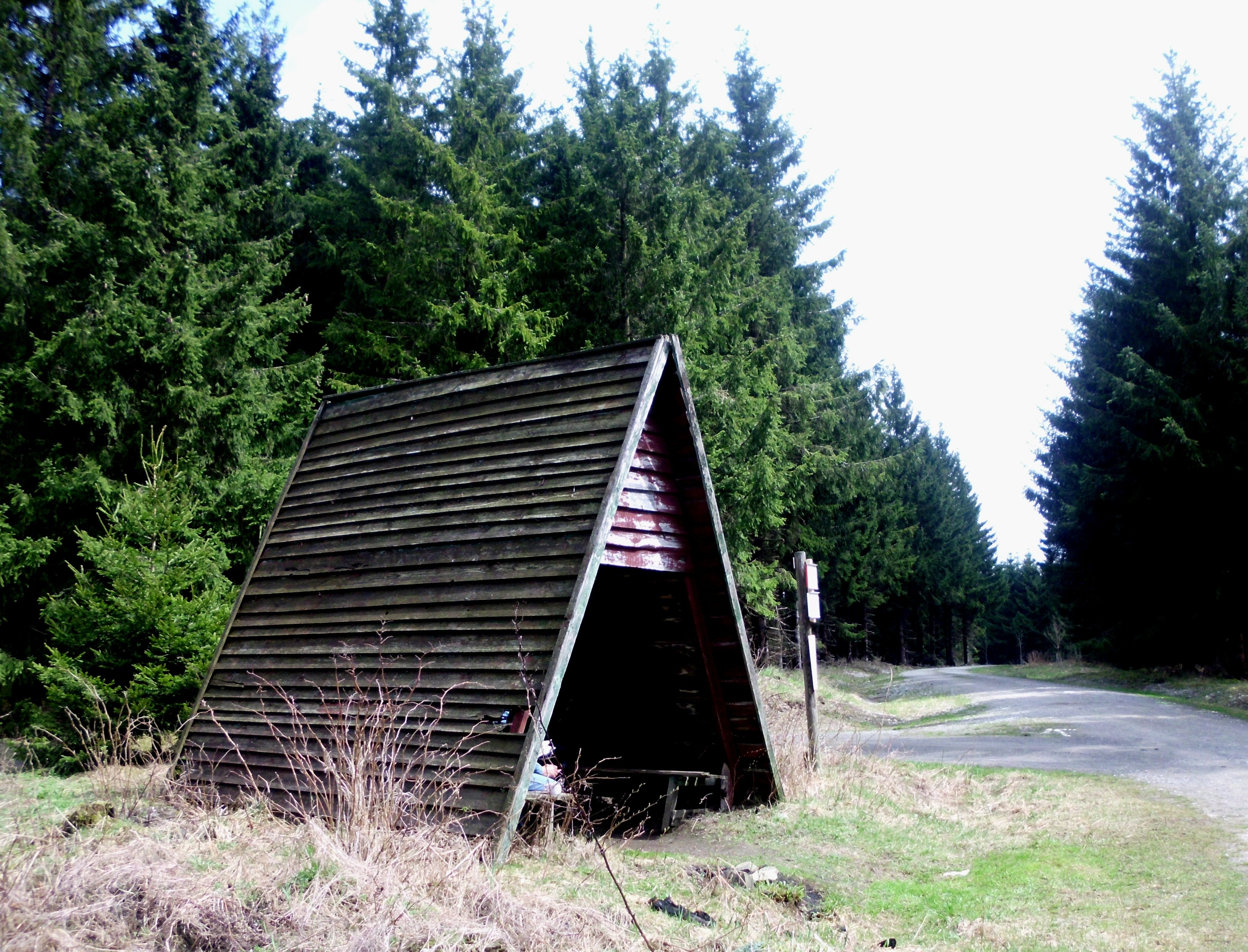
The Walzenhütte

South of Trautenstein in the forest is a refuge hut, the Walzenhütte (521 m), which is checkpoint 50 in the Harzer Wandernadel hiking network. Another nearby checkpoint is the Oberharzblick am Buchenberg (Upper Harz view on the Buchenberg hill), which is further south and has a good view of Harz's two highest mountains: Wurmberg and Brocken.

== Personalities ==
- Albert Schneider (1838–1910), surveyor and railway director
- Karl Gronau (1889-1950), high school teacher
