= List of shipwrecks in 1771 =

The list of shipwrecks in 1771 includes some ships sunk, wrecked or otherwise lost during 1771.

table of contents
1771
Jan	Feb	Mar	Apr
May	Jun	Jul	Aug
Sep	Oct	Nov	Dec
Unknown date

== January ==
=== 5 January ===
List of shipwrecks: 5 January 1771
Ship	State	Description
Binney	Great Britain	The ship was wrecked on the Haisborough Sands, in the North Sea off the coast of Norfolk. Her crew were rescued. She was on a voyage from Dunbar, Lothian and Hull, Yorkshire to London.

=== 12 January ===
List of shipwrecks: 12 January 1771
Ship	State	Description
Merchant	Great Britain	The ship was driven ashore and wrecked at Deal, Kent. Her crew were rescued. She was on a voyage from Seville, Spain, to London.

=== 18 January ===
List of shipwrecks: 18 January 1771
Ship	State	Description
Catharine	Great Britain	The ship departed from Georgia, British America for London. No further trace, presumed foundered in the Atlantic Ocean with the loss of all hands.

=== 19 January ===
List of shipwrecks: 19 January 1771
Ship	State	Description
Polly	Great Britain	The ship departed from Newfoundland on this date. No further trace, presumed foundered with the loss of all hands.

=== 26 January ===
List of shipwrecks: 26 January 1771
Ship	State	Description
Peggy	Great Britain	The ship was driven ashore and foundered on the Flemish coast. Her crew were rescued by a Dutch fishing vessel. She was on a voyage from Berwick upon Tweed to Bordeaux, France.

=== 27 January ===
List of shipwrecks: 27 January 1771
Ship	State	Description
Cleveland	Great Britain	The ship was driven ashore and wrecked at Appledore, Devon. She was on a voyage from Alicante, Spain, to a port in the north of England.
Hazard	Great Britain	The ship was destroyed by fire in the River Thames.
John & Elizabeth	Great Britain	The ship was lost on this date. Her crew were rescued.

=== 28 January ===
List of shipwrecks: 28 January 1771
Ship	State	Description
Jamaica Paquet	Great Britain	The ship foundered in the Atlantic Ocean with the loss of three of her crew. She was on a voyage from the Leeward Islands to Milford, Pembrokeshire and Cork, Ireland.

=== 29 January ===
List of shipwrecks: 29 January 1771
Ship	State	Description
William	Great Britain	The ship was driven ashore and wrecked near Molaine, French coast. She was on a voyage from Porto, Portugal, to London.

=== 31 January ===
List of shipwrecks: 31 January 1771
Ship	State	Description
Two Sisters	Great Britain	The ship was driven ashore at Penzance, Cornwall. She was on a voyage from Seville, Spain, to Ostend, Dutch Republic.

=== Unknown date ===
List of shipwrecks: Unknown date 1771
Ship	State	Description
Anna	Dutch Republic	The ship foundered in the Atlantic Ocean off Faro, Portugal.
Annabella	Great Britain	The ship sank in the Saint Lawrence River.
Charlotte	Ireland	The ship was driven ashore on the South of the Piles, County Dublin with the loss of two of her crew. She was on a voyage from Rotterdam, Dutch Republic, to Dublin.
Charming Polly	Great Britain	The ship was lost at Jersey, Channel Islands. She was on a voyage from Jersey to London.
Devonshire	Great Britain	The ship was driven ashore in the River Thames at London Bridge. She was on a voyage from Málaga, Spain, to London.
Friendship	Great Britain	The ship was lost near Danzig.
Galicia Packet	Great Britain	The ship was driven ashore and wrecked in St Ives Bay. Her crew were rescued. She was on a voyage from Bristol, Gloucestershire, to London.
Jane	Ireland	The sloop was lost near A Coruña, Spain. She was on a voyage from Málaga to Dublin.
John & Lydia	Great Britain	The ship foundered in the North Sea. She was on a voyage from Rotterdam to London.
Liberty	Great Britain	The ship was wrecked on the Spaniard Sand, in the Thames Estuary. She was on a voyage from Alicante, Spain, to London.
Liberty	Great Britain	The ship was driven ashore and wrecked at Christchurch, Hampshire. She was on a voyage from London to Virginia, British America.
L'Onconomie	France	The ship was driven ashore at Dunkirk. She was on a voyage from Málaga, Spain, to Dunkirk.
Mercury	Great Britain	The ship was wrecked on the Dutch coast. She was on a voyage from Gallipoli, Ottoman Empire, to Amsterdam, Dutch Republic.
Prince of Wales	Ireland	The ship foundered in the Atlantic Ocean. She was on a voyage from Alicante, Spain, to Cork.
Providence	Great Britain	The ship was driven ashore on the South of the Piles. She was on a voyage from London to Dublin.
Rebekah	Great Britain	The ship was sunk by ice in the River Thames.
St. Joseph	Great Britain	The ship was driven ashore in Tor Bay. She was on a voyage from London to Exeter, Devon and Bilbao, Spain.
St. Peter	Great Britain	The ship foundered in Tor Bay. She was on a voyage from London to Exeter.
Vermandois	France	The ship was driven ashore and wrecked at Dunkirk. She was on a voyage from Dunkirk to Martinique.

== February ==
=== 18 February ===
List of shipwrecks: 18 February 1771
Ship	State	Description
Maria Juliana	Sweden	The ship ran aground at Clogherhead, County Louth, Ireland and was wrecked. She was on a voyage from Gothenburg to Dundalk, County Louth.

=== 21 February ===
List of shipwrecks: 21 February 1771
Ship	State	Description
Jacob and Sarah	Great Britain	The ship sank in the Black River, Africa. Her crew were rescued.

=== 24 February ===
List of shipwrecks: 24 February 1771
Ship	State	Description
Nelly	Great Britain	The ship was wrecked in the Bay of Luce. She was on a voyage from Lisbon, Portugal, to Dumfries.

=== Unknown date ===
List of shipwrecks: Unknown date 1771
Ship	State	Description
Abraham	Dutch Republic	The ship was driven ashore at Ostend. She was on a voyage from Cádiz, Spain, to Ostend.
Dee Gree	Portugal	The ship was wrecked on the coast of Sicily. She was on a voyage from Sicily to Lisbon.
Dolphin	Great Britain	The ship was lost at Figueira da Foz, Portugal. She was on a voyage from Newfoundland, British America to Lisbon, Portugal.
Imtrepide	France	The ship was lost at Cette. She was on a voyage from Honfleur to Cette.
Joseph & Betsey	Great Britain	The tender foundered in the Atlantic Ocean off the Isles of Scilly.
Seville Trader	Great Britain	The ship was lost on the coast of Sicily.
Speedwell	Great Britain	The ship sank at Liverpool, Lancashire.
St. Vallery	France	The ship was lost between Quilleboeuf and Villequier. She was on a voyage from Marseille to Rouen.
Thames	Great Britain	The ship foundered in the North Sea off Harwich, Essex. She was on a voyage from Borrowstounness, Lothian, to London.
Thomas & Jane	Great Britain	The ship was driven ashore and wrecked on the Dutch coast. She was on a voyage from Gallipoli, Ottoman Empire, to Amsterdam.
William & Mary	Great Britain	The ship was driven ashore and wrecked at New Romney, Kent. She was on a voyage from London to King's Lynn, Norfolk.
Wilkes	Great Britain	The ship departed from Virginia, British America for London in early February. No further trace, presumed foundered with the loss of all hands.

== March ==
=== 5 March ===
List of shipwrecks: 5 March 1771
Ship	State	Description
Petworth	Great Britain	The ship struck rocks and was wrecked off St Martin's, Isles of Scilly. She was on a voyage from Arundel, Sussex, to Liverpool, Lancashire.

=== 6 March ===
List of shipwrecks: 6 March 1771
Ship	State	Description
Prussian Hero	Great Britain	The ship foundered in the Atlantic Ocean (48°50′N 9°09′W). She was on a voyage from London to Tobago.

=== 14 March ===
List of shipwrecks: 14 March 1771
Ship	State	Description
St Bridget	France	The ship was lost near Brest. Her crew were rescued. She was on a voyage from Limerick, Ireland, to Bordeaux.

=== 21 March ===
List of shipwrecks: 21 March 1771
Ship	State	Description
George & Margaret	Great Britain	The ship was driven ashore at Calais, France. She was on a voyage from Sunderland, County Durham to London.

=== 27 March ===
List of shipwrecks: 27 March 1771
Ship	State	Description
Polly	Great Britain	The ship was driven ashore and wrecked on Princess Island, Africa. She was on a voyage from London to Africa.

=== Unknown date ===
List of shipwrecks: Unknown date 1771
Ship	State	Description
Ann	Great Britain	The ship was wrecked on the Portuguese coast. She was on a voyage from Toulon, France, to Amsterdam, Dutch Republic.
Betsey	Ireland	The ship was driven ashore near Duncannon, County Wexford. She was on a voyage from St. Ubes, Portugal to Waterford. She was later refloated and taken in to Passage Pier.
Commerce	Great Britain	The ship was driven ashore near Wexford. She was on a voyage from London to Dublin.
Dorothy-Elizabeth	Dutch Republic	The ship was driven ashore at Margate, Kent, Great Britain. She was on a voyage from Rotterdam to Bordeaux, France.
Expedition	Great Britain	The ship was driven ashore near Appledore, Devon.
Good Intent	Great Britain	The ship struck a rock and sank at Salcombe, Devon. She was on a voyage from Plymouth, Devon, to London. Good Intent was later refloated.
Hereford	Great Britain	The ship was driven ashore near Pool, Dorset. She was on a voyage from Bristol, Gloucestershire, to London. She was later refloated.
Patty	Great Britain	The ship was driven ashore near Dunkirk, France. She was on a voyage from London to Dunkirk.
Prince Frederick	Great Britain	The ship foundered in The Swin. Her crew were rescued. She was on a voyage from Newcastle upon Tyne, Northumberland, to London.
Sally & Polly	Great Britain	The ship foundered. Her crew were rescued by Amelia ( (Kingdom of Great Britain) Guernsey). Sally & Polly was on a voyage from "Saloe" to Cowes, Isle of Wight.
Submission	Great Britain	The ship foundered in The Swin. Her crew were rescued. She was on a voyage from Newcastle upon Tyne to London.

== April ==
=== 8 April ===
List of shipwrecks: 8 April 1771
Ship	State	Description
Granby	(Kingdom of Great Britain) British America	The sloop foundered in the Atlantic Ocean off Boston, Massachusetts. She was on a voyage from Halifax, Nova Scotia, to Boston. According to another report, the ship hit rocks near Halifax during a storm. It brought 3000 pounds sterling and some goods to the Royal Naval Dockyard of Halifax (?). On board were two marine guards, a pilot and twelve crewmen, alongside the ship's captain, all of whom died. Seven bodies were buried.

=== 15 April ===
List of shipwrecks: 15 April 1771
Ship	State	Description
Kesgrove	Great Britain	The ship was driven ashore at Whitby, Yorkshire.
Peggy	Great Britain	The ship capsized in the Atlantic Ocean (41°20′N 45°00′W) with the loss of nine of the nineteen people on board. Survivors were rescued by Philadelphia Packet ( (Kingdom of Great Britain) British America). Peggy was on a voyage from Jamaica to Liverpool, Lancashire.

=== 25 April ===
List of shipwrecks: 25 April 1771
Ship	State	Description
Verelst	British East India Company	The East Indiaman was lost off Mauritius. Thirty of her crew were rescued.

=== 28 April ===
List of shipwrecks: 28 April 1771
Ship	State	Description
Palliser	Ireland	The ship departed from Waterford for Newfoundland, British America. No further trace, presumed foundered in the Atlantic Ocean with the loss of all on board.

=== Unknown date ===
List of shipwrecks: Unknown date 1771
Ship	State	Description
Colonel Walpole	Great Britain	The ship foundered in the Atlantic Ocean off Peniche, Portugal. Her crew were rescued. She was on a voyage from Milford, Pembrokeshire, to Lisbon, Portugal.
Hope	Great Britain	The ship was lost at "Christiana", Ireland. She was on a voyage from Saint Kitts to London.
Neptune	Great Britain	The ship was lost near Calais, France with the loss of all hands. She was on a voyage from Sunderland, County Durham to Porto, Portugal.
Palliser	Ireland	The ship departed from Waterford for Newfoundland, British America. No further trace, presumed foundered in the Atlantic Ocean with the loss of all hands.
Priscilla	Great Britain	The ship was lost near Whitby, Yorkshire with the loss of all but one of her crew. She was on a voyage from London to Newcastle upon Tyne, Northumberland.

== May ==
=== 15 May ===
List of shipwrecks: 15 May 1771
Ship	State	Description
Beaver	(Kingdom of Great Britain) British America	The schooner was wrecked 10 leagues (30 nautical miles (56 km)) south of Sandusky, Ohio with the loss of all fifteen people on board.

=== 17 May ===
List of shipwrecks: 17 May 1771
Ship	State	Description
Pensilvania Paquet	(Kingdom of Great Britain) British America	The ship was driven ashore and wrecked at Dunkirk, France. She was on a voyage from Philadelphia, Pennsylvania, to Dunkirk.

=== 25 May ===
List of shipwrecks: 25 May 1771
Ship	State	Description
Elizabeth	Great Britain	The ship foundered in the Atlantic Ocean off Cape Cornwall with the loss of five of her eight crew.

=== 29 May ===
List of shipwrecks: 29 May 1771
Ship	State	Description
Pervy (Первый, 'The First')	Imperial Russian Navy	The bomb vessel foundered with the loss of 32 of her 38 crew. She was on a voyage from Taganrog to the ru:Petrovskaya Fortress on the Sea of Azov.

=== Unknown date ===
List of shipwrecks: Unknown date in May 1771
Ship	State	Description
Hope	Sweden	The ship was driven ashore near Holme-next-the-Sea, Norfolk, Great Britain. She was on a voyage from Stockholm to King's Lynn, Norfolk. Hope was later refloated and taken in to King's Lynn.

== June ==
=== 6 June ===
List of shipwrecks: 6 June 1771
Ship	State	Description
Jane	Great Britain	The ship was driven ashore and severely damaged in the Elbe. She was on a voyage from Cette, France, to Hamburg.

=== 9 June ===
List of shipwrecks: 9 June 1771
Ship	State	Description
Generous Planter	Great Britain	The ship struck a rock in the Cattewater and capsized. She was on a voyage from London to Saint Kitts.

=== 17 June ===
List of shipwrecks: 17 June 1771
Ship	State	Description
Prince Edward	Great Britain	The ship was driven ashore and wrecked at Saltfleet, Lincolnshire.
Three Brothers	Dutch Republic	The ship foundered in the English Channel 12 leagues (36 nautical miles (67 km)) off Beachy Head, Sussex, Great Britain. Her crew were rescued by Morant Bay (Great Britain). Three Brothers was on a voyage from Saint-Malo, France, to Amsterdam.

=== 21 June ===
List of shipwrecks: 21 June 1771
Ship	State	Description
Carolina	Sweden	The ship was driven ashore and wrecked at Dunkirk, France. Her crew were rescued. She was on a voyage from Norrköping to the Strait of Gibraltar.

=== Unknown date ===
List of shipwrecks: Unknown date 1771
Ship	State	Description
Emanuel	Hamburg	The ship was driven ashore and wrecked on Rømø. Denmark. She was on a voyage from Nantes, France, to Hamburg.
Flora	France	The ship sank in the Loire. She was on a voyage from Léogâne, Hispaniola, to Nantes.
George	Great Britain	The ship foundered off Liverpool, Lancashire. She was on a voyage from Africa to Liverpool.
Lark	Great Britain	The ship was wrecked on the Barbary Coast. Her crew were rescued. She was on a voyage from Liverpool to Africa.
St. Julian	Great Britain	The East Indiaman was wrecked on the Isle of Corises, Africa.
Young Isaac	Great Britain	The ship was driven ashore and wrecked near Saint-Valery-sur-Somme, France, with the loss of two of her crew. She was on a voyage from Gallipoli, Ottoman Empire, to Hamburg.

== July ==
=== 1 July ===
List of shipwrecks: 1 July 1771
Ship	State	Description
Favourite Betsey	Great Britain	The ship foundered in the Atlantic Ocean (37°N 61°W). Her crew were rescued by Generous Friends (Great Britain). Favourite Betsey was on a voyage from Barbados to Georgia, British America.

=== 2 July ===
List of shipwrecks: 2 July 1771
Ship	State	Description
Defiance	Great Britain	The ship foundered whilst on a voyage from Falmouth, Cornwall, to Swansea, Glamorgan.

=== 11 July ===
List of shipwrecks: 11 July 1771
Ship	State	Description
40 unnamed vessels	Imperial Russian Navy	A fire at the Saint Petersburg ru:Galley Port destroyed 25 galleys, a brigantine, 3 dubel boats, 3 half-galleys, 4 10-oar boats and 4 other vessels.

=== 31 July ===
List of shipwrecks: 31 July 1771
Ship	State	Description
Ann	Ireland	The ship was lost at Killala, County Mayo. She was on a voyage from Dublin to Galway.

=== Unknown date ===
List of shipwrecks: Unknown date 1771
Ship	State	Description
Eleanor	Ireland	The ship foundered in the Atlantic Ocean 350 leagues (1,050 nautical miles (1,940 km) west of Ireland. She was on a voyage from Dublin to New England, British America.

== August ==
=== 21 August ===
List of shipwrecks: 21 August 1771
Ship	State	Description
Catharine	Dutch Republic	The dogger was wrecked on the Goodwin Sands, Kent, Great Britain with the loss of all but three of her crew. She was on a voyage from Bordeaux, France, to Gothenburg, Sweden.

=== 24 August ===
List of shipwrecks: 24 August 1771
Ship	State	Description
Prince Frederick	Great Britain	The packet boat sank off Ostend, Dutch Republic. All on board were rescued.

=== 25 August ===
List of shipwrecks: 25 August 1771
Ship	State	Description
Urienden	Dutch Republic	The ship was wrecked on the Goodwin Sands, Kent, Great Britain. Her crew were rescued. She was on a voyage from Amsterdam to Bayonne, France.

=== 26 August ===
List of shipwrecks: 26 August 1771
Ship	State	Description
Elizabeth	Great Britain	The ship departed from Maryland, British America for Bristol, Gloucestershire. No further trace, presumed foundered with the loss of all hands.

=== Unknown date ===
List of shipwrecks: Unknown date 1771
Ship	State	Description
Eagle	Great Britain	The ship foundered in the Atlantic Ocean off Land's End, Cornwall. She was on a voyage from Pool, Dorset to Chester, Cheshire.
Edingburg Paquet	Great Britain	The ship foundered in the North Sea off Orfordness, Suffolk. She was on a voyage from Hull, Yorkshire, to London.
Friends Desire	Great Britain	The ship was driven ashore and wrecked on the Swedish coast. She was on a voyage from London to Riga, Russia.
Hope	Great Britain	The ship was driven ashore and wrecked at Wolverton, Norfolk.
Mary	Great Britain	The ship was driven ashore in the Elbe. She was on a voyage from Lisbon, Portugal, to Hamburg.
Phenix	Great Britain	The ship foundered in the North Sea. She was on a voyage from Saint Petersburg, Russia, to Liverpool, Lancashire.
Thomas	Great Britain	The ship was lost on the Nyad. She was on a voyage from Königsburg, Prussia, to London.
Truelove	Great Britain	The ship was driven ashore and wrecked between Hellevoetsluis and Rotterdam, Dutch Republic with the loss of all on board. She was on a voyage from Marseille, France, to Rotterdam.
Venus	Great Britain	The ship was driven ashore near Faro, Portugal. She was on a voyage from Cádiz, Spain, to Exeter, Devon.
Virgin	Great Britain	The ship was driven ashore near Wexford, Ireland. She was on a voyage from Portsmouth, Hampshire, to Liverpool, Lancashire.

== September ==
=== 15 September ===
List of shipwrecks: 15 September 1771
Ship	State	Description
Francis	Great Britain	The ship was destroyed by fire in the Atlantic Ocean off Cape St. Mary's, Portugal. She was on a voyage from Cádiz, Spain, to Bristol, Gloucestershire.

=== 24 September ===
List of shipwrecks: 24 September 1771
Ship	State	Description
Apollo	Great Britain	The ship was driven ashore at Travemünde, Lübeck She was on a voyage from Travemünde to London.

=== Unknown date ===
List of shipwrecks: Unknown date 1771
Ship	State	Description
Constantia	(Denmark) Norway	The ship foundered in the North Sea off Great Yarmouth, Norfolk, Great Britain. She was on a voyage from Saint Croix to Christiansand.
Elizabeth	(Kingdom of Great Britain) Guernsey	The ship was wrecked on the Dutch coast. She was on a voyage from Gothenburg, Sweden, to Guernsey.
Friendship	Great Britain	The ship capsized at Chatham, Kent.
Hambro Merchant	Great Britain	The ship was driven ashore at the mouth of the River Colne, Essex. She was on a voyage from Hamburg to London.
Hannah Johanna	Hamburg	The ship was driven ashore and wrecked on the Dutch coast with some loss of life. She was on a voyage from Waterford, Ireland, to Hamburg.
Nancy	Great Britain	The ship was driven ashore and wrecked on Hogland, Russia. She was on a voyage from Hull, Yorkshire, to Saint Petersburg, Russia.
Juno	Great Britain	The ship was driven ashore in the River Thames 14 nautical miles (26 km) downstream of Gravesend, Kent. She was on a voyage from Antigua to London.
Trial	Great Britain	The ship foundered in the Atlantic Ocean off Fogo, Newfoundland, British America.

== October ==
=== 7 October ===
List of shipwrecks: 7 October 1771
Ship	State	Description
Bacchus		The ship was wrecked on the Goodwin Sands, Kent, Great Britain. She was on a voyage from St. Remo, Republic of Genoa to Hamburg.
Edward	Great Britain	The ship was driven ashore and wrecked on the south coast of the Isle of Wight. Her crew were rescued. She was on a voyage from Caernarfon to London.
Friendship	Great Britain	The ship was driven ashore and wrecked at Kingsdown, Kent. Her crew were rescued.
Mary	Ireland	The ship was run into by another vessel in The Downs and was consequently beached in Pegwell Bay, Kent. She was on a voyage from Cork to London.

=== 8 October ===
List of shipwrecks: 8 October 1771
Ship	State	Description
Anna Elizabeth Dorothea	Sweden	The ship was lost near the Dungeness Lighthouse, Kent, Great Britain with the loss of all but one of her crew. She was on a voyage from Bordeaux, France, to Christianstadt.

=== 9 October ===
List of shipwrecks: 9 October 1771
Ship	State	Description
Vrouw Maria	Dutch Republic	The brig foundered off Nagu, Sweden having run aground on 3 October. Her crew survived. She was on a voyage from Amsterdam, North Holland, to Saint Petersburg, Russia.

=== 12 October ===
List of shipwrecks: 12 October 1771
Ship	State	Description
Osterley	Great Britain	The ship ran aground and was wrecked off The Needles, Isle of Wight.

=== 13 October ===
List of shipwrecks: 13 October 1771
Ship	State	Description
Jason	Sweden	The ship was driven ashore and wrecked at Dymchurch, Kent, Great Britain. Her crew were rescued. She was on a voyage from St. Ubes, Portugal to Norrköping.
Polly	Great Britain	The ship was driven ashore and wrecked 3 nautical miles (5.6 km) from Bridport, Dorset with the loss of most of her crew. She was on a voyage from Virginia, British America, to London.

=== 14 October ===
List of shipwrecks: 14 October 1771
Ship	State	Description
Bethia	Great Britain	The ship was driven ashore and wrecked at Margate, Kent. She was on a voyage from Saint Vincent to London.

=== 15 October ===
List of shipwrecks: 15 October 1771
Ship	State	Description
Pomona	Great Britain	The ship capsized in the Atlantic Ocean (48°58′N 10°28′W). Her crew were rescued by HMS Salisbury ( (Kingdom of Great Britain) Royal Navy).

=== 18 October ===
List of shipwrecks: 18 October 1771
Ship	State	Description
Feodor (Феодор)	Imperial Russian Navy	The frigate foundered off Agios Efstratios in the Aegean Sea. Her crew were rescued. She was on a voyage from Thasos to Imbros.

=== 22 October ===
List of shipwrecks: 22 October 1771
Ship	State	Description
Andrew	Great Britain	The ship was wrecked on The Triangles. She was on a voyage from British Honduras to Philadelphia, Pennsylvania, British America.

=== 24 October ===
List of shipwrecks: 24 October 1771
Ship	State	Description
Carolina	Great Britain	The ship departed from the Grenades for London. No further trace, presumed foundered in the Atlantic Ocean with the loss of all hands.

=== 26 October ===
List of shipwrecks: 26 October 1771
Ship	State	Description
James and Mary	Ireland	The ship foundered in the Atlantic Ocean 40 leagues (120 nautical miles (220 km)) off Cape Finisterre, Spain. Her crew took to the boat and were rescued three days later by a French vessel. She was on a voyage from Málaga, Spain, to Cork.

=== 28 October ===
List of shipwrecks: 28 October 1771
Ship	State	Description
Yunge-Tobias (Юнге-Тобиас, 'Junge Tobias')	Imperial Russian Navy	The galiot was driven ashore and wrecked on Hogland with the loss of all but two of the 46 people on board. She was on a voyage from Kronstadt to Reval.

=== Unknown date ===
List of shipwrecks: Unknown date 1771
Ship	State	Description
Catharine	Great Britain	The ship foundered in the North Sea off Harwich, Essex. She was on a voyage from Wisbech, Cambridgeshire, to London.
Cato	Great Britain	The ship was driven ashore at Biddiford, Devon. She was on a voyage from Casco Bay, British America, to Biddiford.
Coalition	Great Britain	The ship was driven ashore near Margate, Kent. She was on a voyage from London to Liverpool, Lancashire.
Conolly	Ireland	The ship was wrecked on the Welsh coast. She was on a voyage from Dublin to Philadelphia, Pennsylvania, British America.
Dauphin	France	The ship was lost during October.
Deliana Maria	Prussia	The ship was lost about 3 leagues (9 nautical miles (17 km)) from Porto, Portugal. She was on a voyage from Memel to Porto.
Diana	Great Britain	The ship foundered in the Bristol Channel off Barnstaple, Devon with the loss of all hands. She was on a voyage from Goldsborough, North Carolina, British America to London.
Douglass	Great Britain	The ship ran aground off the Isles of Scilly.
Earl of Shannon	Ireland	The ship was lost near Milford, Pembrokeshire, Great Britain. She was on a voyage from Lisbon, Portugal, to Cork.
Elizabeth	Great Britain	The ship was lost near Cherbourg, France. Her crew were rescued by La Madamosele (France). Elizabeth was on a voyage from Virginia, British America, to London.
George	Great Britain	The Guineaman was driven ashore near Workington, Cumberland.
Glory	Great Britain	The ship driven ashore at Milford. She was on a voyage from Dominica to Liverpool.
Henrietta	Great Britain	The ship foundered in the English Channel off Guernsey, Channel Islands. She was on a voyage from Lisbon, Portugal, to London.
Henry	Great Britain	The ship was driven ashore at "Pilla Fowdry". She was on a voyage from Virginia, British America, to Liverpool.
Hibernia	Ireland	The ship was lost near Wexford. She was on a voyage from Riga, Russia, to Dublin.
Integrity	Great Britain	The ship was run into by another vessel in The Downs and was consequently beached. She was later taken in to Ramsgate, Kent for repairs.
Latham	Great Britain	The ship was wrecked in the Swin. She was on a voyage from Virginia to London.
Liberty	Great Britain	The ship was driven ashore on Skagen, Denmark. She was on a voyage from Hamburg to Danzig.
Mary & James	Great Britain	The ship was lost whilst of a voyage from London to Newcastle upon Tyne, Northumberland.
Nancy	Great Britain	The ship was driven ashore at Margate. She was on a voyage from London to Ayre and Irvine, Ayrshire.
Neptune	Great Britain	The ship was lost near Milford. She was on a voyage from Dublin to Milford.
Pitt	Great Britain	The ship was lost whilst on a voyage from Newcastle upon Tyne to London.
Rose Hall	Great Britain	The ship was wrecked off Sandwich, Kent.
Ross	Ireland	The ship was driven ashore and wrecked on Ronaldsay, Orkney Islands, Great Britain. She was on a voyage from Danzig to Belfast.
Sophia Margueretta	France	The ship departed from Newcastle upon Tyne, Northumberland, Great Britain for Bordeaux in early October. No further trace, presumed foundered with the loss of all hands.
St. Joannes	France	The ship was driven ashore and wrecked on Öland, Sweden. She was on a voyage from Bordeaux to Saint Petersburg.
Tweed	Great Britain	The ship was driven ashore near Harwich. She was on a voyage from London to Hamburg.
Triton	Great Britain	The ship was driven ashore on the French coast. She was on a voyage from Plymouth, Devon, to Newcastle upon Tyne.

== November ==
=== 5 November ===
List of shipwrecks: 5 November 1771
Ship	State	Description
Santorin (Санторин)	Imperial Russian Navy	Russo-Turkish War. The frigate ran aground at Mytilene, Greece and was captured. She was burnt by the frigate Severny Oryol (Северный Орёл Imperial Russian Navy).

=== 10 November ===
List of shipwrecks: 10 November 1771
Ship	State	Description
Providence	Great Britain	The ship was wrecked on the Wicklow Banks, in the Irish Sea off the coast of County Wicklow, Ireland. She was on a voyage from Southampton, Hampshire, to Liverpool, Lancashire.

=== 14 November ===
List of shipwrecks: 14 November 1771
Ship	State	Description
John & William	Great Britain	The ship was wrecked on the Cockle Sand, in the North Sea off Great Yarmouth, Norfolk. She was on a voyage from Newcastle upon Tyne, Northumberland, to Dover, Kent.

=== 16 November ===
List of shipwrecks: 16 November 1771
Ship	State	Description
Rose	Great Britain	The ship was wrecked on the Black Rocks, near Leith, Lothian.

=== 17 November ===
List of shipwrecks: 17 November 1771
Ship	State	Description
Britannia	Great Britain	The ship was wrecked on the Sturn Sands, in the North Sea off the coast of County Durham.

=== 23 November ===
List of shipwrecks: 23 November 1771
Ship	State	Description
Elizabeth & Mary	(Kingdom of Great Britain) Guernsey	The ship was lost near Texel, Dutch Republic. Her crew were rescued. She was on a voyage from Copenhagen, Denmark, to Guernsey.

=== 30 November ===
List of shipwrecks: 30 November 1771
Ship	State	Description
Castilla	Spanish Navy	The third rate ship-of-the-line was wrecked at Veracruz, Viceroyalty of Peru. Her crew were rescued. She was on a voyage from Veracruz to Cádiz.

=== Unknown date ===
List of shipwrecks: Unknown date 1771
Ship	State	Description
Frederica Maria	Stettin	The ship foundered in the Baltic Sea. She was on a voyage from London, Great Britain, to Stettin.
Hope	Great Britain	The ship was lost whilst on a voyage from London to Königsburg, Prussia.
John	Great Britain	The ship was lost in the Orkney Islands. She was on a voyage from St Petersburg, Russia, to Chester, Cheshire.
Lady Mitla	Lübeck	The ship was wrecked on the Flemish Banks, in the North Sea off the Dutch coast. Her crew were rescued. She was on a voyage from Lübeck to Bordeaux, France.
London Packet	Great Britain	The ship ran aground in the Isles of Scilly. She was on a voyage from Bordeaux to London. She was later refloated and taken in to St. Mary's.
Mary	Great Britain	The ship ran aground on the Fair Ness Rock, off Margate, Kent. She s on a voyage from Maryland, British America, to London.
Mary	Great Britain	The ship was lost near Dunkirk, France. Her crew were rescued.
Mary	Great Britain	The ship foundered in the Baltic Sea. She was on a voyage from Stockholm, Sweden, to London.
Pelican	Sweden	The ship was driven ashore in the Garonne 18 nautical miles (33 km) downstream of Bordeaux, France. She was on a voyage from Norrköping to Bordeaux.
Primrose	Great Britain	The ship was lost in the Orkney Islands. She was on a voyage from Riga, Russia, to Borrowstounness, Lothian.
Printemps	France	The ship was lost at Brest with the loss of all but three of her crew. She was on a voyage from Saint-Domingue to Nantes.
Speedwell	Great Britain	The ship was lost near Memel, Prussia. She was on a voyage from Borrowstounness to Riga.
Susannah	Great Britain	The ship was driven ashore at Formby, Lancashire. She was on a voyage from Glasgow, Renfrewshire to Liverpool.
Vrow Englina	Russia	The ship foundered in the Baltic Sea. She was on a voyage from Saint Petersburg to the Straits of Gibraltar.
Will	Great Britain	The ship was lost near Tralie, County Cork, Ireland. She was on a voyage from Saint Kitts to Liverpool.

== December ==
=== 8 December ===
List of shipwrecks: 8 December 1771
Ship	State	Description
Concord	Great Britain	The ship was wrecked on the Barber Sand, in the North Sea off Great Yarmouth, Norfolk. Her crew were rescued.

=== 9 December ===
List of shipwrecks: 9 December 1771
Ship	State	Description
Grant	Great Britain	The ship foundered in the North Sea. Her crew were rescued. She was on a voyage from Bremen to Newcastle upon Tyne, Northumberland and London.
Royal Charlotte	Great Britain	The ship was driven ashore and wrecked near Boulogne, France. Her crew were rescued. She was on a voyage from the Grenades to London.
Twee Gesusters	Dutch Republic	The ship was driven ashore and wrecked near Dartmouth, Devon, Great Britain. Her crew were rescued She was on a voyage from Ostend to Bordeaux, France.

=== 10 December ===
List of shipwrecks: 10 December 1771
Ship	State	Description
Margaret	Great Britain	The ship struck rocks in the Isles of Scilly and was wrecked with the loss of all but two of her crew. She was on a voyage from Newfoundland to Poole, Dorset.

=== 20 December ===
List of shipwrecks: 20 December 1771
Ship	State	Description
Elizabeth	Great Britain	The ship was wrecked on the Stagg Rocks, Cornwall. Her crew were rescued. She was on a voyage from London to South Carolina, British America.
Montague	Great Britain	The ship foundered off the Knock John Sand, in the Thames Estuary with the loss of all hands. She was on a voyage from Seville, Spain, to London.

=== 24 December ===
List of shipwrecks: 24 December 1771
Ship	State	Description
Jane Pierne	Dutch Republic	The ship foundered in the Atlantic Ocean off the coast of Virginia, British America Her crew were rescued. She was on a voyage from Sint Eustatius to Amsterdam.
Peggy	(Kingdom of Great Britain) British America	The sloop was driven ashore and wrecked on Ocracock Island, North Carolina. Her crew were rescued.

=== 29 December ===
List of shipwrecks: 29 December 1771
Ship	State	Description
Marianna	France	The ship was driven ashore and wrecked near Hastings, Sussex, Great Britain. Her crew were rescued. She was on a voyage from Bordeaux to Dunkirk.

=== Unknown date ===
List of shipwrecks: Unknown date 1771
Ship	State	Description
Bilboa	Spain	The ship was lost at Bilbao. She was on a voyage from Marblehead, Massachusetts, British America to Bilbao.
Britannia	Great Britain	The ship was lost at San Sebastián, Spain, with the loss of all hands. She was on a voyage from Newfoundland, British America to San Sebastián.
Calvert	Great Britain	The ship was driven ashore and wrecked on the south coast of the Isle of Wight. All on board were rescued.
Carolus	Sweden	The ship was wrecked on the Haisborough Sands, in the North Sea off the coast of Norfolk, Great Britain. She was on a voyage from Stockholm to Liverpool, Lancashire, Great Britain.
Charlestown	Great Britain	The ship foundered in the Baltic Sea.
Concordia	Sweden	The ship was wrecked on the Goodwin Sands, Kent, Great Britain. Her crew were rescued. She was on a voyage from Gothenburg to Gibraltar.
Derby	Great Britain	The ship was wrecked in the Orkney Islands. She was on a voyage from Danzig to Liverpool.
Duke of Cornwall	Great Britain	The ship was driven ashore at Penzance, Cornwall.
Endeavour	Great Britain	The ship was driven ashore at Penzance. She was on a voyage from Chester, Cheshire, to Havre de Grâce, France.
Five Brothers	Hanover	The ship was wrecked on the Maastersand, in the North Sea. She was on a voyage from Gothenburg, Sweden, to Emden.
Fortune	Great Britain	The ship was lost in December.
Friendship	Prussia	The ship foundered in the Skaggerak. She was on a voyage from "Neckmoncrieff" to Königsburg.
Grenada	Great Britain	The gally foundered in the Baltic Sea with the loss of five of her crew.
Hawke	Great Britain	The ship was wrecked on the coast of Cornwall with some loss of life. She was on a voyage from South Carolina, British America, to London.
Jenny	Great Britain	The ship foundered in the Baltic Sea with the loss of all hands. She was on a voyage from Saint Petersburg, Russia, to Hull, Yorkshire.
John	Ireland	The ship was driven ashore and wrecked on the coast of County Wexford. She was on a voyage from Porto to Dublin.
Lowther & Seahorse	Great Britain	The ship was driven ashore at Whitehaven, Cumberland. She was on a voyage from Jamaica to Whitehaven.
Nancy	Great Britain	The ship struck rocks at Bullens Bay and was wrecked. Six of her crew were rescued. She was on a voyage from Virginia to Whitehaven.
Nancy	Great Britain	The ship was lost at Milford, Pembrokeshire. She was on a voyage from Newfoundland to Bristol.
Nelly	Great Britain	The ship foundered in the Baltic Sea.
Nelly	Great Britain	The ship ran aground on the Kentish Knock. She was on a voyage from Virginia to London.
Nelly	Great Britain	The ship was in collision with a collier in the River Thames and was consequently beached. She was on a voyage from Virginia to London.
Neptune	Ireland	The ship was driven ashore and wrecked at Dublin. Her crew were rescued. She was on a voyage from Dublin to Virginia.
Neptune	Great Britain	The ship foundered off Margate, Kent. She was on a voyage from Boston to Hull.
Newark	Great Britain	The ship was driven ashore at Penzance.
New Blessing	Great Britain	The ship was lost in December.
Purse Anna	France	The ship was driven ashore near Faro, Portugal. She was on a voyage from Cette to La Rochelle.
Reading	Great Britain	The ship was driven ashore and wrecked on the coast of Jutland. She was on a voyage from Saint Petersburg to London.
Sam	Great Britain	The ship was wrecked on the coast of Ireland. Her crew were rescued by Bridge (Great Britain). Sam was on a voyage from Africa to Barbados and Liverpool.
St Nicholas	France	The ship was lost near Ayamonte, Spain. She was on a voyage from Havre de Grâce to Cádiz, Spain.
Tayrles Bay	Great Britain	The ship was driven ashore and wrecked at Plymouth with the loss of six of her crew. She was on a voyage from London to Saint Vincent.
Three Brothers	Great Britain	The ship was driven ashore and wrecked on the Irish coast with some loss of life. She was on a voyage from London to Galway.
Tryan	Great Britain	The ship was driven ashore on the coast of Glamorgan. She was on a voyage from New York, British America, to Bristol, Gloucestershire.
Two Brothers	Great Britain	The ship foundered at Liverpool. Her crew were rescued by a pilot boat. She was on a voyage from South Carolina to Liverpool.
Two Friends	Great Britain	The ship was driven ashore and wrecked at Plymouth. She was on a voyage from Waterford, Ireland, to Pool, Dorset.
Vine	Great Britain	The ship was driven ashore and wrecked near Wexford, Ireland. She was on a voyage from Porto to Liverpool.

== Unknown date ==
List of shipwrecks: Unknown date 1771
Ship	State	Description
Admiral Hawke	Great Britain	The ship foundered in the Atlantic Ocean 70 leagues (210 nautical miles (390 km) west of Cape Clear Island, County Cork, Ireland. Her crew were rescued.
Amiable	France	The ship was lost whilst on a voyage from Cap-François, Saint-Domingue to Dunkirk.
Betsey	Great Britain	The ship was lost in the Old Topsail Inlet, North Carolina, British America. Her crew were rescued. She was on a voyage from London to North Carolina.
Bonaventura	(Kingdom of Great Britain) British America	The ship was lost between St. John's Island and Louisbourgh Island, Quebec. She was on a voyage from Bonaventura, Quebec, to Gaspay, Quebec and the West Indies.
Cambleton	Great Britain	The ship was lost at Bermuda. She was on a voyage from Maryland, British America, to Glasgow, Renfrewshire.
Champion	Great Britain	The ship was lost off Cephalonia, Venetian Republic. She was on a voyage from the Current Islands to Bristol, Gloucestershire.
Charming Nelly	Great Britain	The ship foundered in the Atlantic Ocean. Her crew were rescued by a French vessel. She was on a voyage from London to Antigua.
Duke of Bridgwater	Great Britain	African slave trade: The ship was captured by the slaves on board and was burnt.
Enterprize	Great Britain	The whaler was lost off the coast of Greenland.
Fly	Great Britain	African slave trade: The ship was wrecked on the African coast. Nine slaves were rescued.
Greyhound	Great Britain	The ship capsized in the Atlantic Ocean. Her crew were rescued by a French vessel from Martinique. She was on a voyage from the Piscataqua River, British America to Barbados.
Jason	Great Britain	The ship was destroyed by fire at Saint-Domingue.
Jenny	(Kingdom of Great Britain) Jersey	The ship was run down and sunk in the Grand Banks of Newfoundland. Her crew were rescued.
John	Great Britain	The ship foundered in the Grand Banks of Newfoundland. Her crew were rescued.
Kitty	Great Britain	The ship foundered in the Atlantic Ocean off Cape Charles, Virginia, British America.
Las Tres Puentes	Spain	The galleon was lost off the coast of Florida, British America.
Lively	Great Britain	The ship was driven ashore on the coast of North Carolina, British America. She was on a voyage from Grenades to North Carolina.
Nassau	Great Britain	The ship was lost near Canso, Nova Scotia. Her crew were rescued. she was on a voyage from London to Boston, Massachusetts.
New Hampshire	(Kingdom of Great Britain) British America	The ship sank in the Neuse River whilst heading for Goldsborough, North Carolina.
New Parham	Great Britain	The ship was destroyed by fire in the Atlantic Ocean. Her crew were rescued. She was on a voyage from London to Antigua.
Nonsuch	Great Britain	The ship was lost on the Colorados. Her crew survived. She was on a voyage from Jamaica to South Carolina, British America.
Nuestra Señora del Rosario	Spain	The galleon was lost off the coast of Florida.
Orriflame	Spain	The ship was lost near Valparaíso, Chile with the loss of all hands. She was on a voyage from Cádiz to Lima, Viceroyalty of Peru.
Peggy	Great Britain	The whaler was sunk off the coast of Greenland by ice.
Polly	Great Britain	The ship foundered in Devoconnus Bay, Grenada.
Pomona	France	The ship foundered. Her crew were rescued by an English vessel. She was on a voyage from Port-au-Prince, Hispaniola, to Bordeaux.
Prince of Wales	Great Britain	The ship was wrecked on the coast of Africa.
Prudent Sally	Great Britain	The ship was presumed to have foundered whilst on a voyage from Bristol to Philadelphia, Pennsylvania, British America.
Queen of May	Great Britain	The ship capsized in the Delaware River, British America with some loss of life. She was on a voyage from Philadelphia to Lisbon, Portugal.
Rose	Ireland	The ship sank in the Saint Lawrence River, British America. She was on a voyage from Quebec to Cork.
Rubie	Ireland	The ship was wrecked at Oakricock, North Carolina, British America before 13 April. She was on a voyage from Londonderry to North Carolina.
Rutland	Great Britain	The ship was wrecked whilst on a voyage from Saint Vincent to Philadelphia.
St. George & St. Elizabeth	Ottoman Empire	The ship was driven ashore and wrecked near Smyrna. She was on a voyage from Constantinople to Smyrna.
Swansey	Great Britain	The ship was driven ashore and wrecked on Sable Island, British America. She was on a voyage from Rhode Island, to Newfoundland.
Teddington	Great Britain	The ship foundered in the Atlantic Ocean. Her crew were rescued by Harmony (Great Britain). Teddington was on a voyage from New England, British America, to London.
Tryal	Great Britain	The whaler was lost off the coast of Greenland.
Victoria	Spain	The ship foundered in the Atlantic Ocean off Cape Florida, British America. She was on a voyage from Veracruz, Viceroyalty of Peru to Cádiz.
