= Erdbeerkopf =

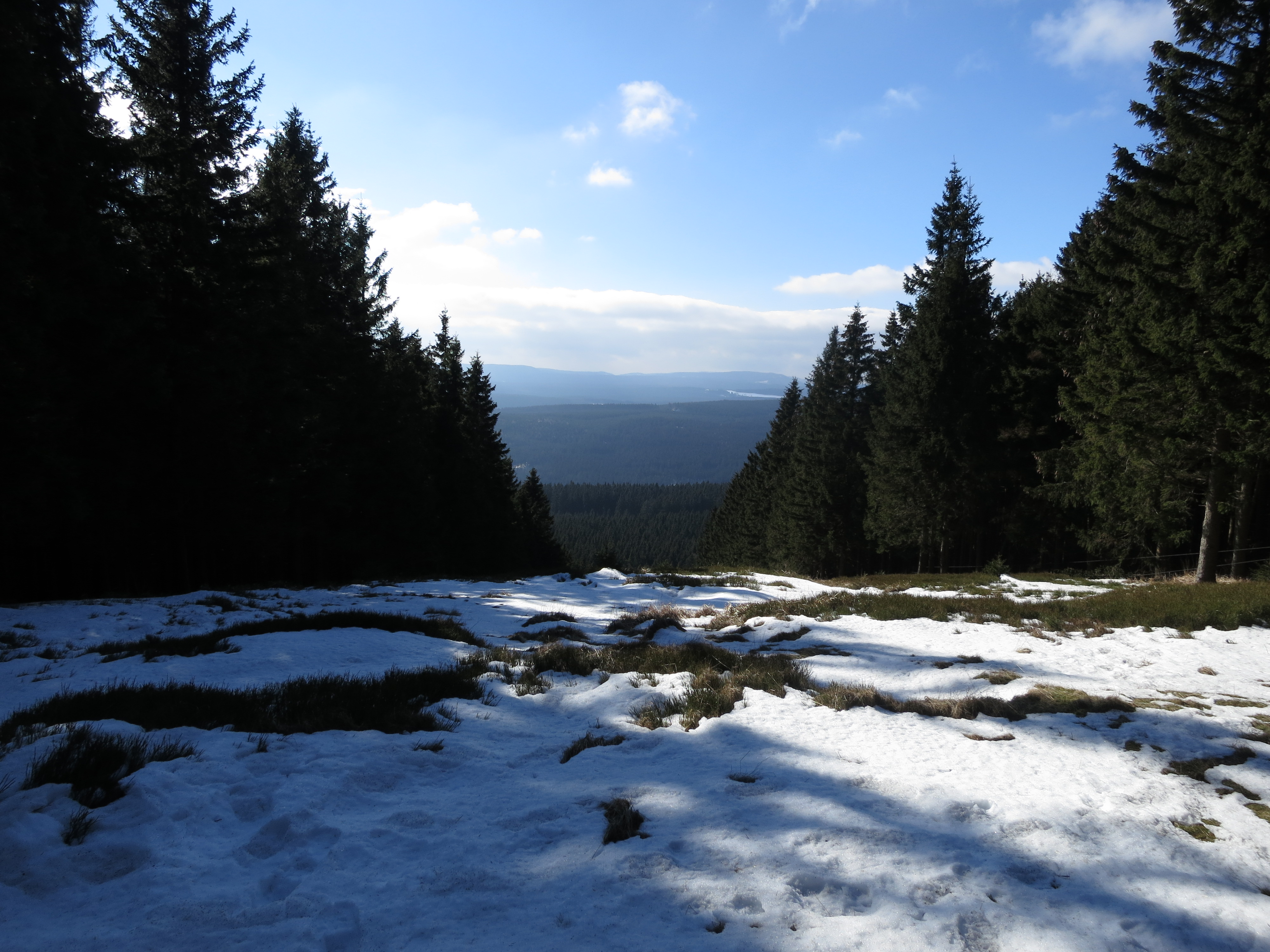
- View from the Erdbeerkopf through the firebreak of the old ski piste looking south-southwest.

Highest point
- Elevation: 847.7 m above sea level (NHN) (2,781 ft)
- Coordinates: 51°46′26″N 10°40′43″E

Geography
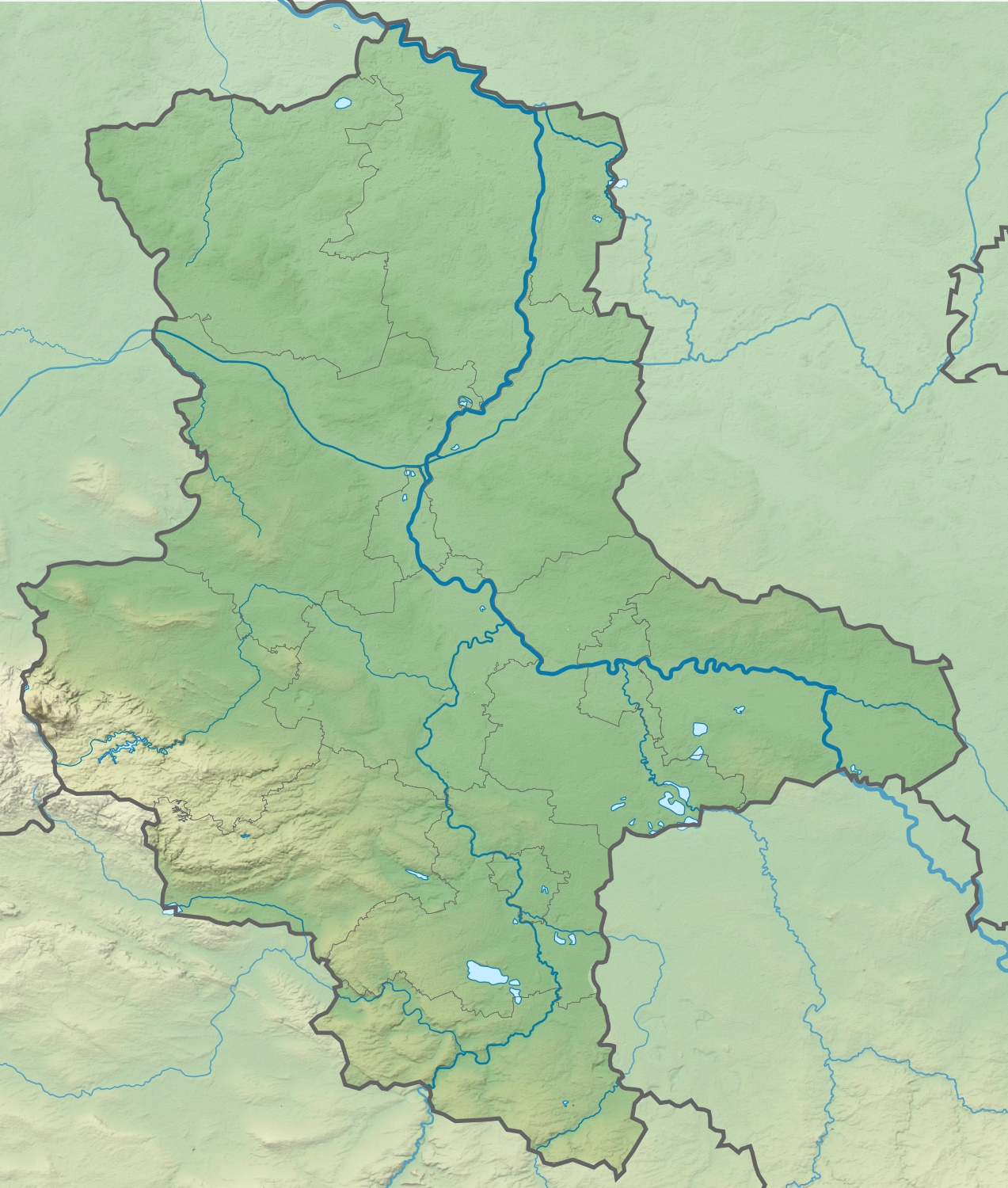
- Location within Saxony-Anhalt
- Location: Near Schierke; Harz, Saxony-Anhalt, Germany
- Parent range: Harz Mountains (Upper Harz; High Harz)

The Erdbeerkopf is an 847.7-metre-high (2,781 ft) mountain in the High Harz in central Germany, northeast of Schierke in the state of Saxony-Anhalt.

To the north and east, the forested summit is bordered by the Wormsgraben, the valley of the Wormke. To the south runs the Brocken Railway along the slopes of the Erdbeerkopf.

There are two paths leading to the mountain, from the east and west. To the southwest a field runs downhill that used to be a ski slope. The remains of a derelict ski lift can still be seen there. The mountain is very rarely climbed despite its accessible location. On the summit is a wooden bench from where part of the South Harz can be seen through the gap in the trees.

== See also ==
- List of mountains and hills in Saxony-Anhalt
