= List of mountains and hills of Saxony-Anhalt =

This List of mountains and hills in Saxony-Anhalt shows a selection of high or well-known mountain and hills in the German state of Saxony-Anhalt (in order of height). Mountains are defined here as being over 2,000 feet (610 m).

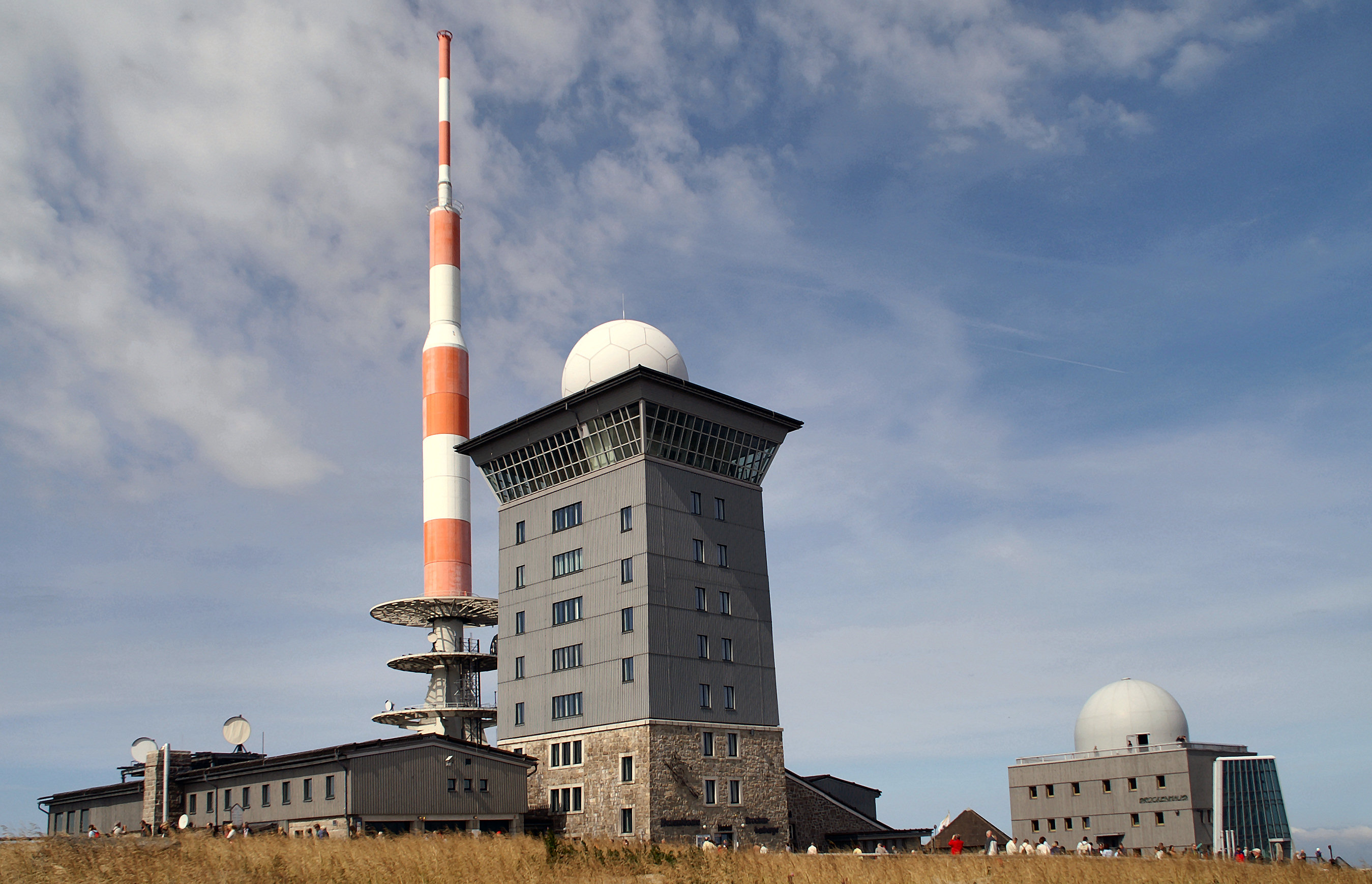
Brocken

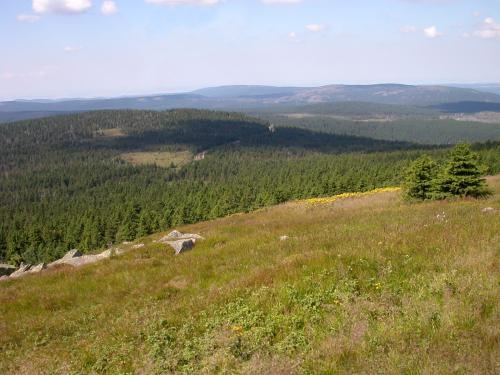
Königsberg

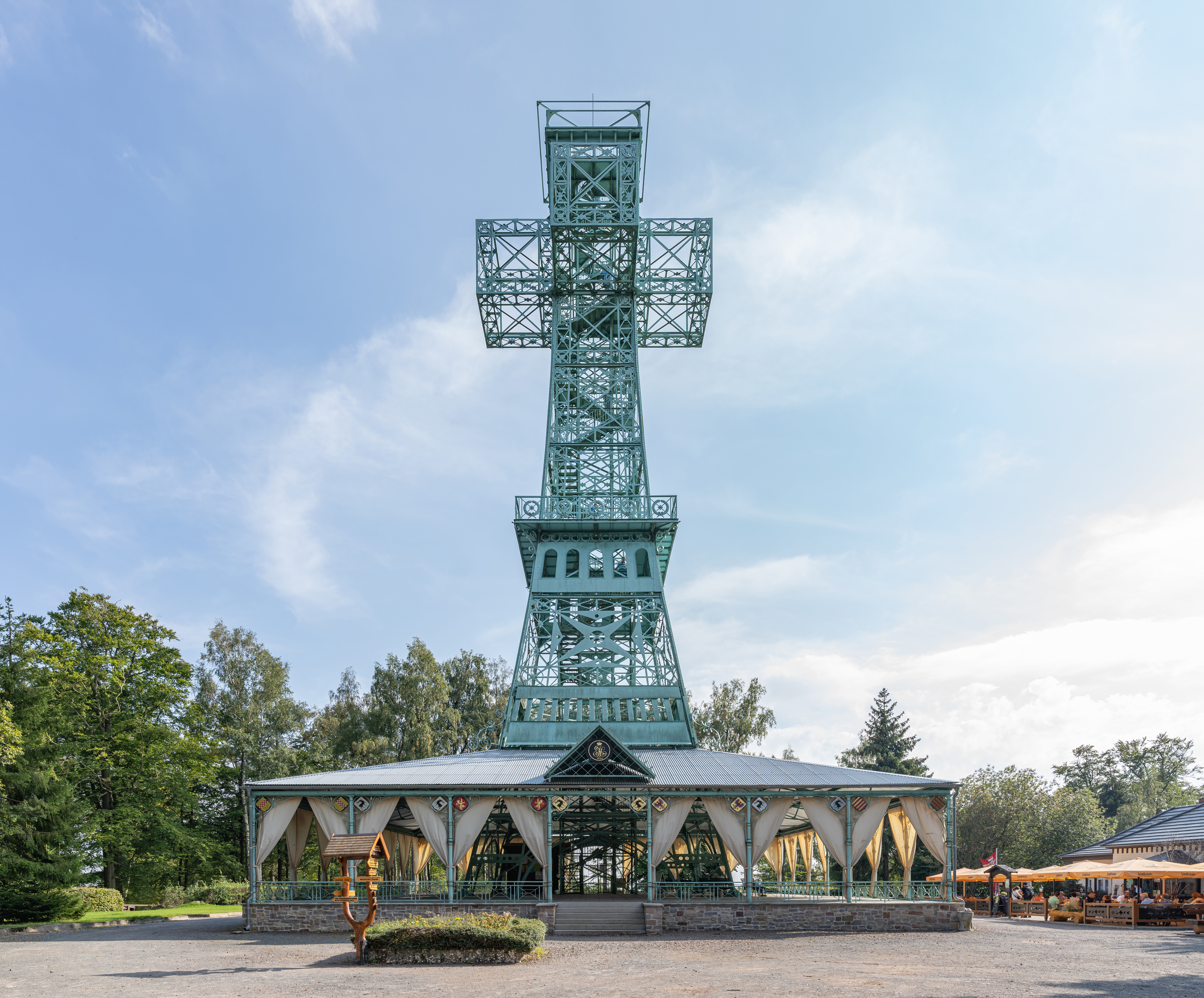
Großer Auerberg

== Mountains ==
Name, Height in metres above sea level, Location (District/Region)

1. Brocken (1,141.1 metres (3,744 ft)), Harz district, Harz
  - Heinrichshöhe (1,044 m), Harz district
  - Königsberg (1.023 m), Harz district
  - Kleiner Brocken (1,019 m), Harz district
2. Renneckenberg (933 m), Harz district
3. Pferdekopf (857 m), Harz district
4. Erdbeerkopf (848 m), Harz district
5. Kleiner Winterberg (837 m), Harz district
6. Großer Jägerkopf (745 m), Harz district
7. Wolfsklippen (723 m), Harz district
8. Scharfenstein (696 m), Harz district
9. Oberer Meineckenberg (644 m), Harz district
10. Carlshaushöhe (626 metres (2,054 ft)), Harz district

== Hills ==
1. Großer Gierskopf (595 metres (1,952 ft)), Harz district
2. Schalliete (595 m), Harz district
3. Zwißelkopf (587 m), Harz district
4. Ramberg (582 m), Harz district
5. Großer Auerberg (580 m), Mansfeld-Südharz district, Harz
6. Rauher Jacob (568 m), Harz district
7. Ortberg (549 m), Harz district
8. Leckenkopf (546 m), Harz district
9. Großer Hornberg (537 m), Harz district
10. Großer Stemberg (517 m), Harz district
11. Büchenberg (516 m), Harz district
12. Hilmersberg (507 m), Harz district
13. Bockberg (495 m), Harz district
14. Hohe Warte (374 m), Harz district
15. Schimmelsberg (324 m), Mansfeld-Südharz district, Harz
16. Buchenberg (314 m), Harz district, Huy
17. Orlas (305 m), Landkreis Burgenlandkreis, Finne
18. Großer Fallstein (288 m), Harz district, Fallstein
19. Butterberg (Ilsenburg) (279 m), Harz district
20. Petersberg (251 m), Saale district
21. Domburg (241 m), Harz district, Hakel
22. Bullenberg (210.6 m), Börde district, Lappwald
23. Edelberg (209 m), Börde district, Hohes Holz
24. Kniel (205 m), Börde district, southeastern extension of the Lappwald Ridge
25. Hohe Gieck (193 m), Wittenberg district, Düben Heath Nature Park
26. Michelsberg (185 m), Wittenberg district, Fläming
27. Hirseberg (184 m), Wittenberg district, Fläming
28. Langer Berg (160 m), Altmarkkreis Salzwedel, Zichtau Forest and Hellberge
29. Großer Wartberg (146 m), Börde district, Börde
30. Butterberg (141 m), Börde district, Flechtingen Hills
31. Wartenberg (121 m), Salzland district, Börde
32. Ochsenberg (109 m), Salzland district
33. Kappaun-Berg (105,4 m), Landkreis Jerichower Land
34. Dolchauer Berg (95 metres (312 ft)), Salzwedel district, Kalbescher Werder

== See also ==
- List of the highest mountains in Germany
- List of the highest mountains in the German states
- List of mountain and hill ranges in Germany
