= Königshütte =

Königshütte may refer to:

- Königshütte (Silesia), German name for Chorzów, Poland
- Königshütte (Harz), a village in Germany
