= Königshütte Waterfall =

Coordinates: 51°45′04″N 10°45′13″E

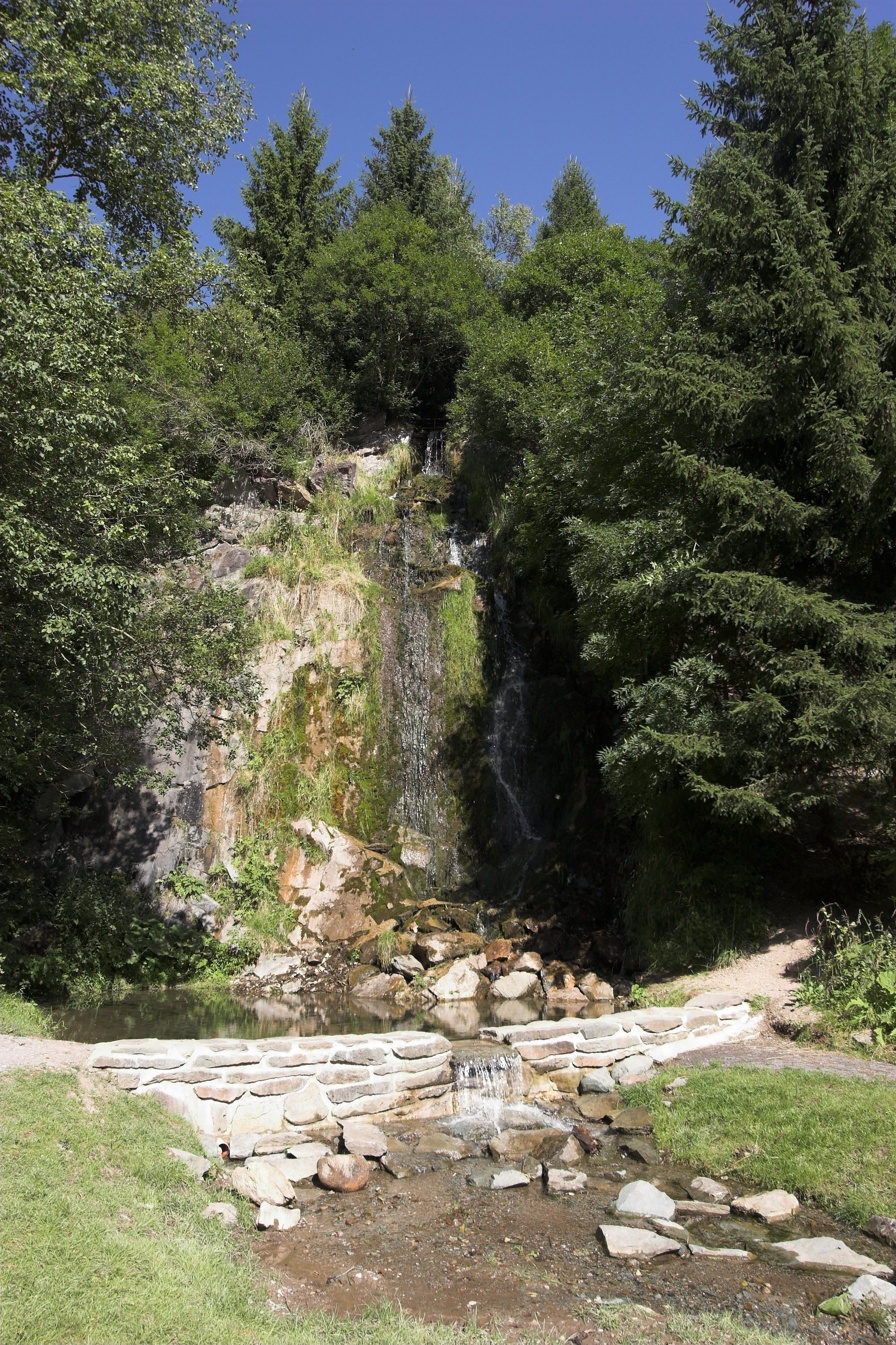
Königshütte Waterfall

Königshütte Waterfall (German: Königshütter Wasserfall) is a waterfall in the village of Königshütte in the borough of Oberharz am Brocken in the Harz Mountains of Central Germany.

The waterfall has a relatively low volume and falls through a height of 12 metres (some sources give 15 or 20 metres). The stream empties shortly thereafter into the Kalte Bode. The waterfall is man-made and was constructed in connexion with an old quarry in 1994.

The Bundesstraße 27 federal road runs close by. The area around the waterfall has been turned into a small park area. At the top of the falls at the viewing point is checkpoint no. 40 in the Harzer Wandernadel hiking network.

== See also ==
- Waterfalls in Germany
