= Mandelholz Dam =

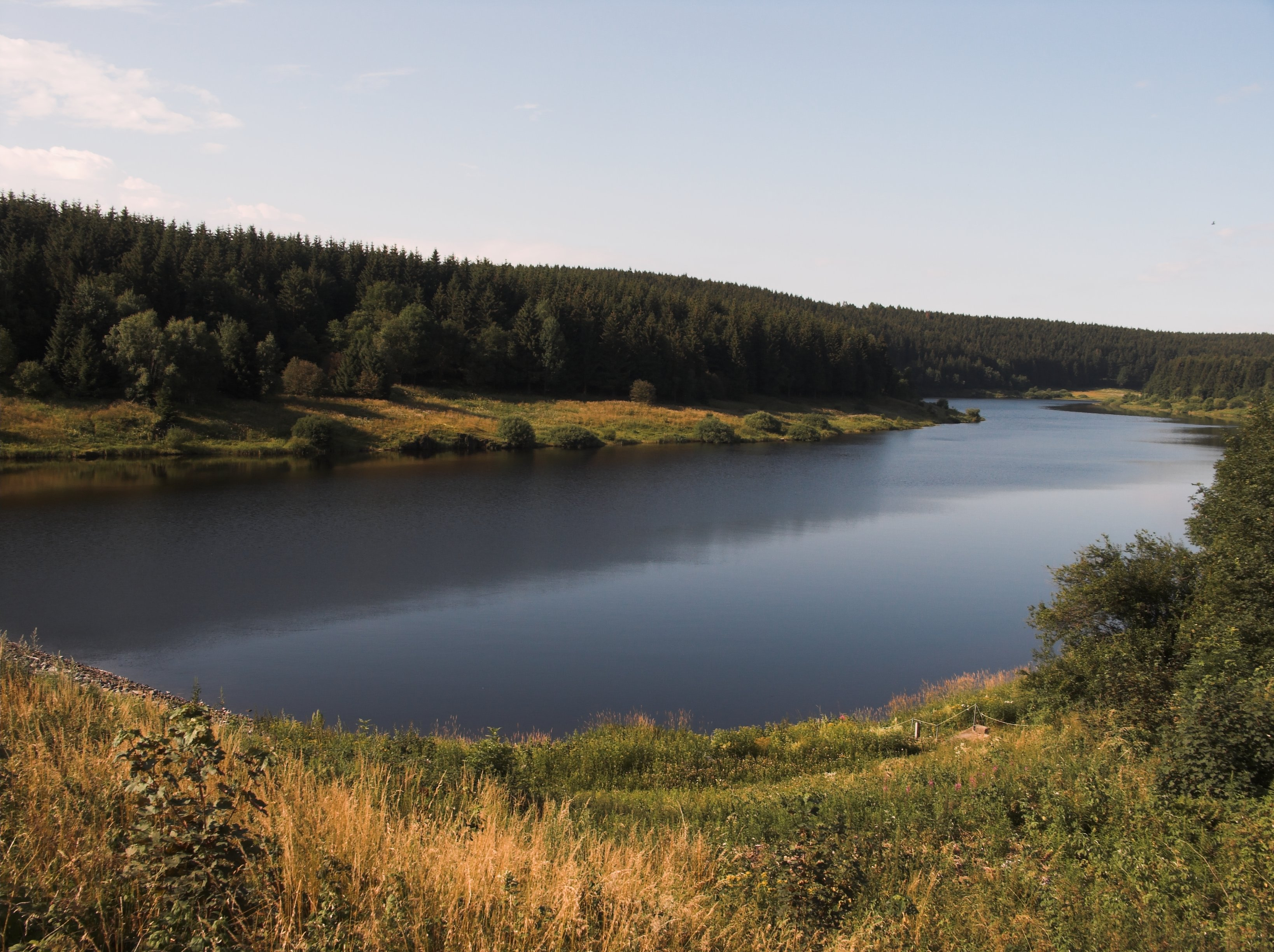
- Reservoir of the Mandelholz Dam

- Location within Germany
- Country: Germany
- Location: Harz, Saxony-Anhalt
- Coordinates: 51°44′44″N 10°44′11″E
- Construction began: 1952
- Opening date: 1957

Dam and spillways
- Type of dam: Embankment dam
- Impounds: Kalte Bode
- Height: 28.4 m (93 ft)
- Length: 224 m (735 ft)
- Dam volume: 197,000 m (646,000 ft)

Reservoir
- Total capacity: 4,470,000 m^{3} (158,000,000 ft^{3})

The Mandelholz Dam (German: Mandelholztalsperre) holds back the Kalte Bode Flood Control Basin (Hochwasserschutzbecken Kalte Bode) which is a flood protection reservoir located between the villages of Elend and Königshütte near Wernigerode in the Harz mountains of Germany. It impounds the waters of the Kalte Bode when water levels are high.

The dam was built from 1952 to 1957 and consists of an earth-fill dam with integrated concrete inspection walkway. In order to protect the crest from overspill, a spillway has been constructed south of it to handle excess water. The last time the dam was overspilled due to high water was in 1994.

The height of the dam is variously given as 26 m (probably height above valley floor) or 28.4 m (probably structural height).

Near Mandelholz on the Wormke (to the rear of the Mandelholz Dam) are the ruins of an older dam that supplied the Mandelholz Iron Works with water from 1612. Catastrophic flooding in 1855 destroyed the dam and it was not rebuilt.

The name Mandelholz as a place name may be derived from the spruce forests in the area, because spruce trees used to be called Mandel in German.

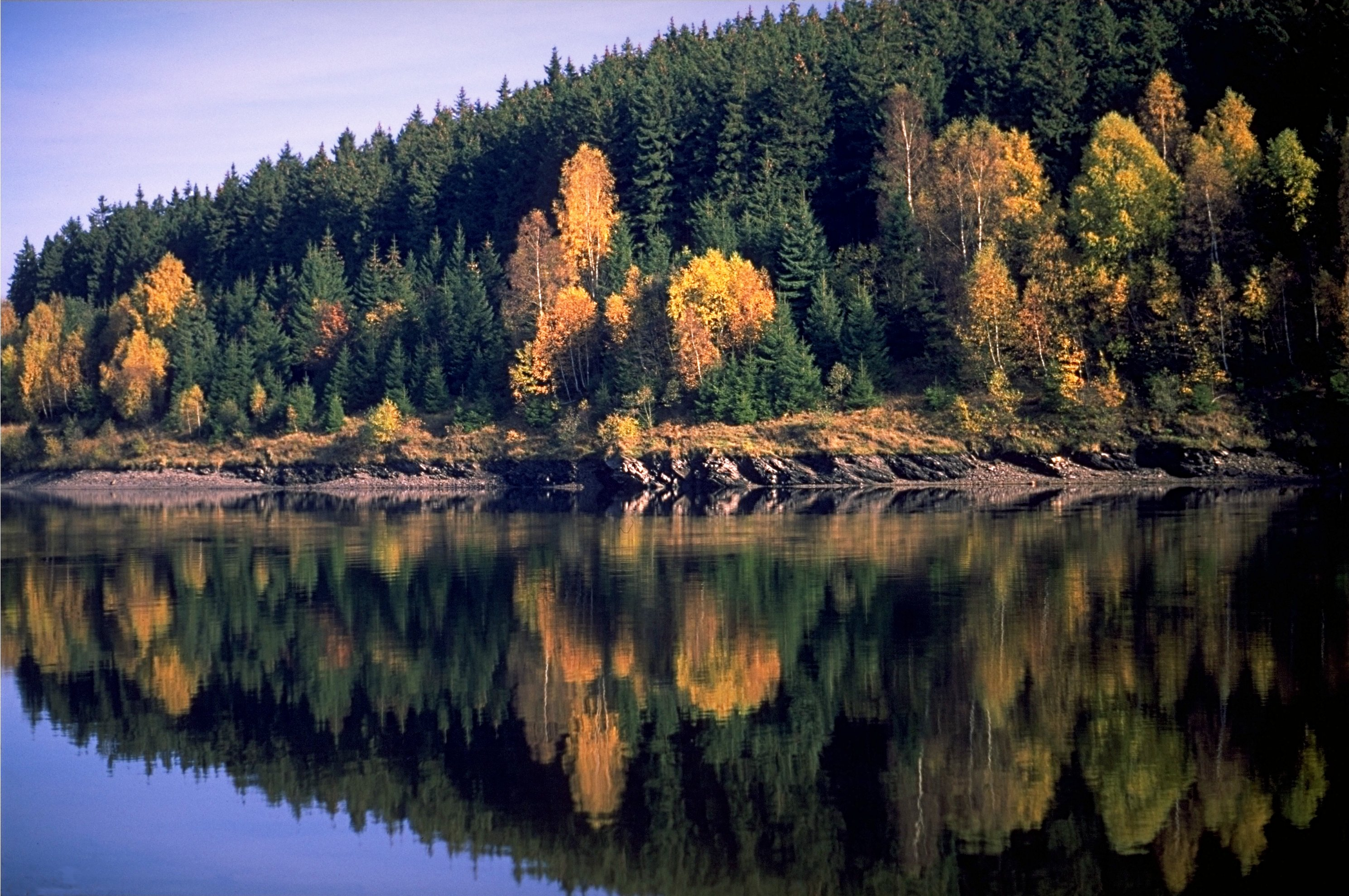
East shore of the reservoir in autumn

== See also ==
- List of dams and reservoirs in Germany
- List of dams in the Harz
