= Ackertklippe =

Rock formation in Königshütte, Harz, Germany

Coordinates: 51°44′38″N 10°45′56″E

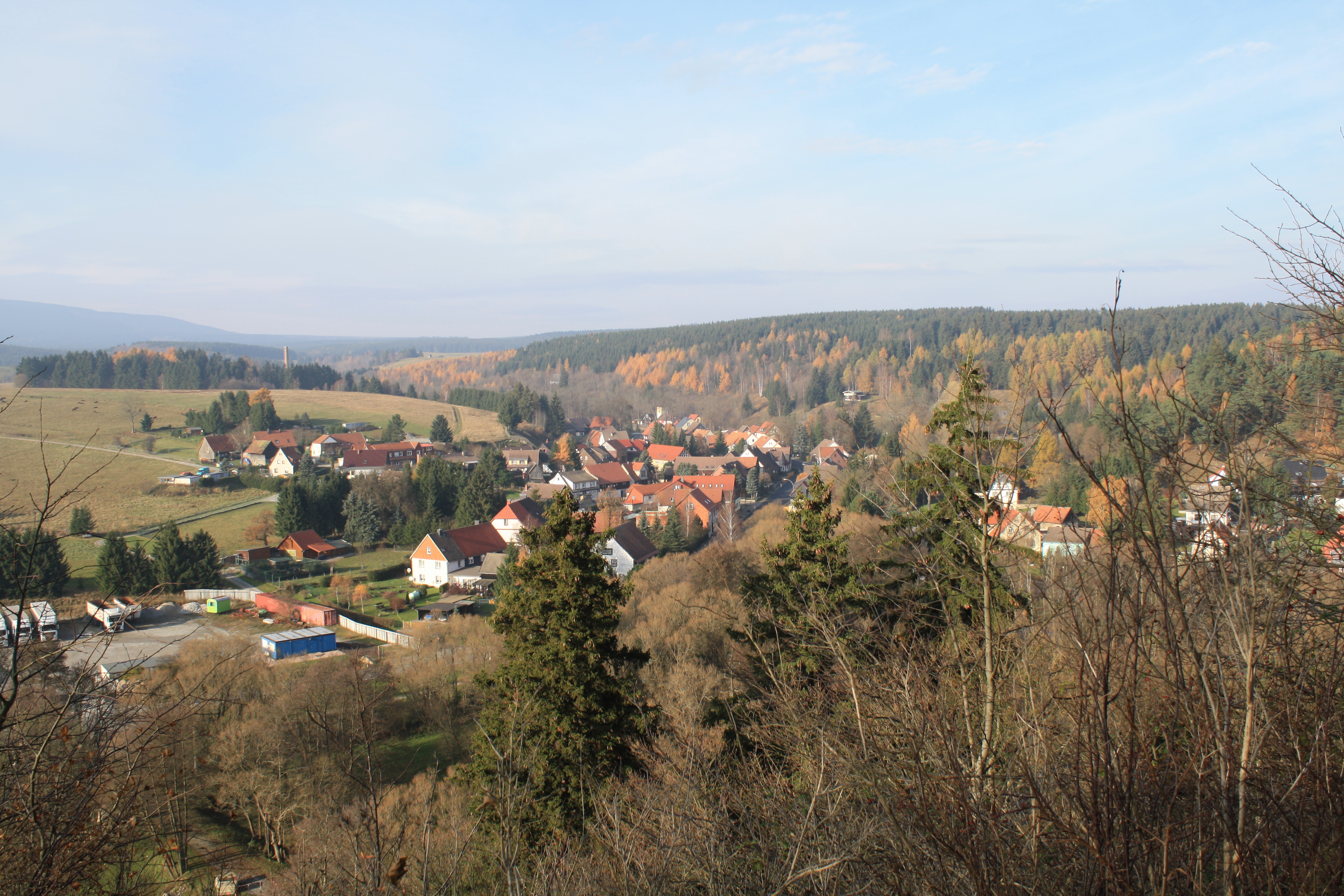
View from the Königsburg: right, behind the trees, the Ackertklippe

The Ackertklippe is a rock formation in Königshütte in the district of Harz in the Harz mountains of Germany. It is composed mainly of granite. A nearby road is named after the crag.

The crag can be climbed by a footpath. A refuge hut was built on the summit at the beginning of the 20th century. From the crag there is a comprehensive view of the village, the river Bode and the surrounding Harz mountains as far as the Wurmberg and the Brocken. The Ackertklippe rock formation also lends its name to the pub and boarding house Am Felsen, which is located below the crag on the Bode.

The Ackertklippe hosts regular events such as Easter Fire (Osterfeuer) and Walpurgis Night.

== See also ==
List of rock formations in the Harz
