= Wormsgraben =

River in Germany

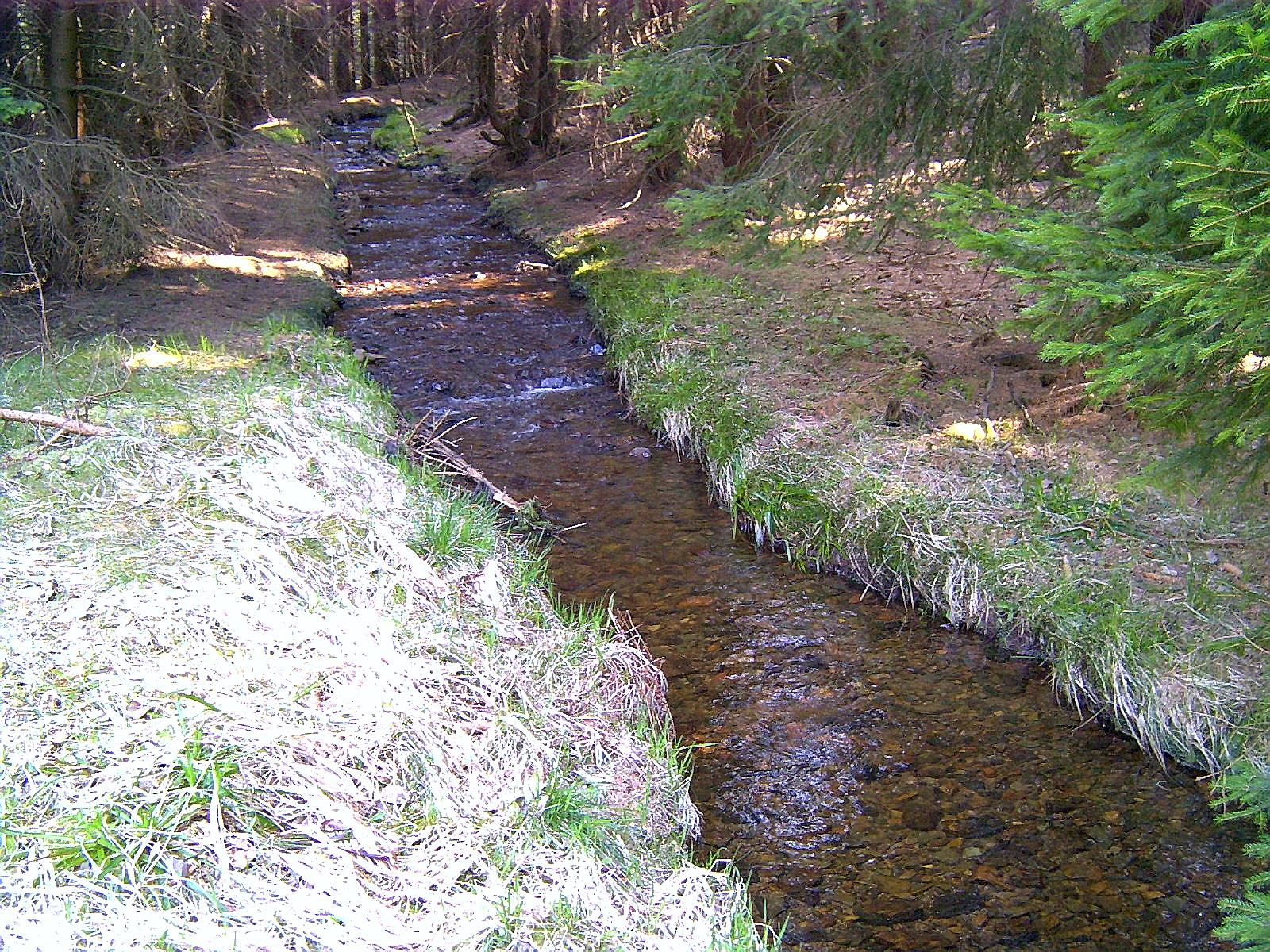
- The Wormsgraben west of the Glashüttenweg path

Location
- Location: in the Harz; Landkreis Harz, Saxony-Anhalt (Germany)
- Reference no.: DE: 56862(1)

Physical characteristics
- Source
  - location: fork: near the Erdbeerkopf from the Wormke
  - coordinates: 51°46′23.4″N 10°41′13.7″E
  - elevation: ca. 747 m above sea level (NHN)
- Mouth
  - location: Einleitung: near Drei Annen Hohne into the Zillierbach
  - coordinates: 51°46′21.6″N 10°43′20.1″E
  - elevation: ca. 575 m above sea level (NHN)
- Length: 2.1 km
- Basin size: 3.2 km^{2}

Basin features
- Progression: Zillierbach → Holtemme → Bode → Saale → Elbe → North Sea
- River system: Elbe

The Wormsgraben is a waterway in the Harz Mountains of central Germany in the state of Saxony-Anhalt.

== Location ==
The Wormsgraben is located 1 to 3 km west of Drei Annen Hohne and 1 km south of the Hohneklippen rocks. The River Wormke, which empties into the Kalte Bode near Mandelholz (a part of Elend), is in its upper reaches fed through a weir into the Wormsgraben. Initially most of the river's waters were diverted into the Wormsgraben channel, today all the water flows this way. After the Wormsgraben is crossed by the Glashütten Way (Glashüttenweg i.e. Glassworks Way) at the Sandgrube, it discharges into the Zillierbach near the forest lodge of Hohne. The artificial ditch drains the water of the Bode and leads it to the catchment area of the Zillierbach-Holtemme, in order to transfer it after 48 km to the Bode in the northern Harz Foreland. Due to a steep gradient and high rate of flow a high (up to 1 m) and wide embankment is needed on the downhill side of the channel.

== See also ==
- List of rivers of Saxony-Anhalt
