= Bockberg =

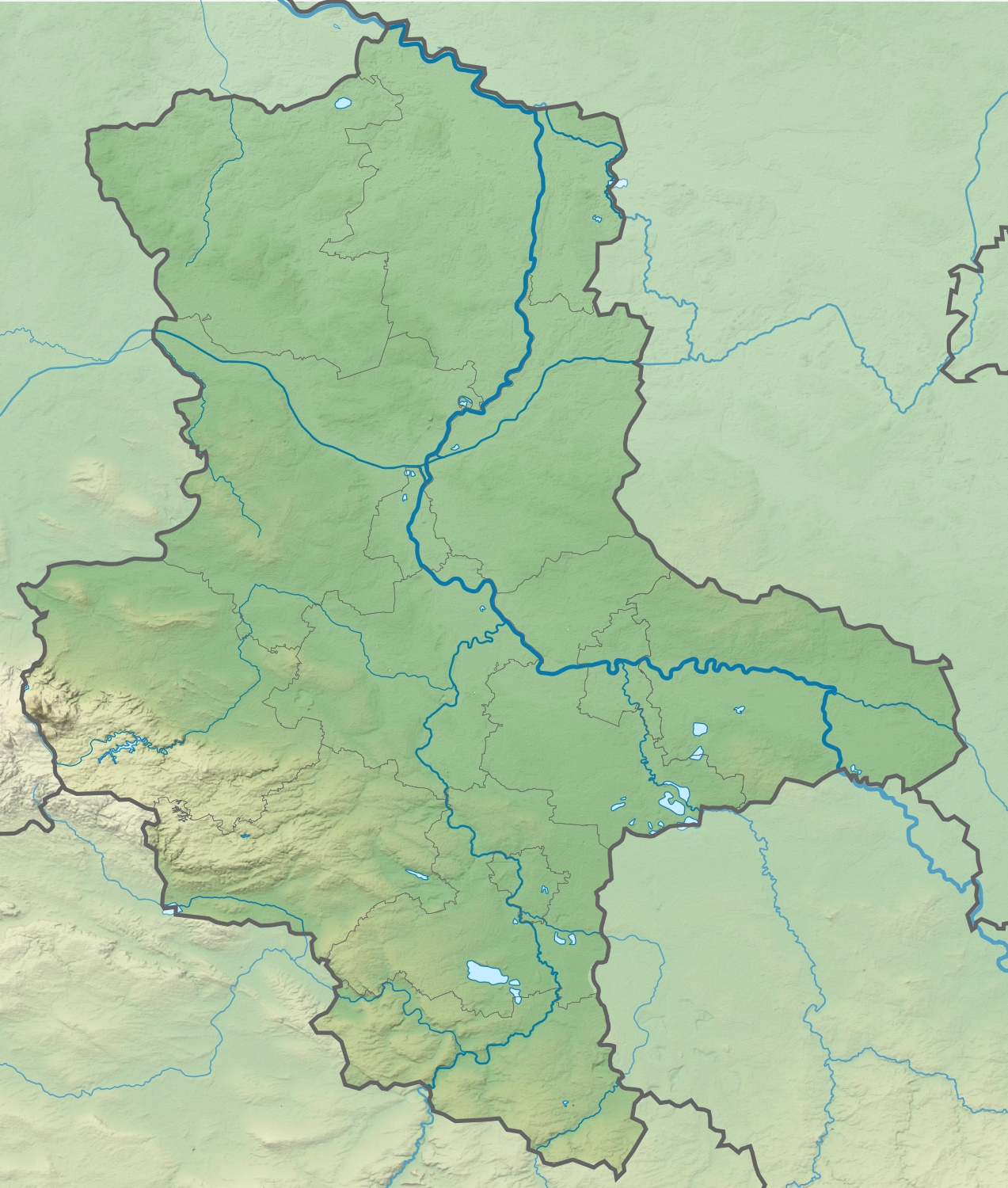
- Location within Saxony-Anhalt

Highest point
- Elevation: 495 m above sea level (NN) (1,624 ft)
- Coordinates: 51°45′10″N 10°45′41″E

Geography
- Location: Sachsen-Anhalt, Germany
- Parent range: Harz Mountains

The Bockberg is a hill, 495 m above sea level (NN), near Königshütte in Harz district in the Harz mountains of central Germany. Since 1967 the hill and its surrounding area have been protected as a nature reserve.

The Bockberg rises immediately north of a loop in the B 27 federal road at the village of Neue Hütte. On its southwestern slopes, part of a volcano, formed in the Devonian sea, can be seen. Rubble from keratophyre lava in a white, potash matrix, has built a volcanic breccia here, which contains veins of hematite.

The plateau of the Bockberg is extensively karstified. Many rare flowers thrive on the fields of yellow oat-grass and semi-dry pasture, including the globe flower.
