= Wormke =

River in Germany

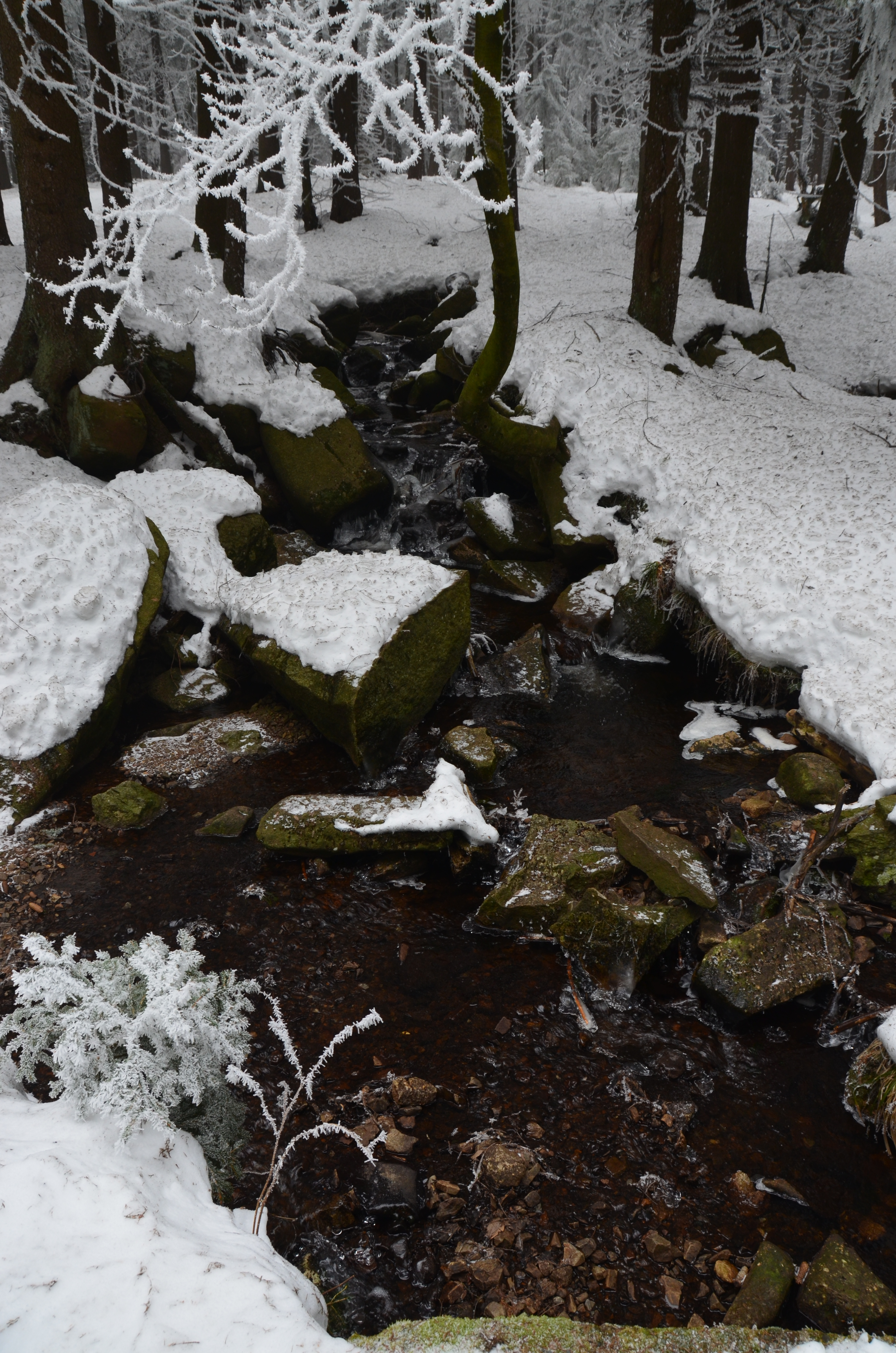

Location
- Country: Germany
- State: Saxony-Anhalt
- Location: Harz Mountains

Physical characteristics
- Source
  - location: above the Jakobsbruch
  - coordinates: 51°46′45″N 10°39′44″E
  - elevation: ca. 848 m
- Mouth
  - location: into the flood protection basin in the Kalte Bode
  - coordinates: 51°44′31″N 10°43′37″E
  - elevation: ca. 463 m
- Length: ca. 6.7 km (4.2 mi)
- Basin size: ca. 6.7 km^{2} (2.6 mi^{2})

Basin features
- Progression: Kalte Bode→ Bode→ Saale→ Elbe→ North Sea

The Wormke is a river of Saxony-Anhalt, Germany, in the Harz Mountains. It is a left tributary of the Kalte Bode, about 6.7 kilometres (4.2 mi) long.

== Course ==
The Wormke rises north of Schierke above the Jakobsbruch at about 848 metres (2,782 ft) above sea level in the Harz National Park and flows initially eastwards. After turning towards the southeast, it crosses the Glashüttenweg footpath on the Harzer Hexenstieg trail, where a weir diverts almost all its water into the Wormsgraben ditch. Next the Wormke is crossed by the tracks of the Brocken Railway, the Hagenstraße (L 100) road, on an embankment, and the tracks of the Harz Railway. Near Mandelholz (a part of Elend) the river finally discharges into the Kalte Bode, just above the Mandelholz Dam.

In its lower reaches was once a pond, the Mandelhölzer Teich (Wormke Reservoir), until the dam broke on 22 July 1855.

== See also ==
- List of rivers of Saxony-Anhalt
