= Königsburg =

Ruined medieval castle in Saxony-Anhalt, Germany

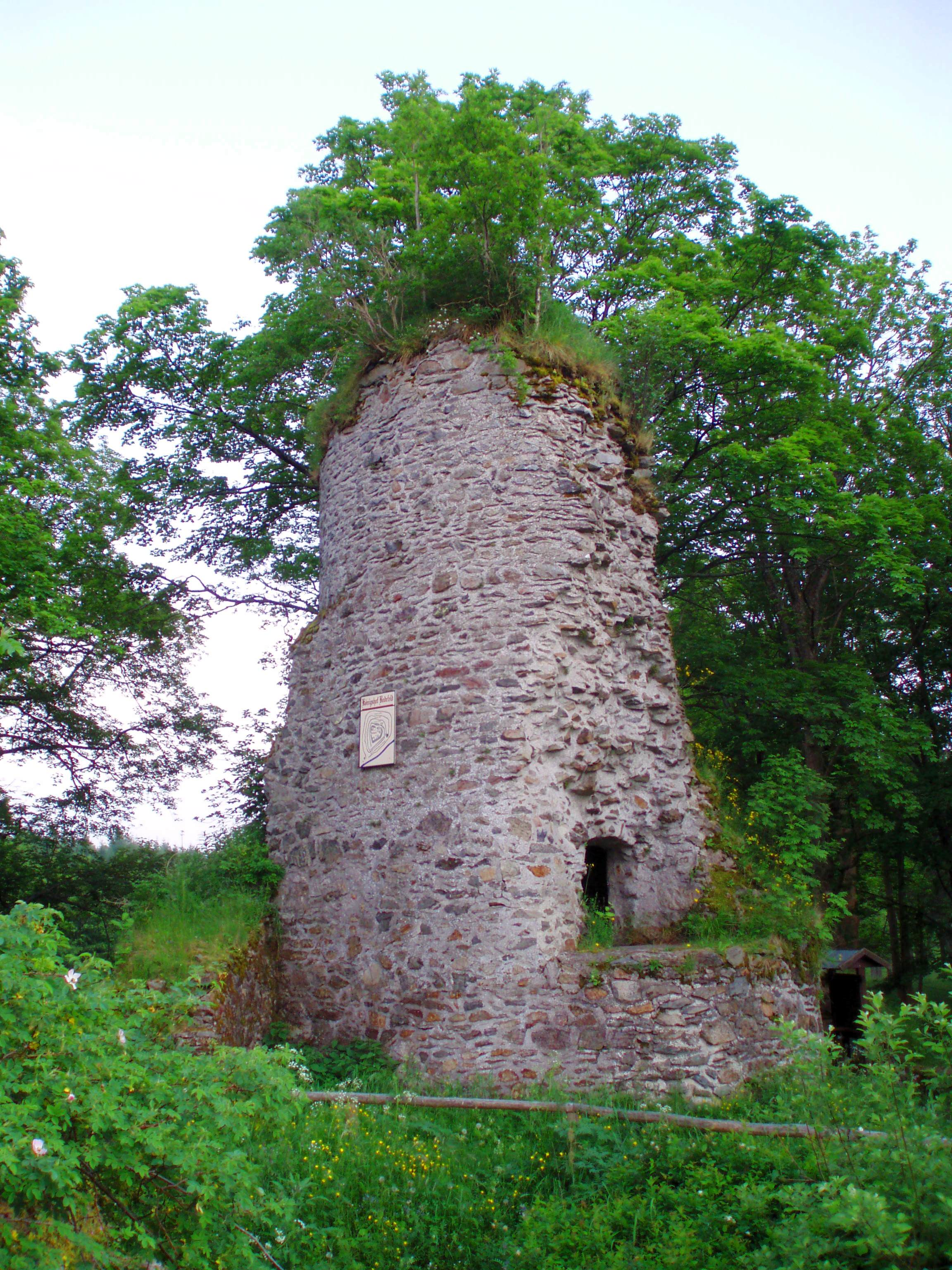
- The keep of Königsburg Castle

- Location within Saxony-Anhalt Königsburg (Germany)

General information
- Type: hill castle
- Classification: ruins
- Location: Königshütte
- Coordinates: 51°44.505′N 10°46.031′E
- Completed: first mentioned 1312

Height
- Height: 460 m above sea level (NN)

The Königsburg is a ruined medieval castle southeast of Königshütte, a village in the borough of Oberharz am Brocken, in Harz district in the German state of Saxony-Anhalt.

== Site ==
The ruins are located above the confluence of the Warme Bode and Kalte Bode rivers in the Harz Mountains in central Germany. They lie at a height of 460 metres above sea level on the edge of a wooded plateau and offer a good view of the Wurmberg and the Brocken, the highest mountains in Lower Saxony and the Harz respectively.

== History ==
In 1312 the site is first mentioned in the records as castrum Königshof when Bishop Albrecht von Halberstadt purchased the castle from Knappen Heinrich von Botvelde. In 1324 there is another mention of it as castrum Köningshof acqisivit, then all went quiet until it is described in 1709 for the first time as Königsburg. At that time it had already fallen into ruins.

When Paul Höfer carried out extensive excavations in the years from 1898 to 1901, he assumed he had discovered the long sought after palace (Pfalz) of Bodfeld and produced several publications about it.

In 1931, Carl Schuchhardt suggested, through advances in soil research, that this was incorrect and, a little later, this was confirmed by Paul Grimm, who was able to establish that the finds, especially the pottery, were not older than the 13th century. Although the results of this research from the 1930s have been consistently acknowledged within the scientific community, Königshütte still advertises today that the Königsburg is the Bodfeld hunting palace and one of the most significant historical sites in the Harz.

== Site and hiking ==
Only remnants of the bergfried and several ditches and ramparts bear witness to the former castle. The ruins of the Königsburg are incorporated as No. 41 into the system of the checkpoints in the Harzer Wandernadel.

== Gallery ==
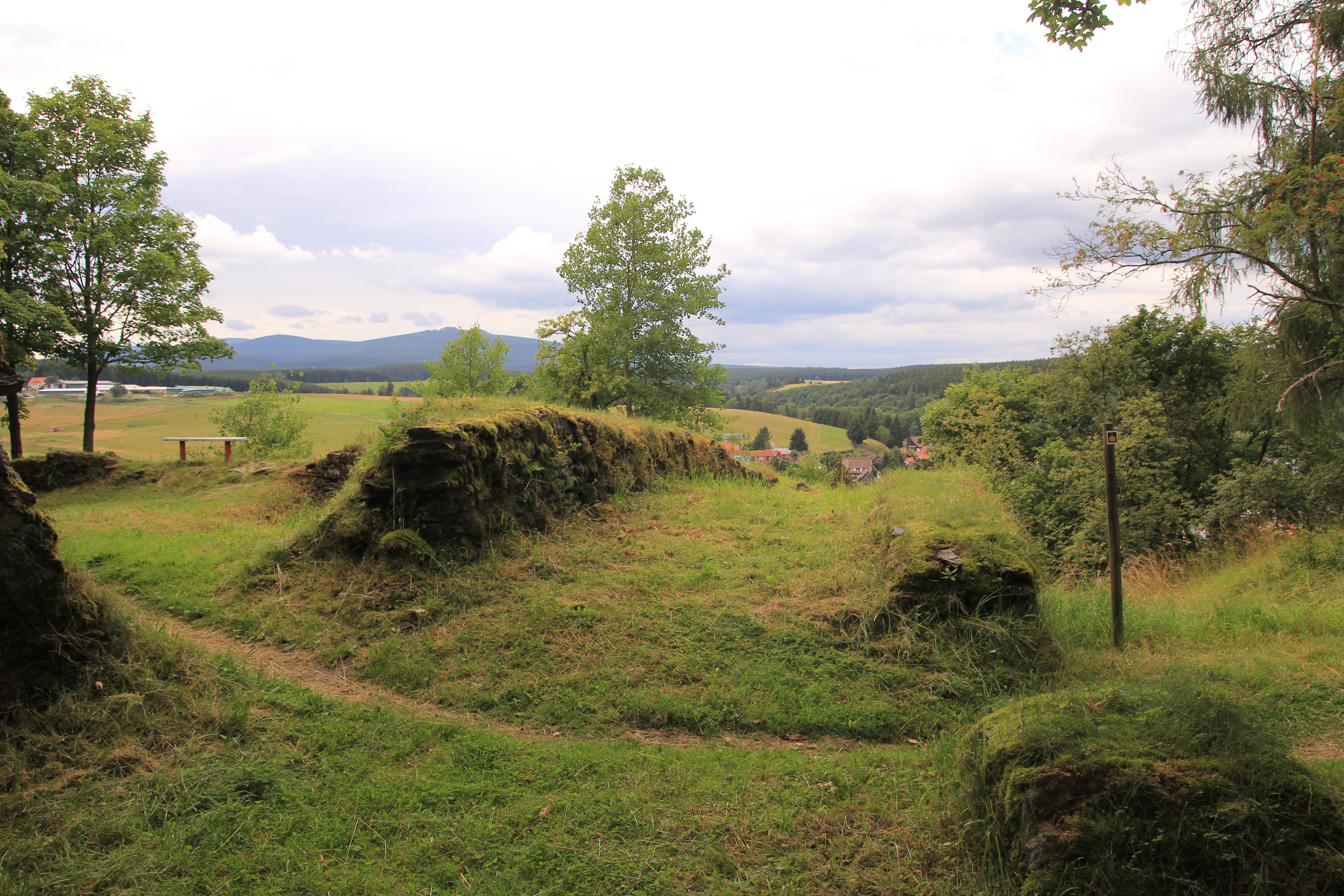
Foundation walls of the palas (left) and inner castle (right) with the Wurmberg behind

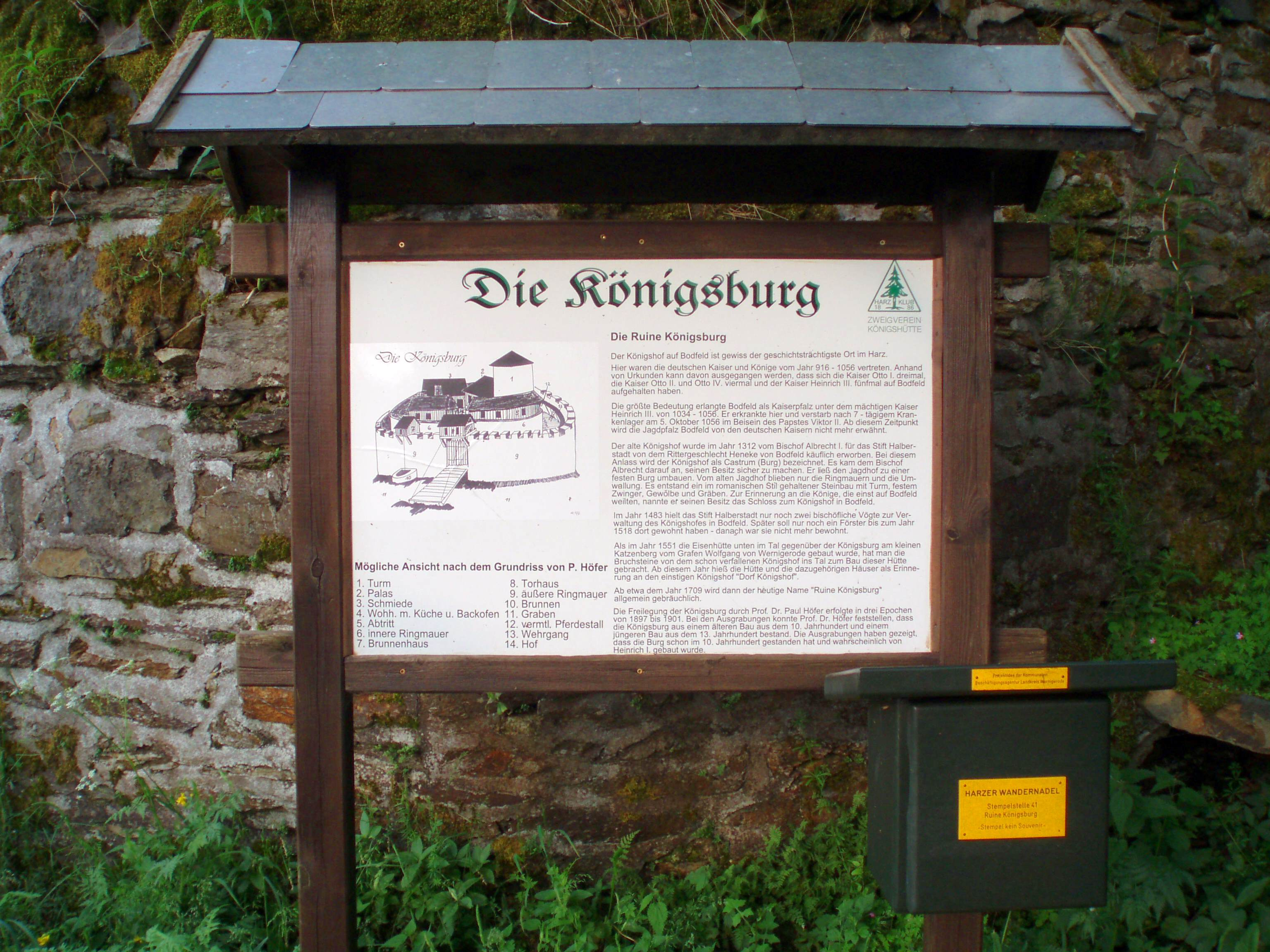
Information board by the castle ruins with checkpoint 41 of the Harzer Wandernadel: Ruine Königsburg

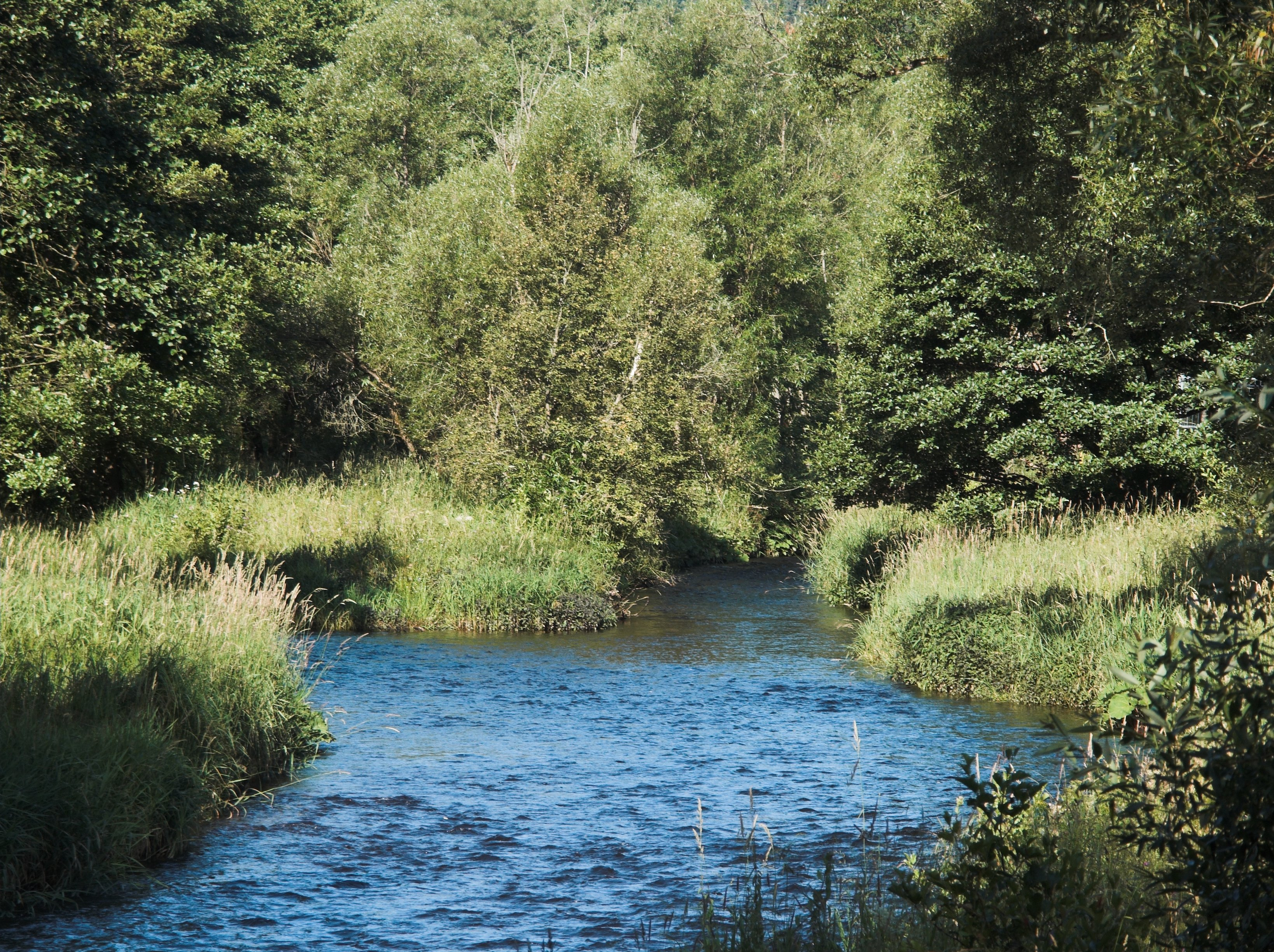
Confluence of the Warme Bode (left) and Kalte Bode (right) near Königshütte

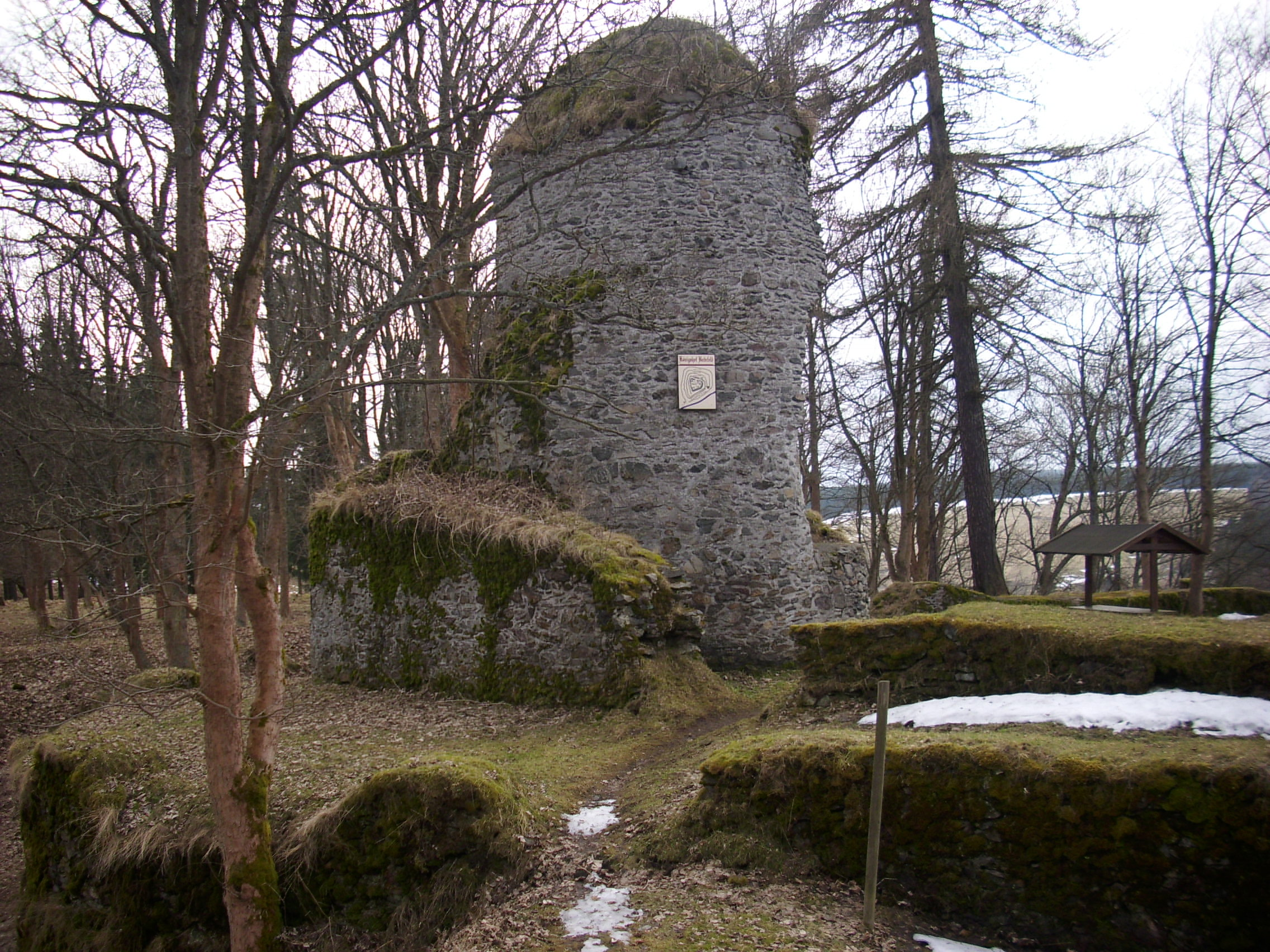

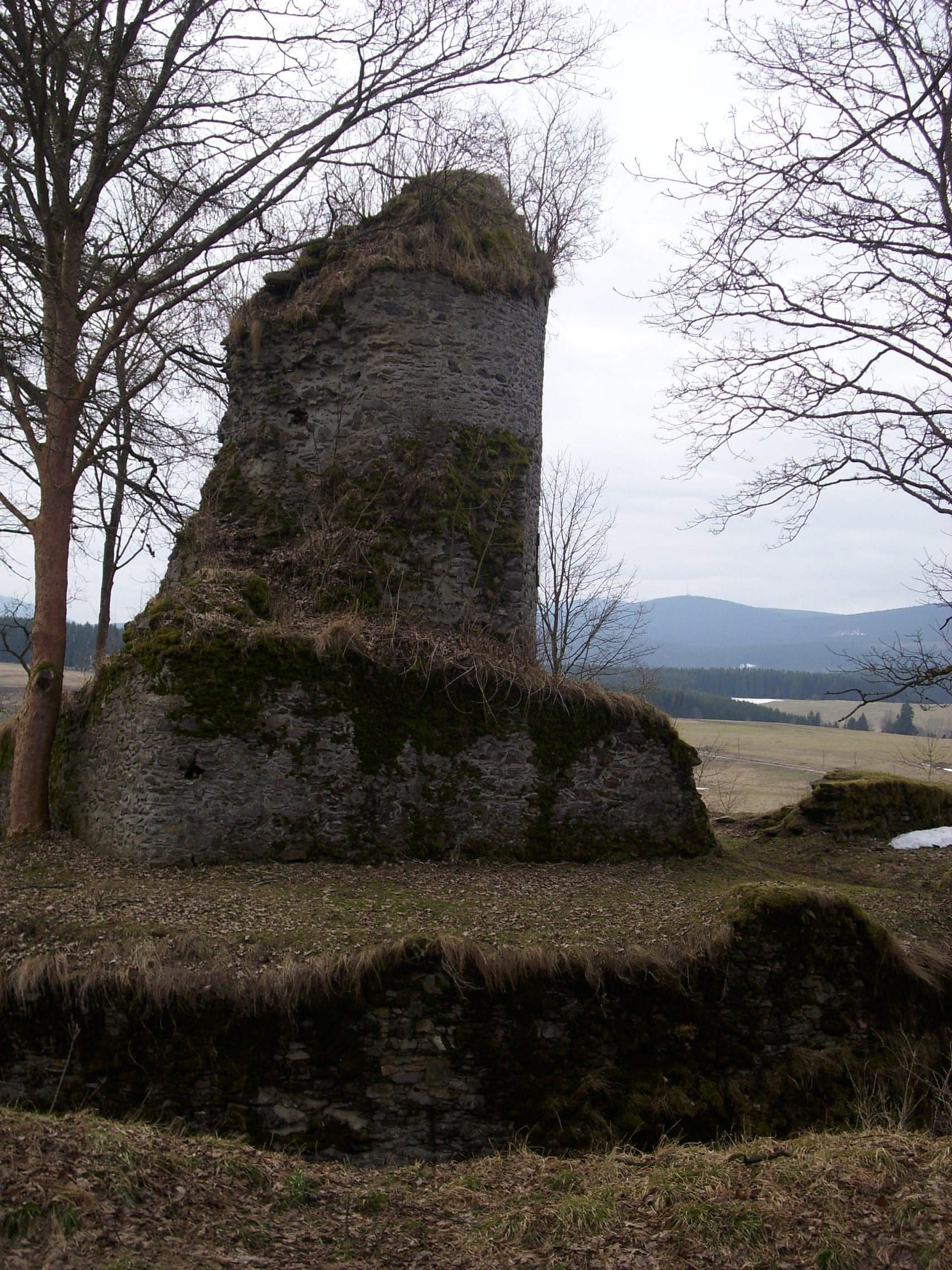

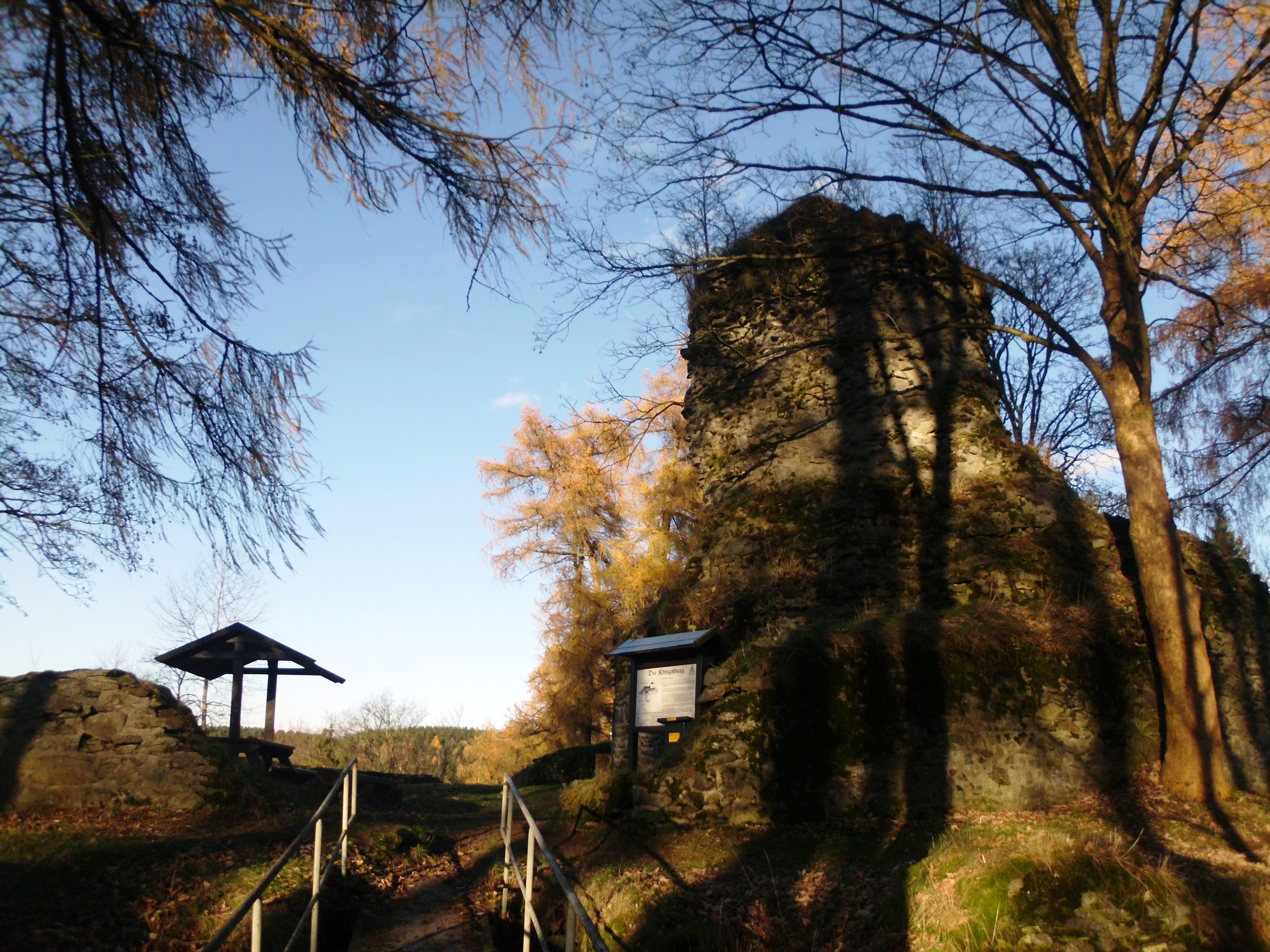

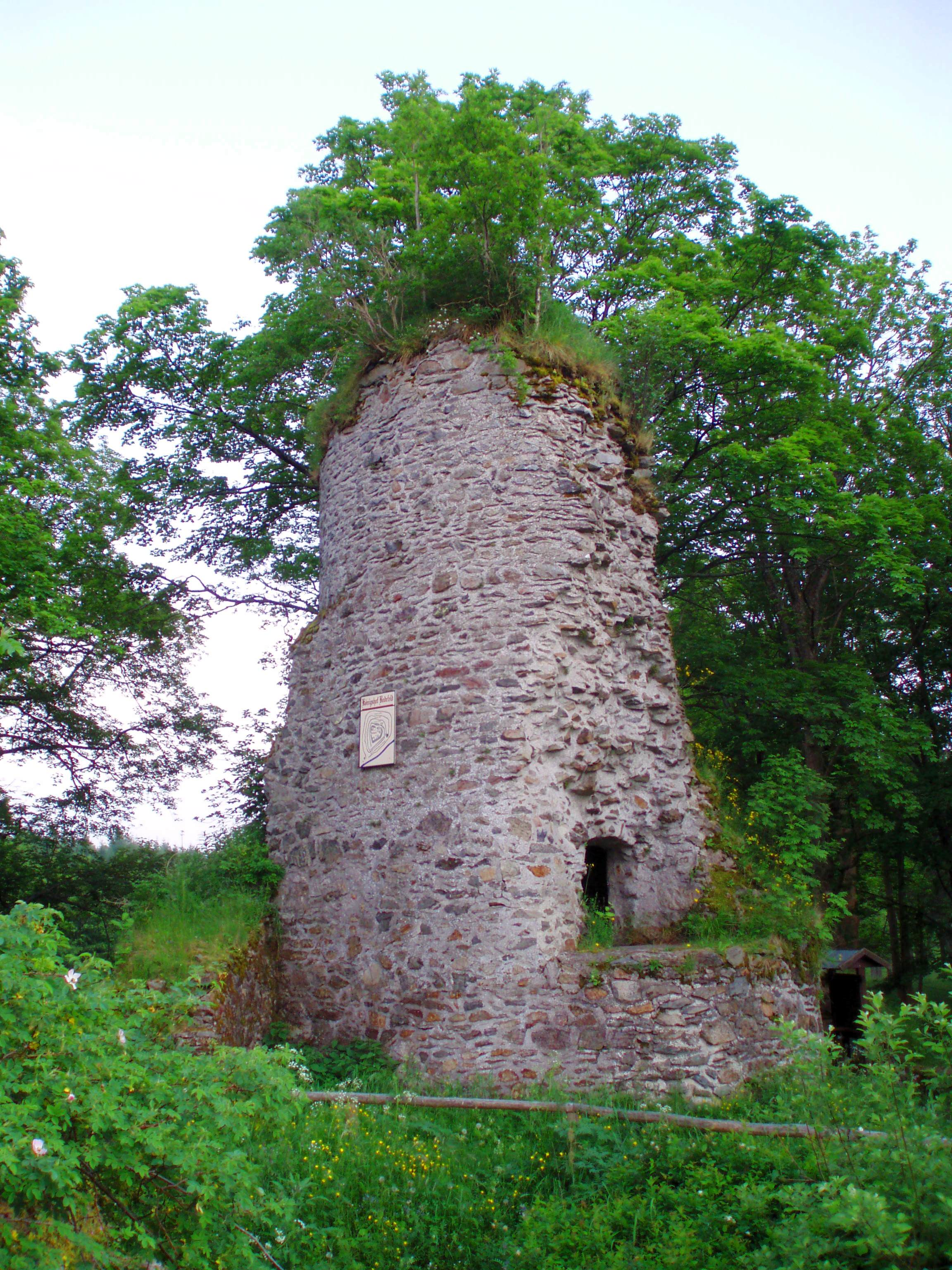

== See also ==
- List of castles in Saxony-Anhalt
