= Königshütte (Harz) =

Village in Harz, Germany

Coordinates: 51.74135°N 10.76616°E

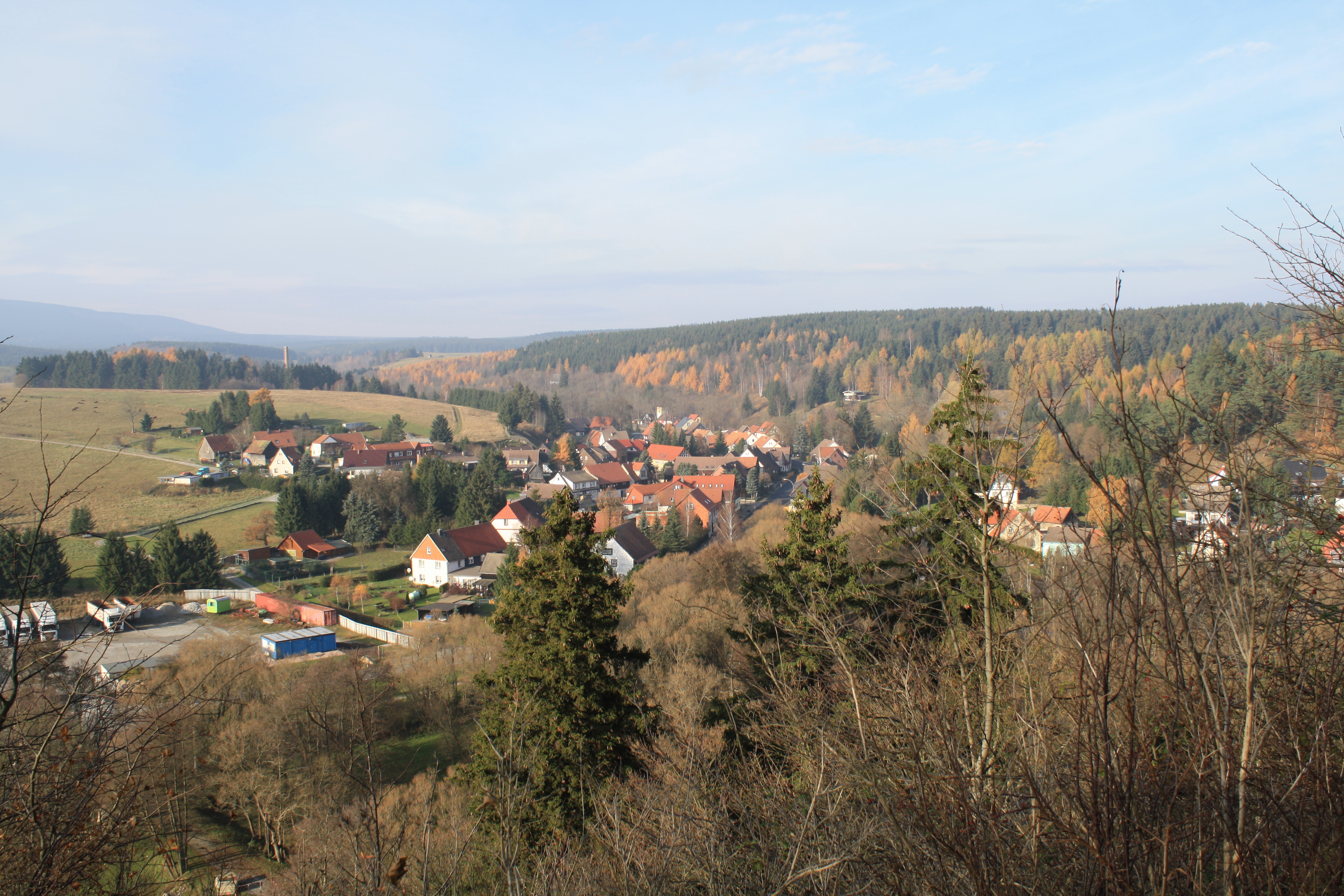
Königshütte from the ruins of Königsburg

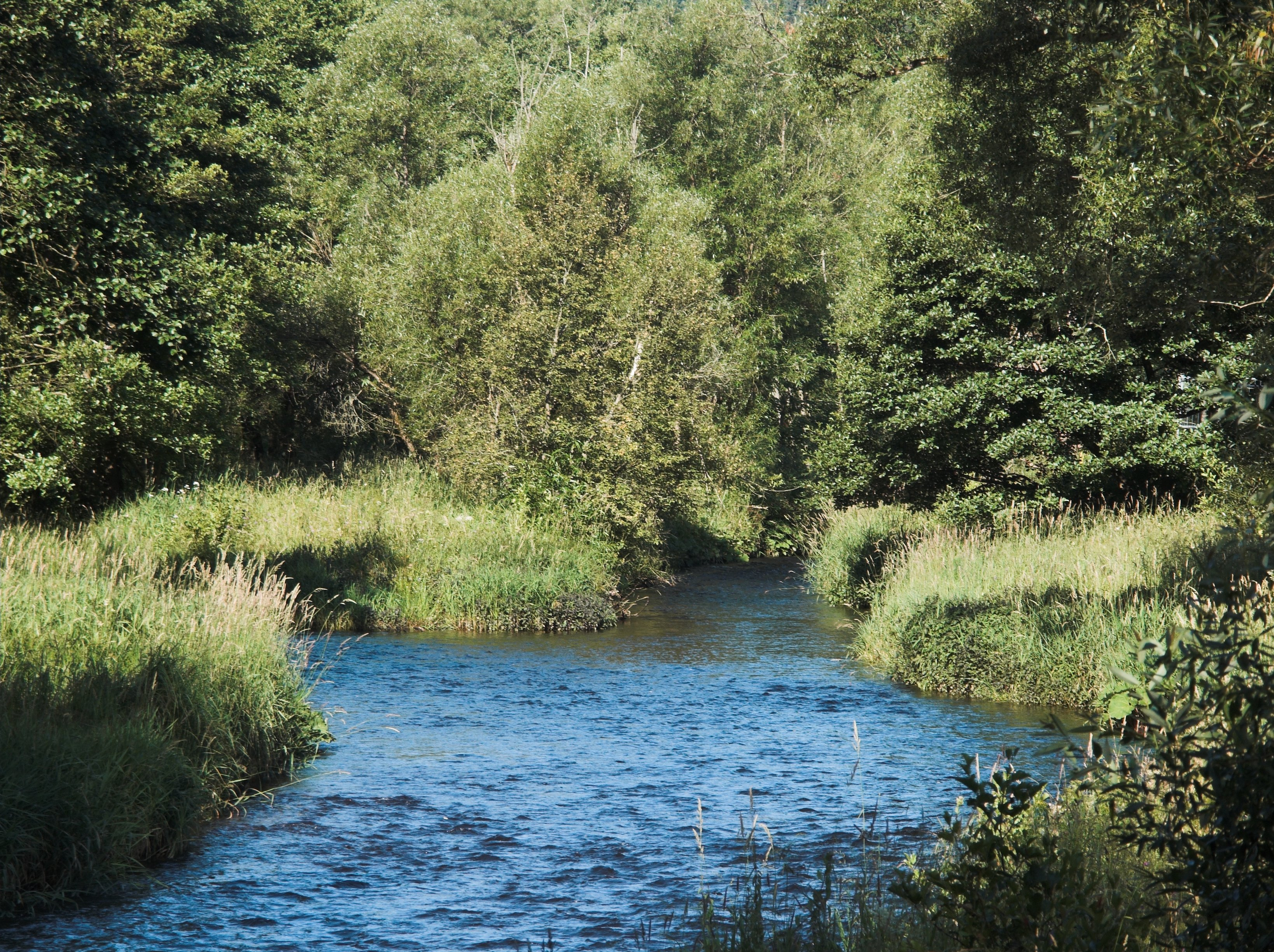
Confluence of the Warme (left) and the Kalte (right) Bode near Königshütte

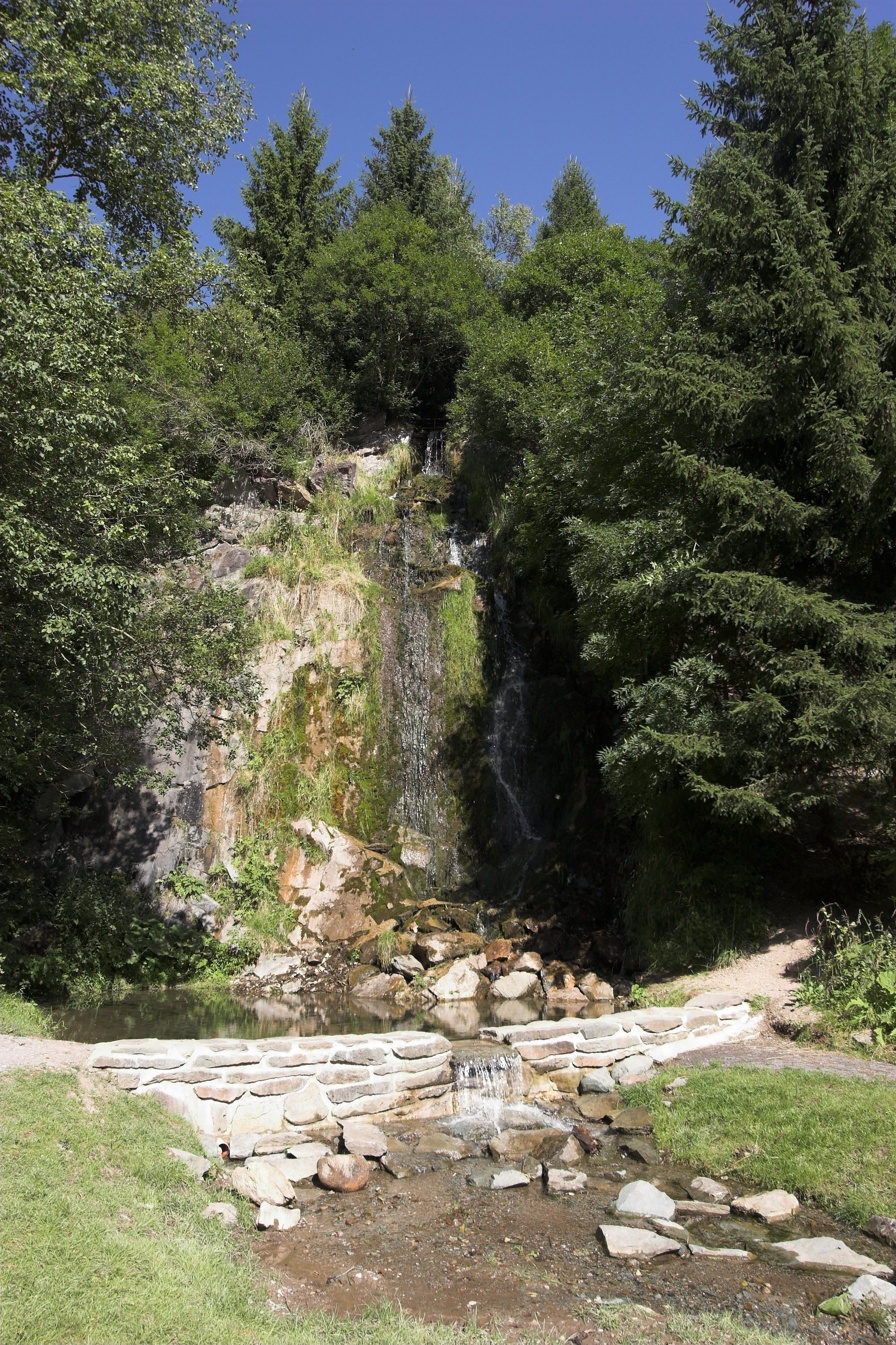
Königshütte Waterfall

Königshütte (German pronunciation: [ˈkøːnɪçsˌhʏtə]) is a German village in the district of Harz, in the state of Saxony-Anhalt. Since 1 January 2010 is a part of the municipality of Oberharz am Brocken. Its population is 452 (2021).

== Location ==
Königshütte lies on the B 27 federal road in the Harz mountains; a state road branching off to Tanne (Harz) in the centre of the village. Immediately below the settlement under the ruins of Königsburg castle is the confluence of the Kalte Bode and Warme Bode, which unite here to form the River Bode, which initially flows into the Königshütte Reservoir and then on towards Rübeland.

Königshütte is one of the waypoints on the Harzer Hexenstieg which runs past the site of the old Trogfurth Bridge.

== History ==
The once independent village emerged from the merger of Königshof and Rothehütte on 1 April 1936. Rothehütte was particularly known for being the home of several iron works such as the Neue Hütte and the Lüdershof.

Königshütte used to have a railway connexion to Blankenburg (Harz), but passenger services were withdrawn on the electrified section from Elbingerode–Königshütte on 30 May 1999 and the line was closed completely on 31 August 2000.

The hitherto independent municipality was incorporated into the town of Elbingerode on 1 January 2004, which became part of Oberharz am Brocken in 2010.

== Places of interest ==
- Heimatstube
- Königshütte Waterfall
- Bockberg nature reserve
- Königshütte Reservoir
- Mandelholz Reservoir
- Königsburg ruins
- Ruins of St Andrew's Church on a footpath towards Elbingerode
- The Ackertklippe crag with views to the Brocken

== Memorials ==
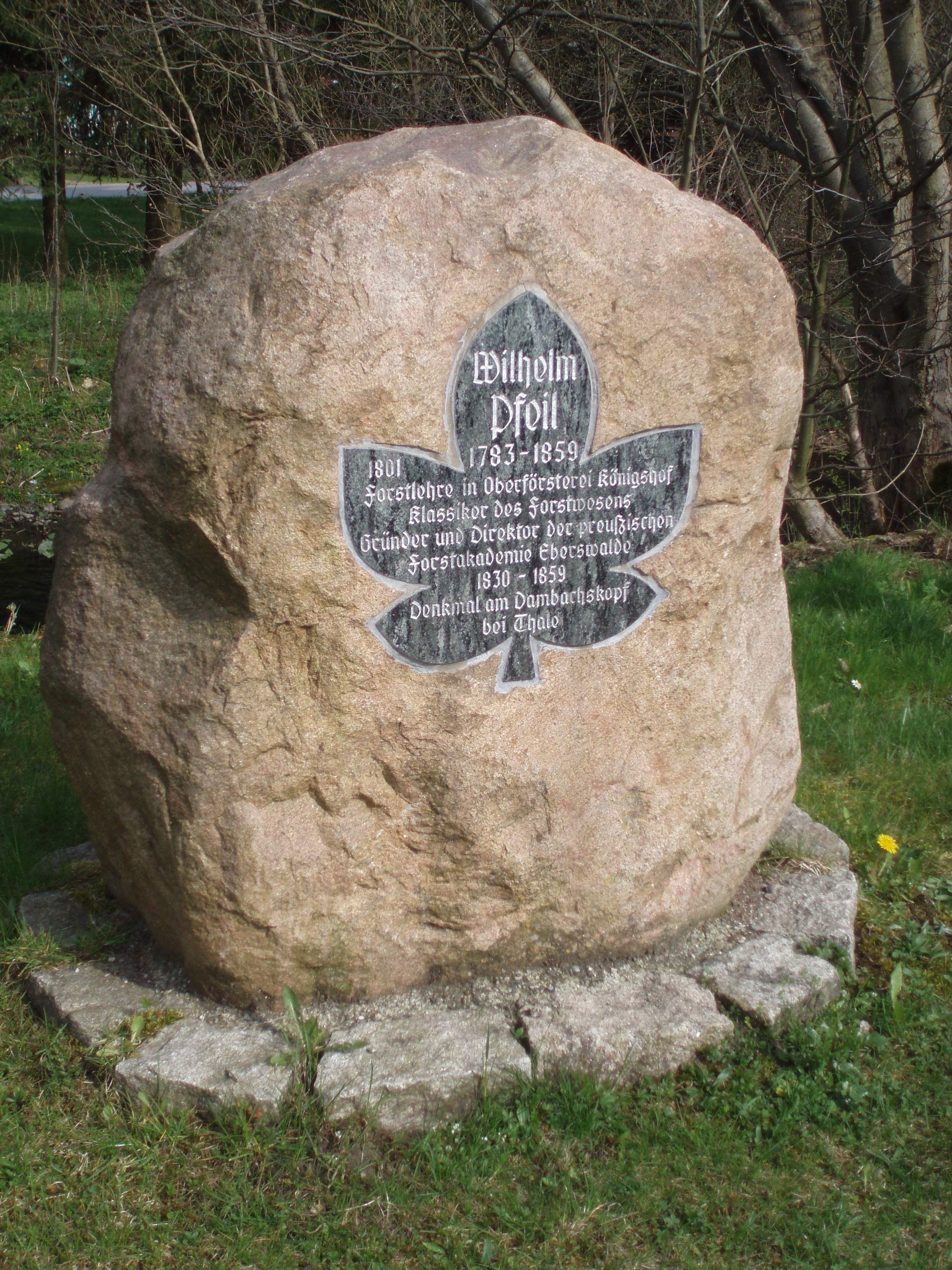
Pfeil memorial

- Memorial to the forestry scientist, Wilhelm Pfeil
- Graves in village cemetery (Ortsfriedhof) of two Soviet and one Dutch people, who were abducted during the Second World War, taken to Germany and were victims of forced labour.
