= Brocken-Hochharz =

Defunct district in northern Germany's Harz mountains

Coordinates: 51°41′N 10°51′E

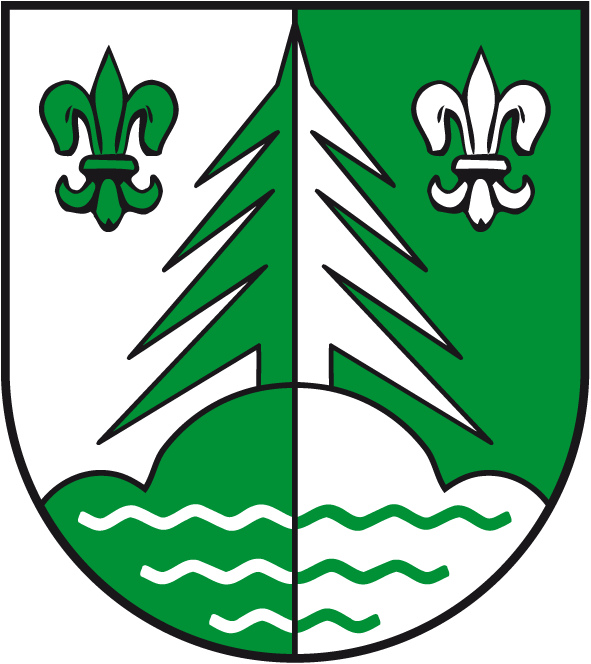
Coat of arms VG Brocken-Hochharz

Brocken-Hochharz (German pronunciation: [ˌbʁɔkŋ̍ˈhoːxhaːɐ̯ts]) was a Verwaltungsgemeinschaft ("collective municipality") in the district of Harz, in Saxony-Anhalt, Germany. It was situated in the Harz mountains, southwest of Wernigerode. It was named after the highest peak of the Harz: Brocken. The seat of the Verwaltungsgemeinschaft was in Hasselfelde. It was disbanded on 1 January 2010, when most member municipalities merged into the newly formed town of Oberharz am Brocken, with the exception of Allrode.

The Verwaltungsgemeinschaft Brocken-Hochharz consisted of the following municipalities:

1. Allrode
2. Benneckenstein
3. Elend
4. Hasselfelde
5. Sorge
6. Stiege
7. Tanne
