= Allerbach (Warme Bode) =

River in Germany

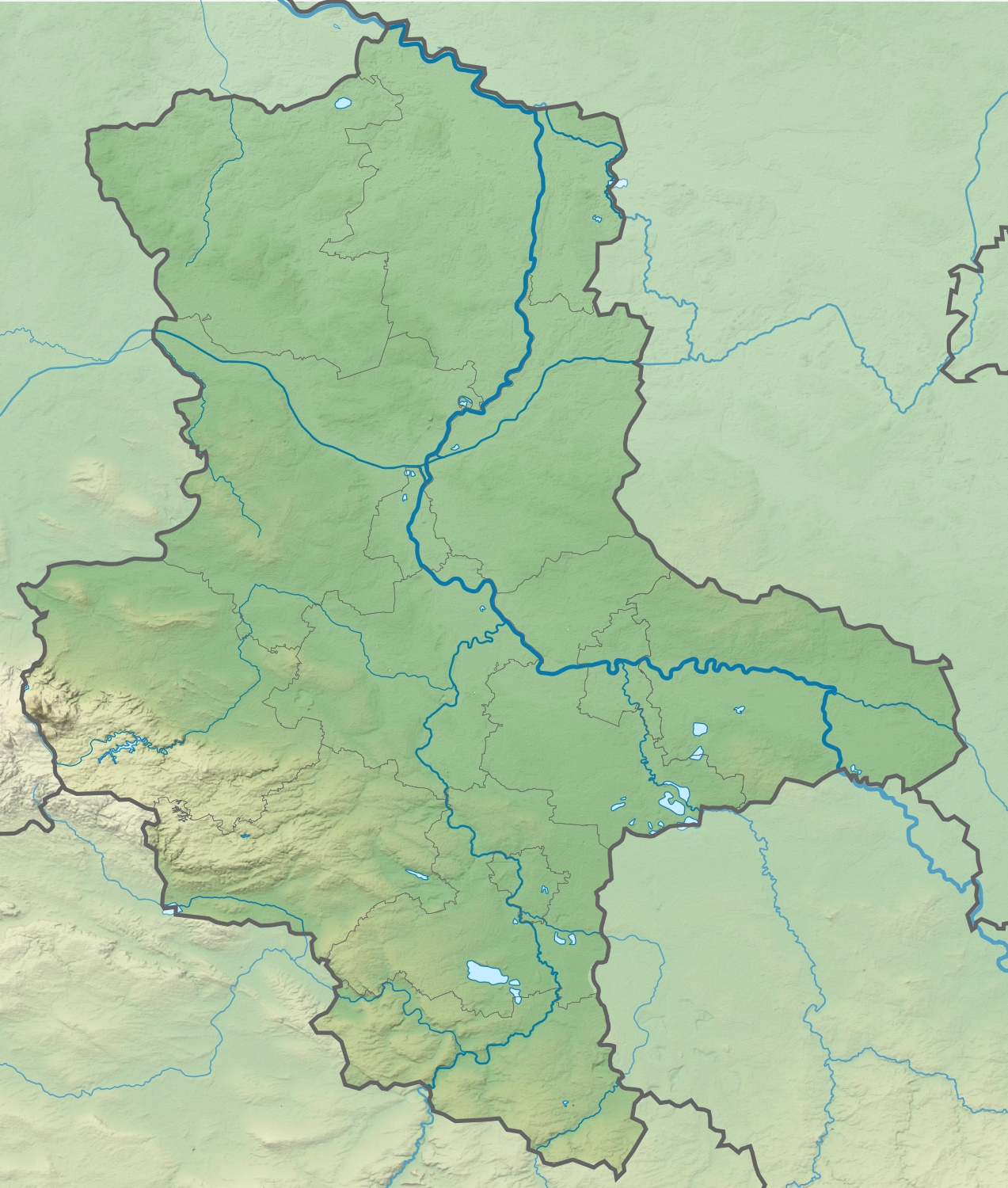
- Location of mouth in Saxony-Anhalt

Location
- Country: Germany
- Region: Harz
- State: Saxony-Anhalt

Physical characteristics
- Source
  - location: (see description)
  - coordinates: 51°43′32″N 10°40′56″E
  - elevation: ca. 560 m above sea level (NN)
- Mouth
  - location: (see description)
  - coordinates: 51°42′50″N 10°44′28″E
  - elevation: ca. 450 m above sea level (NN)
- Length: 5 km (3 mi)

Basin features
- Progression: Warme Bode→ Bode→ Saale→ Elbe→ North Sea
- Its entire course is part of the Harzer Bachläufe nature reserve.

The Allerbach is a tributary of the Warme Bode in the Harz Mountains of central Germany. It is just under 5 kilometres (3 mi) long.

The source region of the "Little Allerbach" (Kleiner Allerbach) is in a boggy wood at a height of 560 m above sea level (NN) and lies about 100 metres (330 ft) north of the level crossing on the K 1353 county road (Kreisstraße) (Sorge – Elend section) with the railway line of the Trans-Harz Railway.

The source region of the "Big Allerbach" (Großer Allerbach) is on the southwest hillside of the Rauher Jakob (560 m above NN); it lies at a height of 540 m above sea level (NN).

The stream flows downhill in an easterly direction.

With its confluence immediately next to the L 98 Landesstraße (Tanne – Königshütte section), the Allerbach forms the historic boundary of the Amt of Elbingerode. Even today there are numerous boundary stones left and right of the stream banks.

== See also ==
- List of rivers of Saxony-Anhalt
