= Elbingerode =

- Ortsteil of Oberharz am Brocken
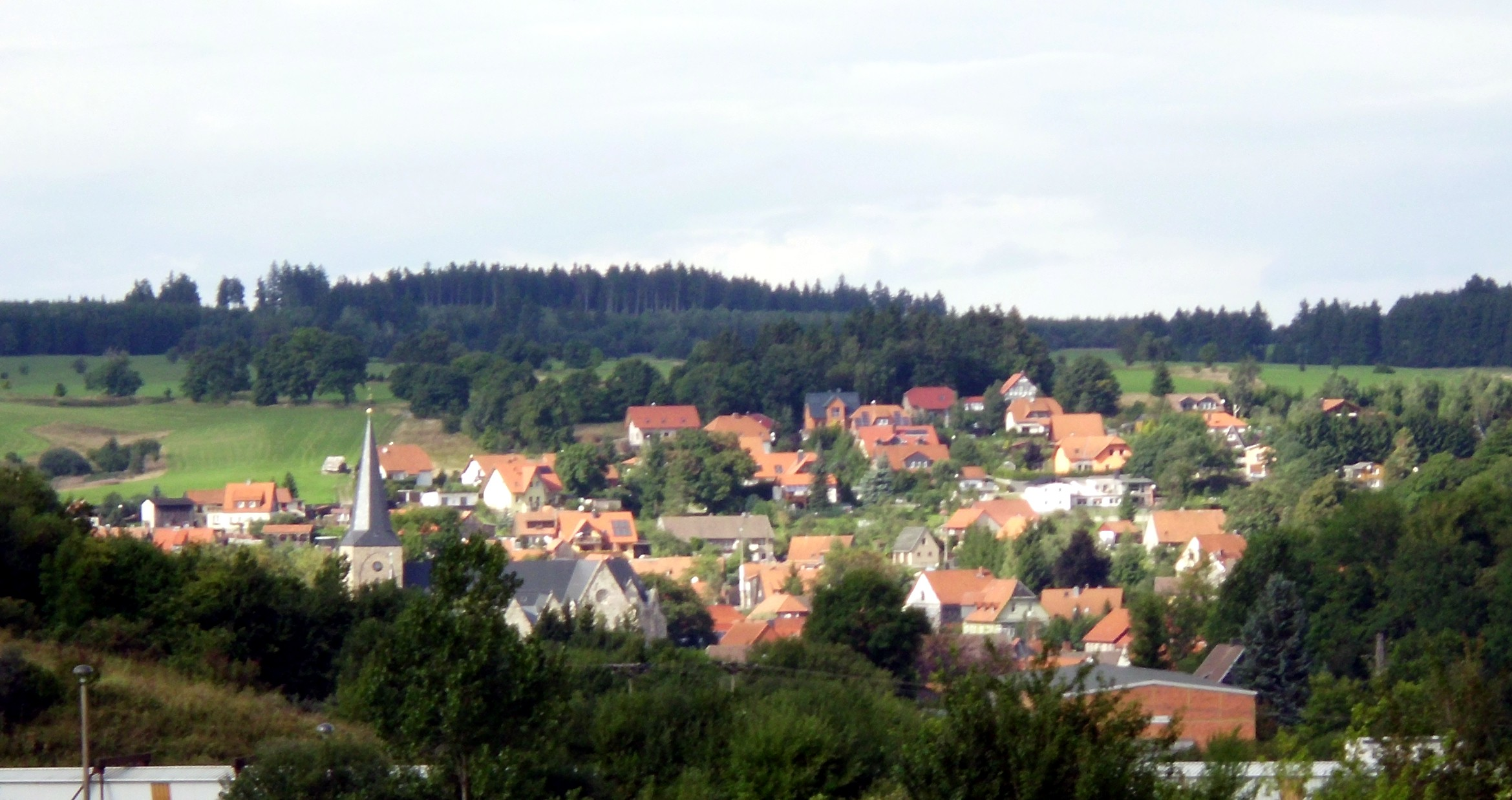

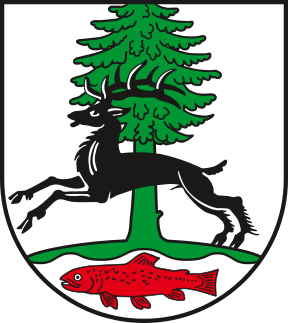
- Coat of arms

- Elbingerode within Oberharz am Brocken
- Interactive map of Elbingerode
- Location within Germany Location within Saxony-Anhalt
- Coordinates: 51°46′10″N 10°48′11″E
- Country: Germany
- State: Saxony-Anhalt
- District: Harz
- Town: Oberharz am Brocken

Area
  - Total: 80.74 km^{2} (31.17 sq mi)
- Elevation: 500 m (1,600 ft)

Population (2021-12-31)
  - Total: 3,101
  - Density: 38.41/km^{2} (99.47/sq mi)
- Time zone: UTC+01:00 (CET)
  - Summer (DST): UTC+02:00 (CEST)
- Postal codes: 38875
- Dialling codes: 039454
- Website: stadtoberharz.de

Elbingerode (German pronunciation: [ɛlbɪŋəˈʁoːdə]) is an Ortsteil of Oberharz am Brocken in the Harz district, in the German state of Saxony-Anhalt. The former town was incorporated into the newly established municipality on 1 January 2010. Its population is 3,101 (2021).

== Geography ==
Elbingerode is situated in the eastern Harz mountain range, approximately 8 km (5.0 mi) south of neighbouring Wernigerode. The former municipal area comprised Elbingerode proper as well as the villages of Königshütte and Rübeland. The surrounding mountains were the site of numerous ore mines and ironworks, today the Drei Kronen & Ehrt mine and the Büchenberg Pit, run as show mines, are popular tourist destinations.

Cargo train service to several surrounding limestone pits is provided on the standard gauge Rübeland Railway link to Blankenburg, opened in 1886; the former continuation to Drei Annen Hohne station and the Harz Railway line was closed in 1965.

There is a large open-cast limestone mine, the Tagebau Felswerke, on the edge of the town. From checkpoint 39 on the Harzer Wandernadel hiking network, there is a good view over the mine.

== History ==
The lands around Elbingerode had been a feudal hunting ground since the Middle Ages, when it was part of the Harzgau territory within the Duchy of Saxony. King Henry the Fowler stayed several times at Bodfeld, a royal hunting lodge or Königspfalz, demonstrably in 935, as did his successors of the Ottonian and Salian dynasty. In 1056 Emperor Henry III died here on 5 October 1056 on a hunting excursion with Pope Victor II.

The settlement itself was first mentioned as Alvelingeroth in a 1206 deed, when Pope Innocent III granted the estates to the canonesses of Gandersheim Abbey. In 1422 Abbess Agnes of Brunswick ceded Elbingerode to her father, the Welf duke Eric I of Brunswick-Grubenhagen, who vested Count Bodo VII of Stolberg with the Elbingerode mines and Wildbannforst hunting grounds five years later. Nevertheless, Bodo chose to give the remote estates in pawn to his brothers-in-law, the Counts of Schwarzburg, in 1438. His descendants, deep in debt, were not able to redeem the pledge.

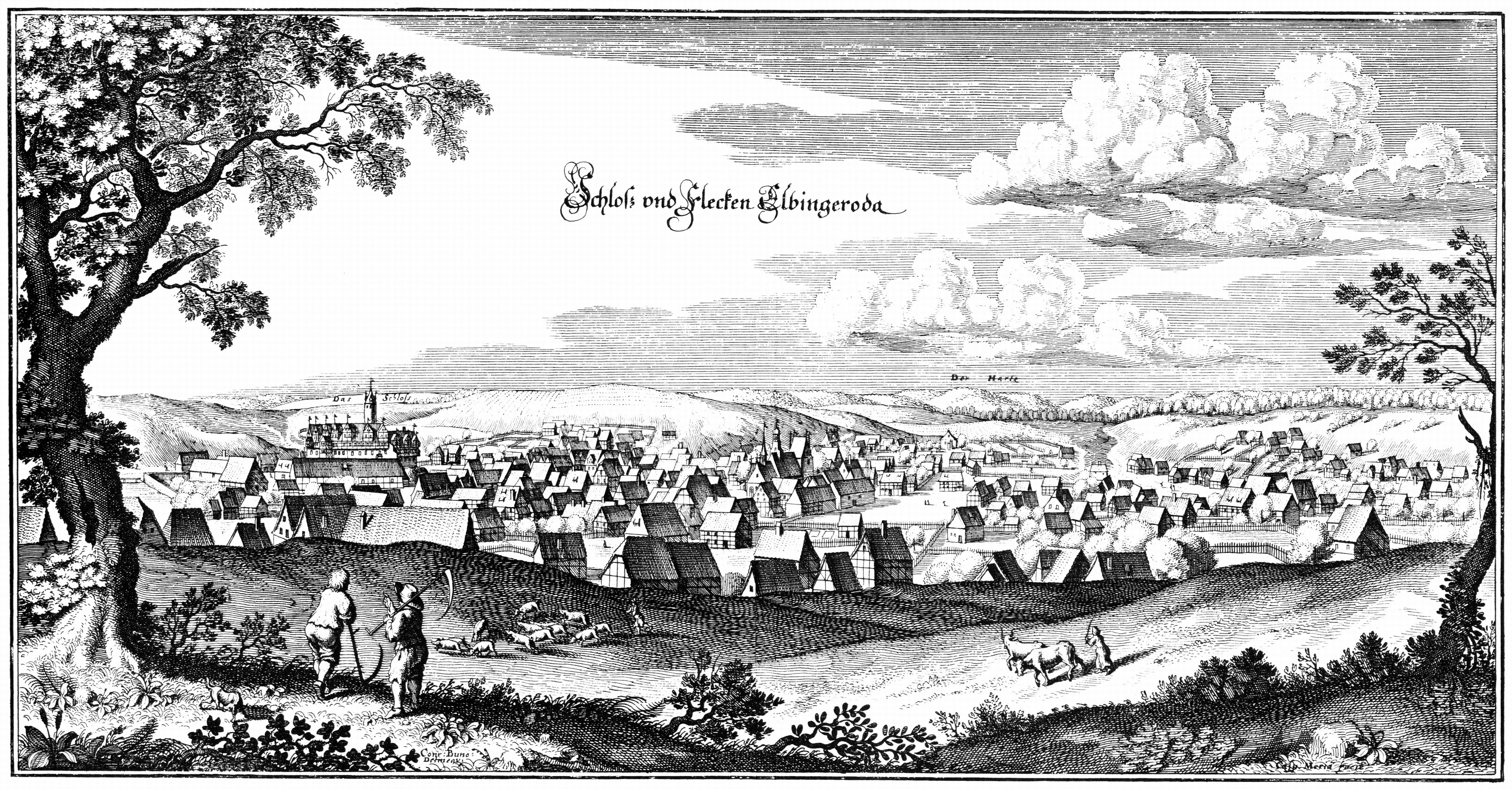
Elbingerode, engraving by Matthäus Merian (about 1650)

Finally in 1564, the Brunswick dukes of Calenberg seized the fief and granted town privileges to the citizens of Elbingerode, which became the seat of a local Amt administration. The Stolberg counts had vainly attempted to regain the estates; their claims were finally rejected by Duke George of Brunswick-Calenberg in 1635. With the Calenberg principality, Elbingerode became part of the newly established Electorate of Hanover in 1705. Temporarily part of the Napoleonic Kingdom of Westphalia, the Amt passed to the Welf Kingdom of Hanover in 1814. Annexed by Prussia after the Austro-Prussian War of 1866, it was incorporated into the Province of Hanover.

In 1932 Elbingerode passed to the Ilfeld district in the Prussian Province of Saxony; it became part of the Soviet occupation zone and East Germany after World War II. In 2010, Elbingerode, with Rübeland and Königshütte, merged with the neighbouring towns of Benneckenstein and Hasselfelde as well as the municipalities of Elend, Sorge, Stiege, and Tanne into the town of Oberharz am Brocken.

== Notable people ==
- Andreas Werckmeister (1645–1706), organist and music theorist, worked in Elbingerode from 1674 to 1696
- Paul Ernst (1866–1933), author
- Norbert Hahn (born 1954), luger

== International relations ==
Elbingerode is twinned with:

- Altenau, Germany
- Chambourcy, France
- Elbingerode, Lower Saxony, Germany
- Gehrden, Germany
- Hoheneggelsen, Söhlde, Germany
- Purhus, Denmark
- Velké Opatovice, Blansko District, Czech Republic
