= Rauher Jakob =

Rauher Jacob
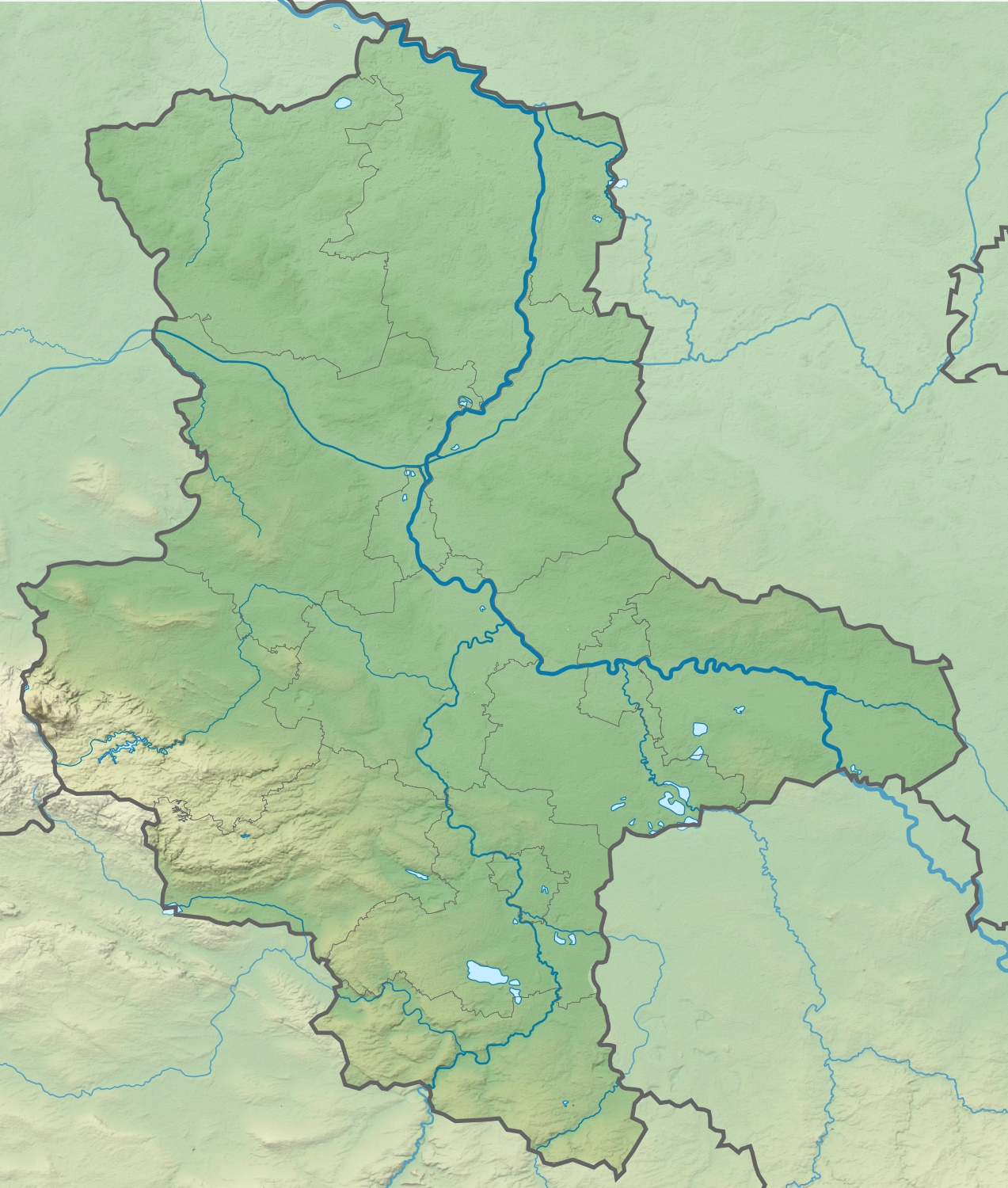
- Location within Saxony-Anhalt

Highest point
- Elevation: 568.6 m above sea level (NN) (1,865 ft)
- Coordinates: 51°43′25″N 10°42′11″E

Geography
- Location: Harz county, Saxony-Anhalt, Germany
- Parent range: Harz Mountains

The Rauher Jakob (literally "Rough James") is a hilltop between Tanne and Elend in the Harz mountains of central Germany. It is 568.6 metres above sea level. In the vicinity are the sources of the Spielbach and Allerbach, two tributary streams of the Warme Bode. The Ramsenhöhe is a sub-peak of the Rauher Jakob with a height of 565 metres AMSL.
