= Kapitelsberg =

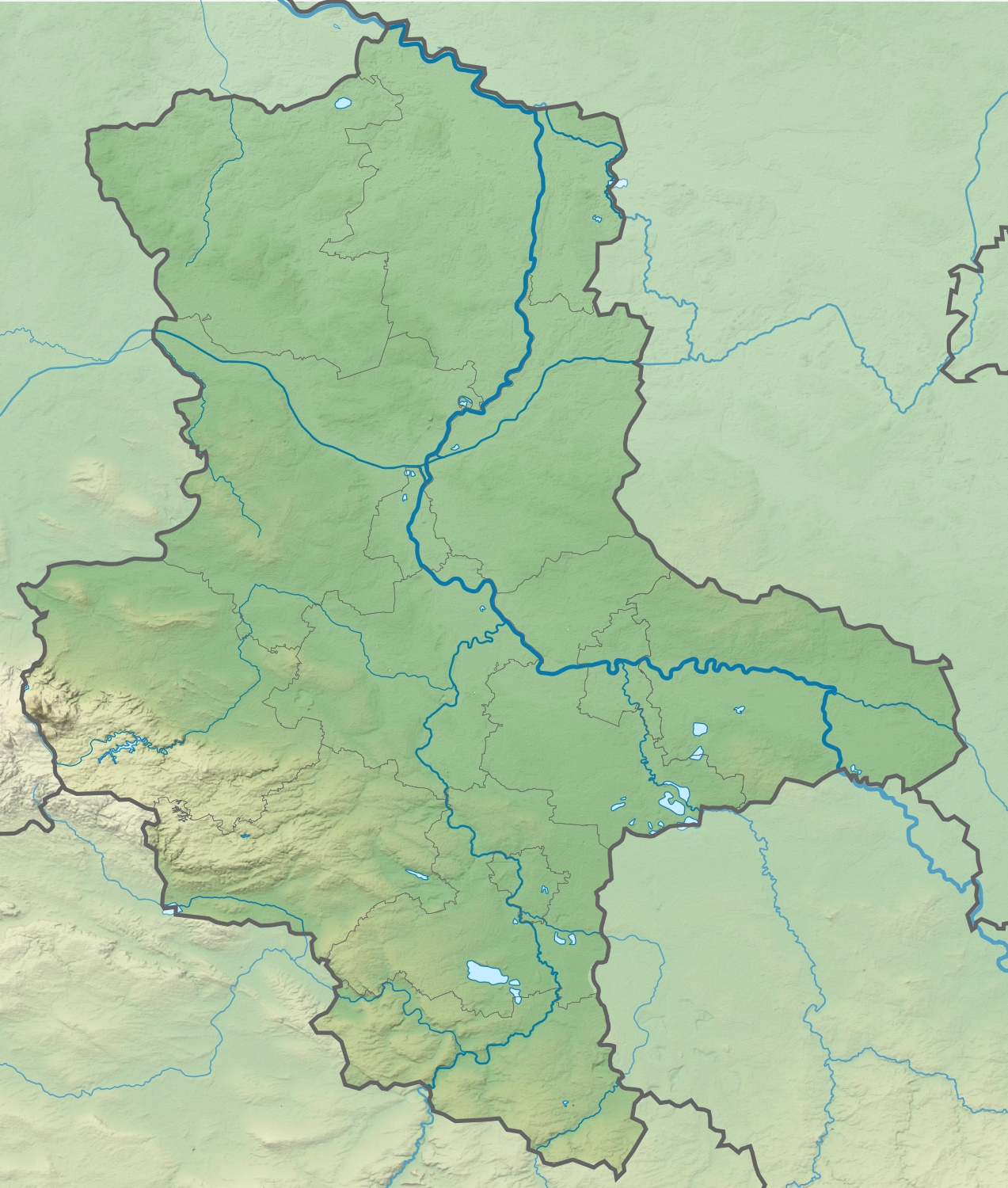
- Location within Saxony-Anhalt

Highest point
- Elevation: 535.7 m above sea level (NN) (1,758 ft)
- Coordinates: 51°42′18″N 10°45′05″E

Geography
- Location: Harz county, Saxony-Anhalt, Germany
- Parent range: Harz (Lower Harz)

The Kapitelsberg in the Harz Mountains of Germany is a hill, 535.7 m above sea level (NN), near the village of Tanne in the county of Harz, Saxony-Anhalt.

== Location ==
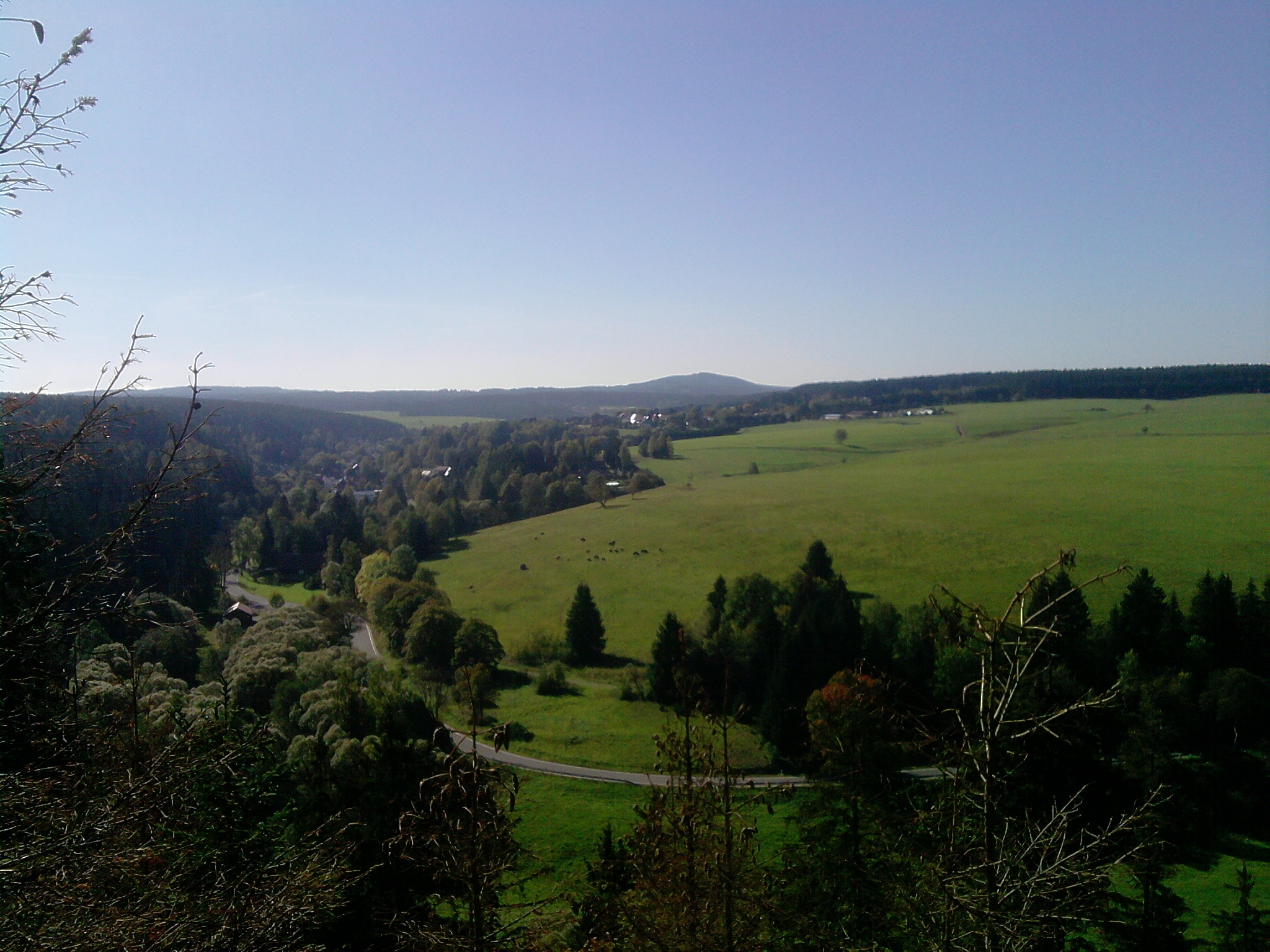
View of Tanne in the valley of the Warm Bode from an observation point on the Kapitelsberg (see also left photo)

The Kapitelsberg lies in the Lower Harz within the Harz/Saxony-Anhalt Nature Park. It rises about 2 km east-northeast of the village of Tanne in the borough of Oberharz am Brocken. Its forested hillsides drop away to the west and north into the valley of the Warm Bode, into which the Allerbach stream empties at the northwestern foot of the hill. To the east it descends into the valley of another stream, also called the Allerbach, which is a tributary of the Rappbode. The valleys surrounding the hill are part of the Harzer Bachtäler nature reserve.

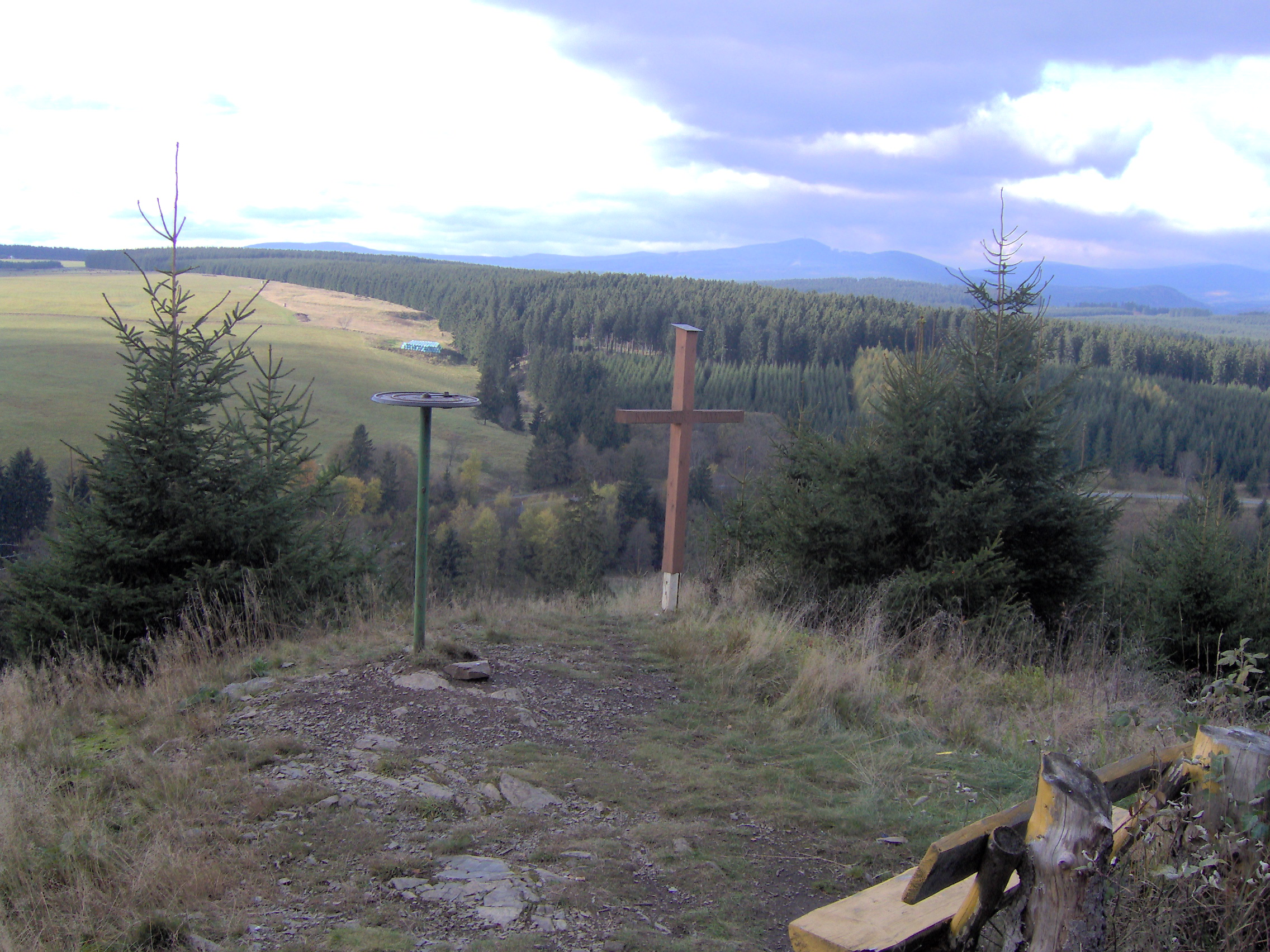
A viewing point (ca. 528 m above NN; about 750 metres west of the summit) on the Kapitelsberg (see also right photo); with the Wurmberg (centre) and Brocken (right)

== Views and hiking ==
The Kapitelsberg can only be reached over forest tracks and hiking trails. About 750 metres west of the summit there is a viewing point (ca. 528 m above NN; 51°42′20.65″N 10°44′24.2″E). Here is a wooden cross and an iron toposcope on which, in addition to the four main points of the compass, several geographical destinations in the surrounding area are indicated. From here the view extends over the village of Tanne in the valley of the Warm Bode, to the mountains of Hohnekamm, Wurmberg and Brocken as well as the Achtermannshöhe.

A little east of the observation point near a picnic area there is a refuge hut (51°42′20.25″N 10°44′27.5″E) with checkpoint 44 in the Harzer Wandernadel hiking network.
