= Elend, Saxony-Anhalt =

Elend
- Stadtteil of Oberharz am Brocken
- Interactive map of Elend
- Location within Germany Location within Saxony-Anhalt
- Coordinates: 51°44′41″N 10°41′10″E
- Country: Germany
- State: Saxony-Anhalt
- District: Harz
- Town: Oberharz am Brocken

Area
  - Total: 27.39 km^{2} (10.58 sq mi)
- Elevation: 490 m (1,610 ft)

Population (2021-12-31)
  - Total: 318
  - Density: 11.6/km^{2} (30.1/sq mi)
- Time zone: UTC+01:00 (CET)
  - Summer (DST): UTC+02:00 (CEST)
- Postal codes: 38875
- Dialling codes: 039455
- Vehicle registration: HZ
- Website: stadtoberharz.de

Elend (German pronunciation: [ˈeːlɛnt]) is a district of the town of Oberharz am Brocken in the Harz District, in Saxony-Anhalt, Germany. It lies in the Bode valley in the High Harz in central Germany, at a height of 505 m above NN. This part of the valley is known locally as Elendstal. Elend is located near the former Inner German Border between West and East Germany. Its population is 318 (2021).

== Geography ==
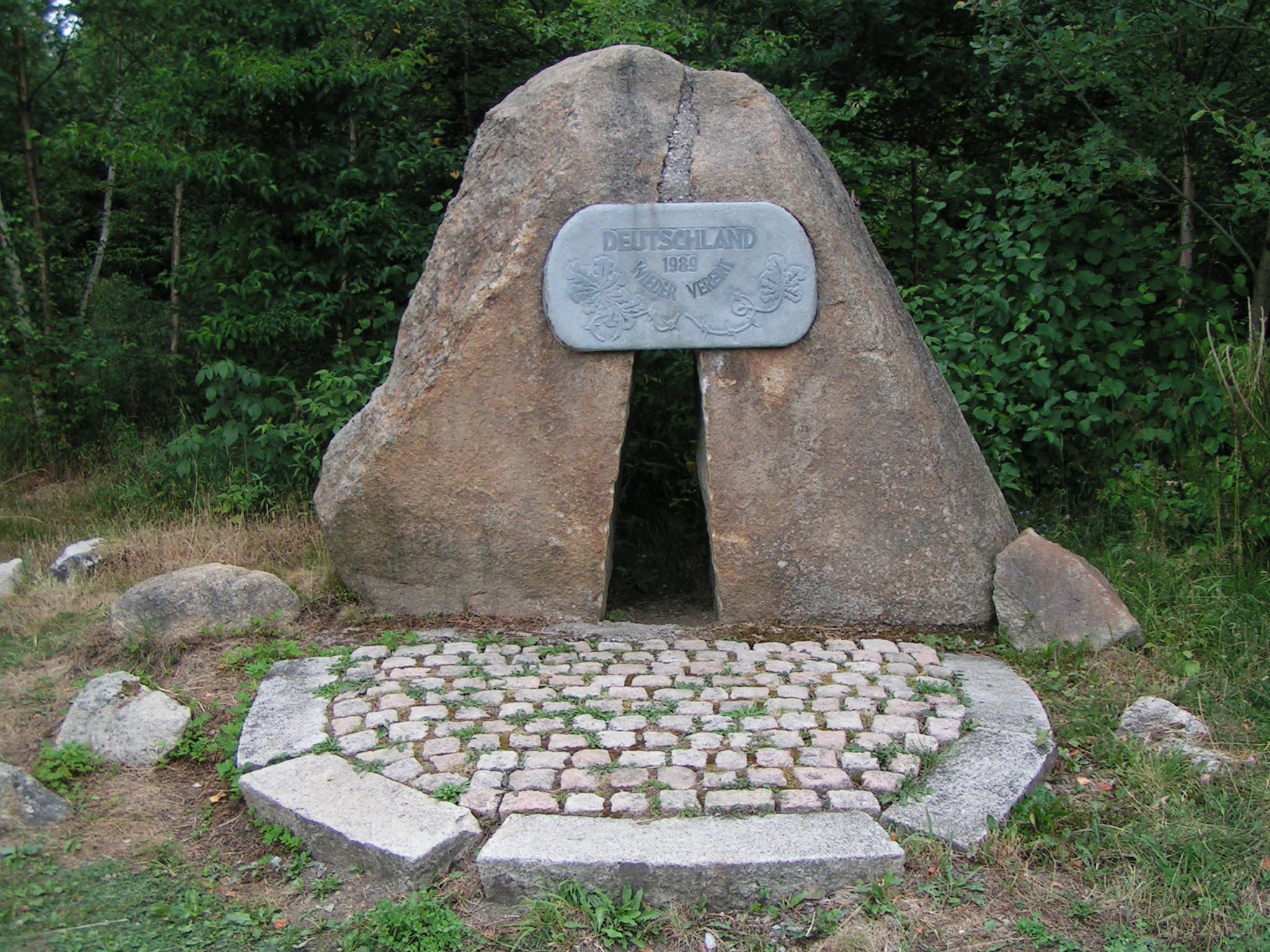
Monument of the Division of Germany and Reunification on the Inner German Border immediately next to the B 27 federal road between Elend and Braunlage

About 3 kilometres west of the village is the nature reserve of Kramershai.

=== Climate ===
The annual precipitation in Elend is 1,116 mm (43.9 in.) which is in the upper third of the values recorded by the weather stations of the German Meteorological Office. Over 90% have lower values. The driest month is September; the wettest is December, when about 2.1 times as much rain falls as in the driest month. The average annual variations in precipitation lie in the upper third. In over 91% of all locations the monthly precipitation varies less than in Elend.

== History ==
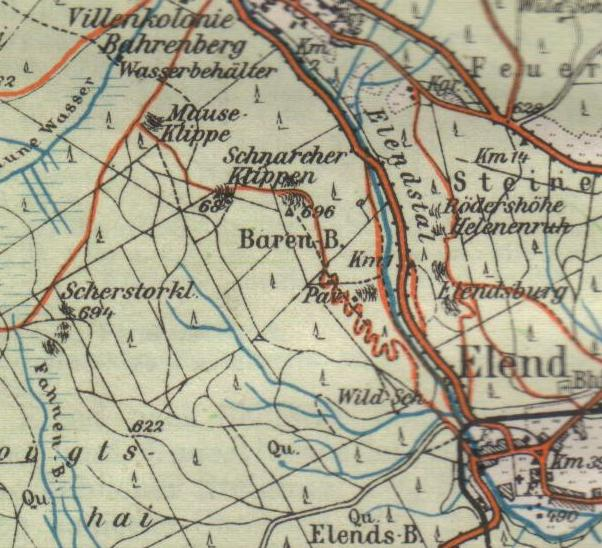
1912 map of the region between Schierke and Elend

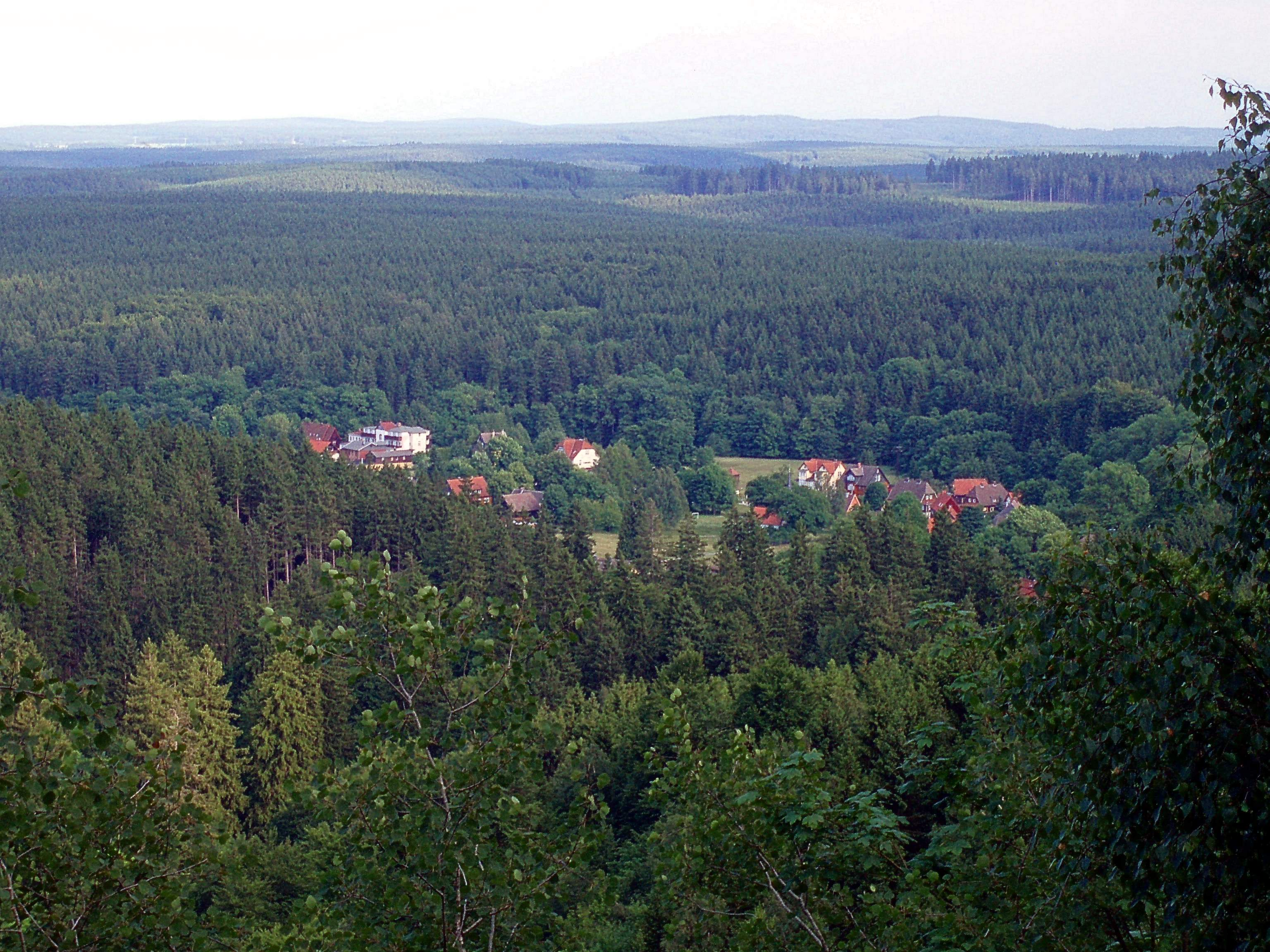
View of Elend

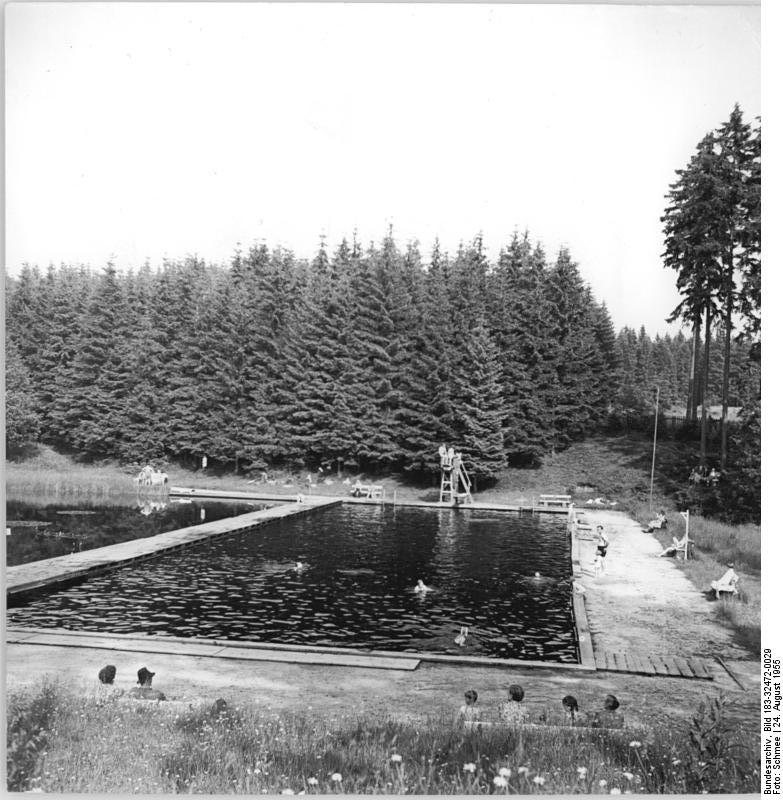
Woodland open-air pool in Elend in 1955

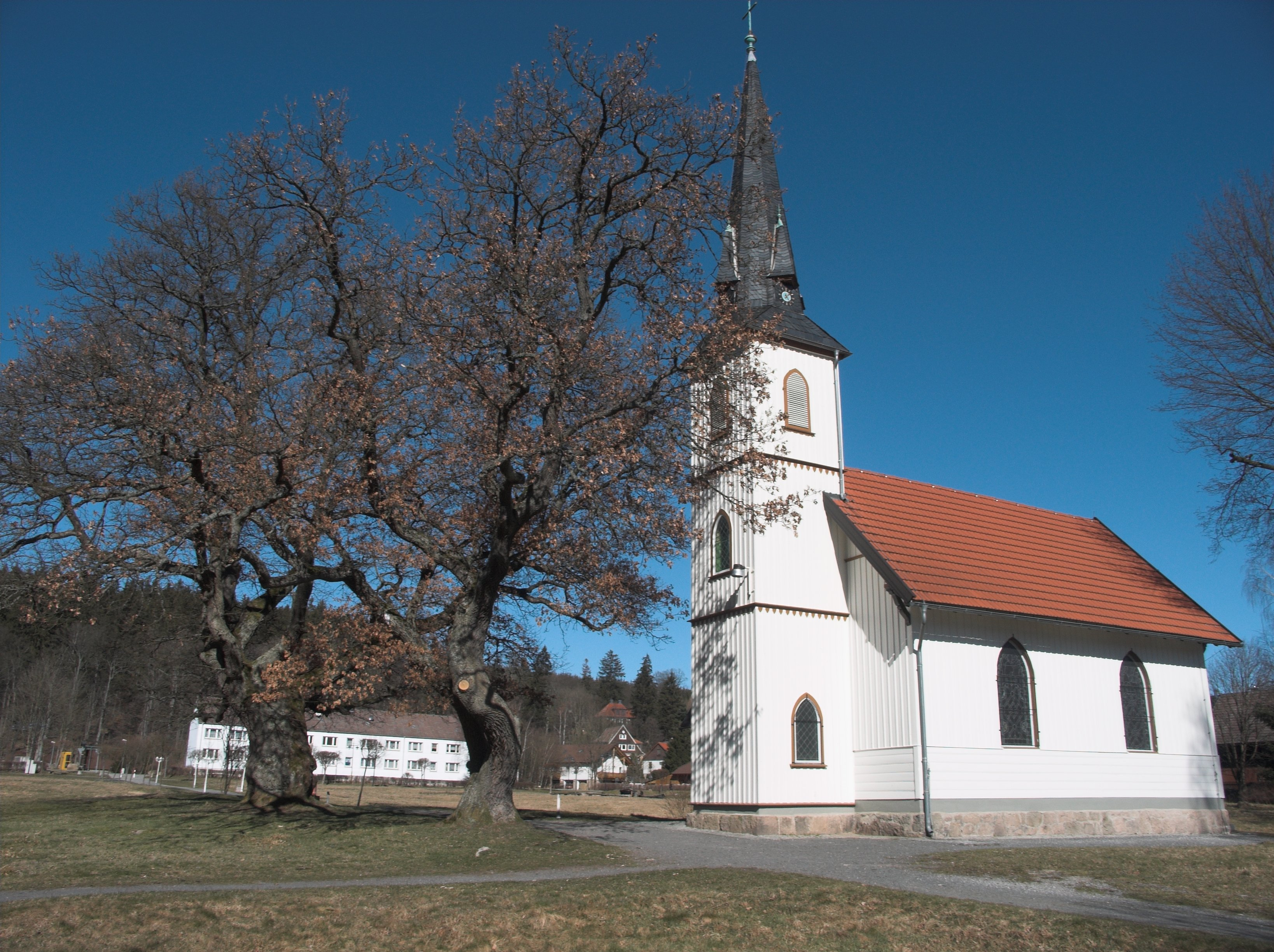
Smallest wooden church in Germany

Walther Grosse mentions fields under the Elend Road (unter dem elendischen Wege) for the first time in a manuscript of field names in the Amt of Elbingerode for 1483. In a Vogtei account for the Amt of Elbingerode (Harz) dated 1506/07 there is an entry which states: "Income from the sawmill at Elend in the Forest XII March" (Innome von der Sagemoln zum Elende deß Forst XII Mar[k]). There are a lot of indications that this sawmill had existed for some time before that.

On 1 January 2010, the municipality of Elend merged with the municipalities of Sorge, Stiege and Tanne, as well as the towns of Elbingerode (Harz), Hasselfelde and Benneckenstein (Harz), forming the town Oberharz am Brocken.

== Hiking ==
Not far from Elend is the Helenenruh, a rocky ridge with outstanding views, which is checkpoint no. 21 in the Harzer Wandernadel hiking network.

== Notable people ==
- Friedrich Krebs (1832–1905), first chief apostle of the New Apostolic Church
- Hartmut Esser (born 1943), sociologist, professor at the University of Mannheim

== Sources ==
- Karlheinz Brumme: Elend. Chronik eines Harzdörfchens unterm Brocken, Blankenburg, Wernigerode, o. J. [2008]
- Dietmar Schultke: Der DDR-Alltag in der Grenzkompanie Elend, in: 'Keiner kommt durch - Die Geschichte der innerdeutschen Grenze und Berliner Mauer, Aufbau-Verlag Berlin, 4. Auflage 2008
