= Galgenberg (Elbingerode) =

Coordinates: 51°46′24.6″N 10°49′00.2″E

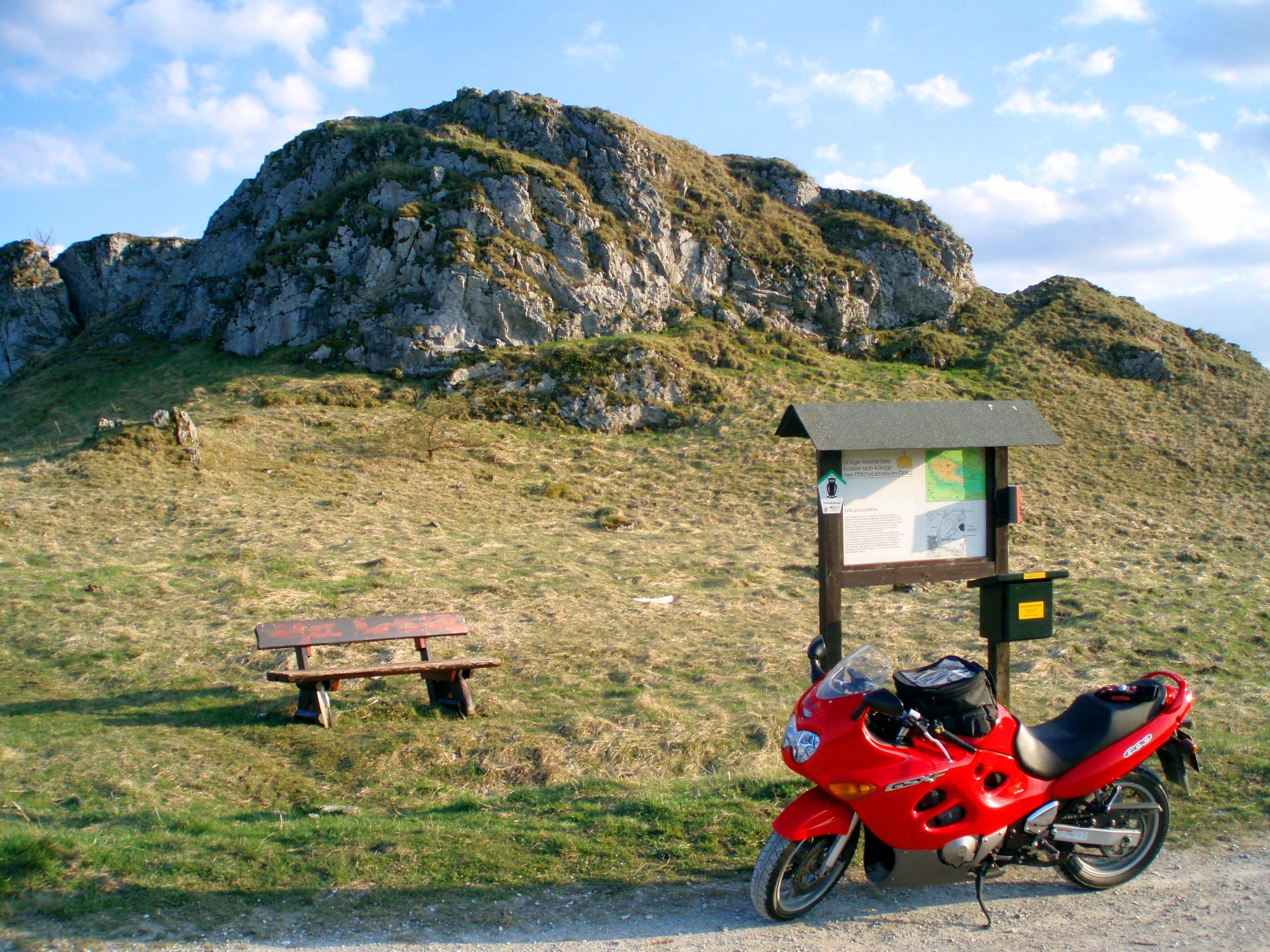
The Galgenberg from the north

The Galgenberg is a 506.1-metre-high hill east of Elbingerode (Harz) in the Harz Mountains of central Germany. It marks the highest point on the row of limestone crags found there. The old Trock Way (Trockweg), which ran from Quedlinburg to the imperial stronghold of Bodfeld, probably ran past the Galgenberg immediately to the north. East of the hill lies the abandoned village of Erdfelde that was closely linked to Bodfeld.

== History ==
As the name of the hill suggests, this spot is the old execution site of the town of Elbingerode, on which the gallows stood where many thieves were hanged.

== Walking ==
The Galgenberg is No. 38 in the network of hiking checkpoints in the Harzer Wandernadel.
