= Andreas Werckmeister =

German organist, music theorist, and composer

- Born: November 30, 1645; Benneckenstein, Germany
- Died: October 26, 1706 (aged 60) Halberstadt
- Genres: Baroque
- Occupations: Organist, Music theorist, Composer
- Instrument: Organ

Andreas Werckmeister (November 30, 1645 – October 26, 1706) was a German organist, music theorist, and composer of the Baroque era. He was responsible for a temperament that resulted in all tonalities sounding acceptable on the keyboard. This important step toward equal temperament was highly influential to the harmonic basis underlying much of subsequent Western music.

== Life ==
Born in Benneckenstein, Werckmeister attended schools in Nordhausen and Quedlinburg. He received his musical training from his uncles Heinrich Christian Werckmeister and Heinrich Victor Werckmeister. In 1664 he became an organist in Hasselfelde; ten years later in Elbingerode; and in 1696 of the Martinskirche in Halberstadt. He died in Halberstadt.

== Musical compositions ==
Of his compositions only a booklet remains: pieces for violin with basso continuo, with the title Musikalische Privatlust (1689). Also some organ works remain: Canzon in a-minor, Canzona in d-minor, Praeludium ex G, Canzonetta in D-major.

== Theoretical works ==
Werckmeister is best known today as a theorist, in particular through his writings Musicae mathematicae hodegus curiosus... (1687) and Musikalische Temperatur (1691), in which he described a system now referred to as well temperament (in which all keys are playable, as in J. S. Bach's later work The Well-Tempered Clavier) now known as Werckmeister temperament. The system distributes the Pythagorean comma among the four fifths G–D, D–A, A–E, and B–F♯, such that each is flattened by one-fourth of the comma (approximately 5.865 cents), leaving the remaining eight fifths as 3:2 proportions; this tended toward somewhat wider thirds than in equal temperament.

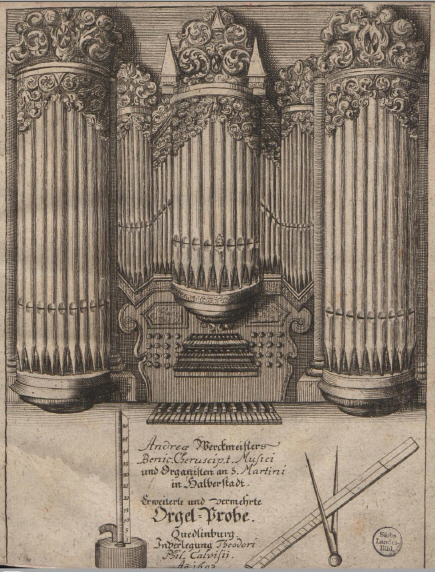
Title page of Andreas Werckmeister, Orgelprobe (1698).

Werckmeister's writings – particularly his writings on counterpoint – were well known to Johann Sebastian Bach. Werckmeister believed that well-crafted counterpoint, especially invertible counterpoint, was tied to the orderly movements of the planets, reminiscent of Kepler's view in Harmonice Mundi. According to George Buelow, "No other writer of the period regarded music so unequivocally as the end result of God’s work". Yet in spite of his focus on counterpoint, Werckmeister's work emphasized underlying harmonic principles.

== List of works ==
- Musicae mathematicae hodegus curiosus... (1687)
- Musikalische Temperatur, oder... (1691)
- Der Edlen Music-Kunst... (1691)
- Hypomnemata musica (1697)
- Erweierte und verbesserte Orgel-Probe (1698)
- Die nothwendigsten Anmerckungen und Reglen, wie der Bassus continuus... (1698)
- Cribrum musicum (1700)
- Harmonologia musica (1702)
- Musikalische Paradoxal-Discourse (1707)

== See also ==
- Werckmeister Harmonies, a 2000 film by Béla Tarr, titled after Werckmeister's ideas
- The Melancholy of Resistance, a novel by László Krasznahorkai, from which Tarr's film was adapted
