= Bodfeld =

Coordinates: 51°47′20″N 10°50′19″E

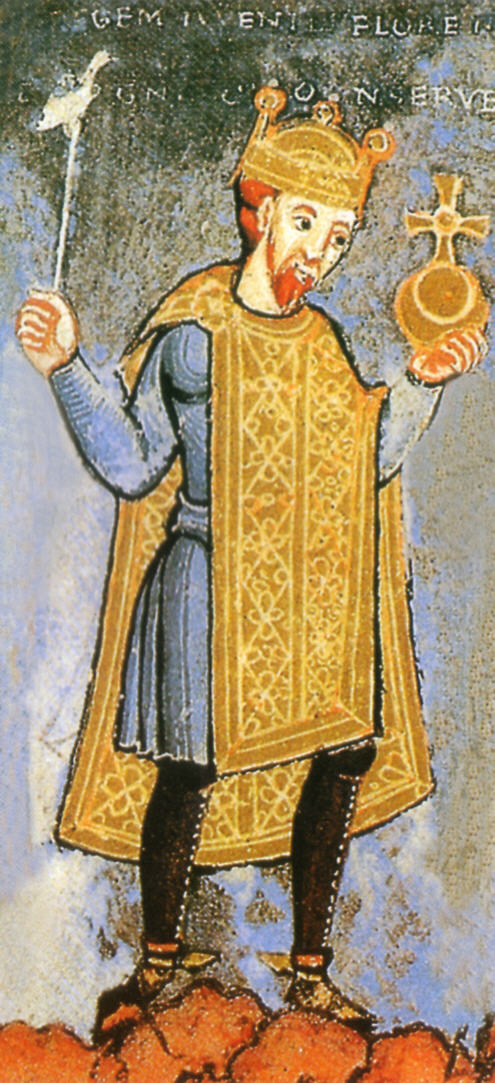
Henry III, miniature from around 1040

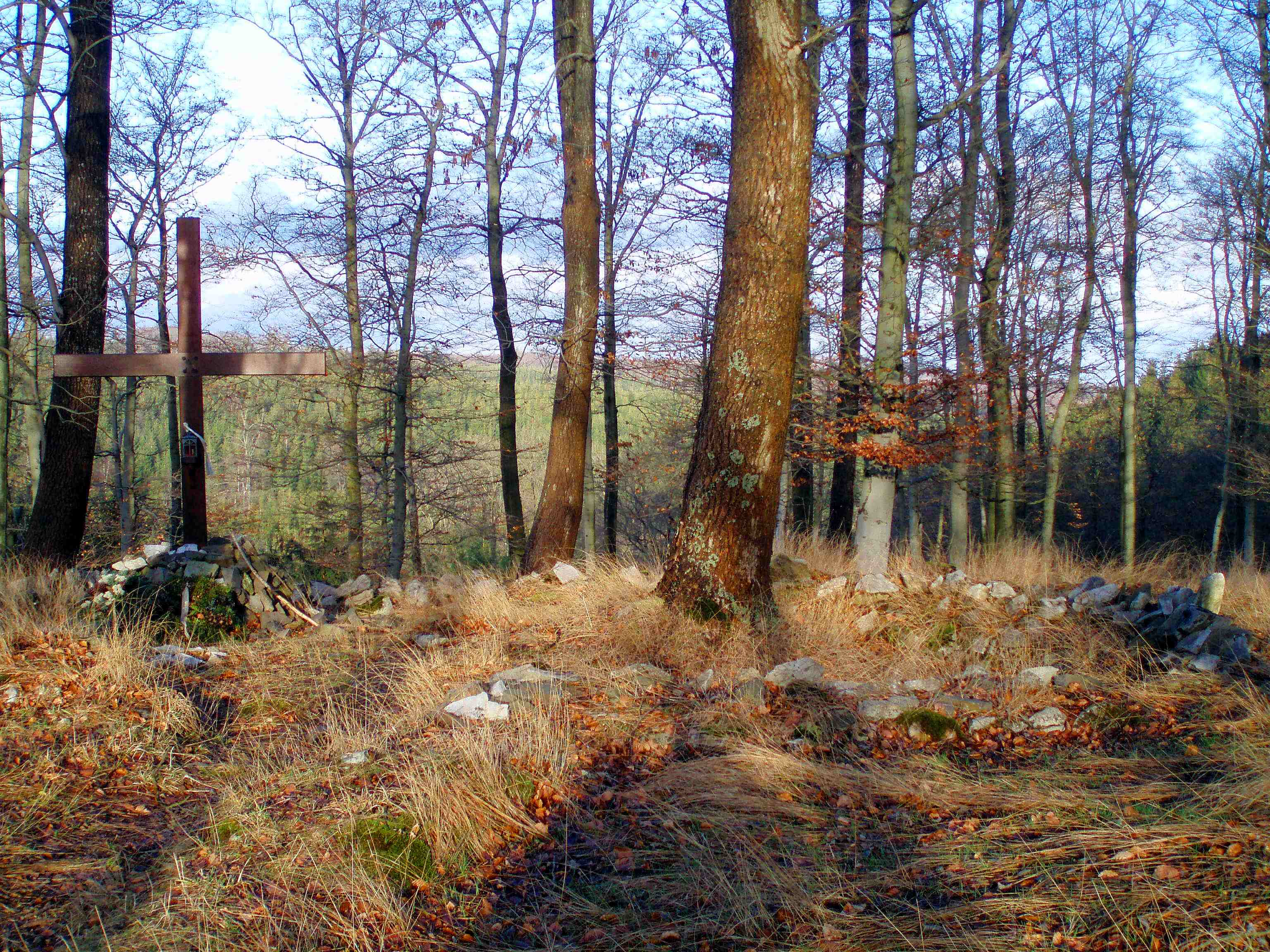
The unnamed hunting lodge today

Bodfeld was a small royal palace or lodge (German: Königspfalz) that was primarily established for hunting purposes and, when the town of Elbingerode emerged, for the administration of ore mining in the central Harz that underpinned the power of the Ottonian and Salian kings and emperors in medieval Europe. The term Bodfeld is also used to describe an area of forest that lies predominantly south of Elbingerode.

Today, the ruins of the legendary "palace" of Bodfeld are suspected to lie on a hill spur called the Schloßkopf north of Elbingerode.

== History ==
Surviving documents record at least 17 occasions when kings or emperors stayed at Bodfeld whilst hunting in the Harz. Henry I stayed in Bodfeld several times, for example he fell ill here in 935. Otto I characterised Bodfeld in 936 as a hunting lodge (Jagdhof); he visited Bodfeld at least 3 times and Otto II four times. Otto III spent at least 14 days in Bodfeld in 991 together with his grandmother, Adelheid, and visited it again in 995. Conrad II was recorded there once, and Henry III at least four times. The last document issued by him was written in Bodfeld (28 September 1056). Henry III died in Bodfeld after a seven-day illness on 5 October 1056 in the presence of the pope and many imperial princes. Henry IV became King of the Germans in Bodfeld in 1056.

Towards the end of the 13th century the royal hunting lodge at Bodfeld and its exact location began to sink into oblivion. However, thanks to intensive research by Paul Höfer memories of Bodfeld were re-awakened at the end of the 19th century. In view of the place name Königshof (Königshütte since 1936 when it merged with Rothehütte) he wrongly believed it to be the Königsburg on a rocky hill above the confluence of the Warme and Kalte Bode. He publicized this several times in the Harz Association's magazine for history and archaeology. Others supported his view including C. Schuchhardt in his 1924 publication, Fortresses of the Early Historical Period in Lower Saxony. In 1933 castle researcher, Paul Grimm, proved that the Königsburg could never have existed in the era of the Saxon kings, but had been built later. His evidence was that in excavations of the Königsburg no trace of red pottery had been found. In the run up to this, Schuchhardt had already changed his opinion in 1931.

Grimm now suspected Bodfeld to be on the other, northern side of the River Bode in the vicinity or on the site of the abandoned village of Lüttgen-Bodfeld, whose church, St. Andrew's, had been uncovered in the 19th century. He did not reach a definite conclusion, however, and wrote: "Confirmation of the exact location of the Bodfeld hunting lodge remains the subject of further research." In 1940, the diplomat, Carl Erdmann, also questioned Höfer's thesis and agreed with Grimm. Other researchers, such as Friedrich Stolberg, author of the standard work first published in 1967, Fortifications in and around the Harz from Early History to the Modern Period, followed suit and wrote: "The Königsburg near Königshütte is not directly related to the royal hunting lodge of Bodfeld on the other side of the Bode" It was only the most modern infrared aerial photographic technology and most recent archaeological analysis of excavated stone artefacts that confirmed the hitherto suspected presence of a royal lodge from the Ottonian period on the Schloßkopf by the upper reaches of the Teufelsbach in the Drecktal valley northeast of Elbingerode. This could well be the royal lodge of Bodfeld which, characteristically for the period of its construction, was built on a hill spur (see also Königspfalz Werla) although the River Bode that gave the lodge its name is about four to five kilometres from here. However, that appears to be irrelevant because the medieval Bodfeld was an extensive area of territory.

In terms of its design, the site on the Schloßkopf resembles the Pfalz of Grone laid out by Henry I. Based on Henry's written records, Carl Erdmann described the king, who was buried in Quedlinburg, as the owner of Bodfeld and proves that "Bodfeld cannot be judged to have the political character of a 'Pfalz'". This underscores the fact that resident monarchs in Bodfeld patently did not come here to celebrate an important church festival, whereas they always did in other places such as Quedlinburg, Magdeburg or Goslar. In 1967, Friedrich Stolberg, however, pointed out that this site was related to Saxon hunting lodges like Siptenfelde and its proximity to the Königsstieg ("King's Path") suggests there is a connexion. In all probability there was also a link between this hunting house (Jagdhaus) mentioned in 1483 and 1531 and the village of Erdfeld on the old Halberstadt Military Road, mentioned in 1343 in a deed by the Count of Regenstein and which lay just 1½ kilometres away. Erdfeld was abandoned in the late Middle Ages in favour of nearby Elbingerode.

From Heinz A. Behrens, historian and building archaeologist, who conducted the most recent research, we now have a reconstructed picture of the whole site thanks to archaeological and geo-electric surveys. There is an information board at the site which shows that the lodge was extensive yet defensible; it had a chapel, two round towers, a great hall, a second assembly hall, other residential buildings, gatehouse and stone walls on two sides.

== Bodfeld Forest ==
Bodfeld is also the name of an area of forest which Henry II ceded to Gandersheim Abbey in 1009 as part of an exchange. Its boundaries may be deduced from an enfeoffment letter by Abbess Sophia of Gandersheim dating to the year A.D. 1319. According to that this forest area extended from Braunlage in the west to Elbingerode in the northeast and to Stiege and Beneckenstein in the south.

== Other hunting lodges in the Harz ==
- Siptenfelde: Otto I issues documents here twice
- Hasselfelde: Henry III stayed here at least twice

== Sources ==
- Prell, Martin (1971), Auf alten Wegen zu neuen Erkenntnissen. Ein Beitrag zur Erforschung der mittelalterlichen Besiedlung der Elbingeröder Hochfläche im Harz. In: Nordharzer Jahrbuch 4, 1971, p. 7–27
- Wille, Lutz (2010), Zur Örtlichkeit des Reichshofes Bodfeld, in: Harz-Zeitschrift 62 (2010), p. 153–167.
