= Helenenruh =

Coordinates: 51°45′15″N 10°40′51″E

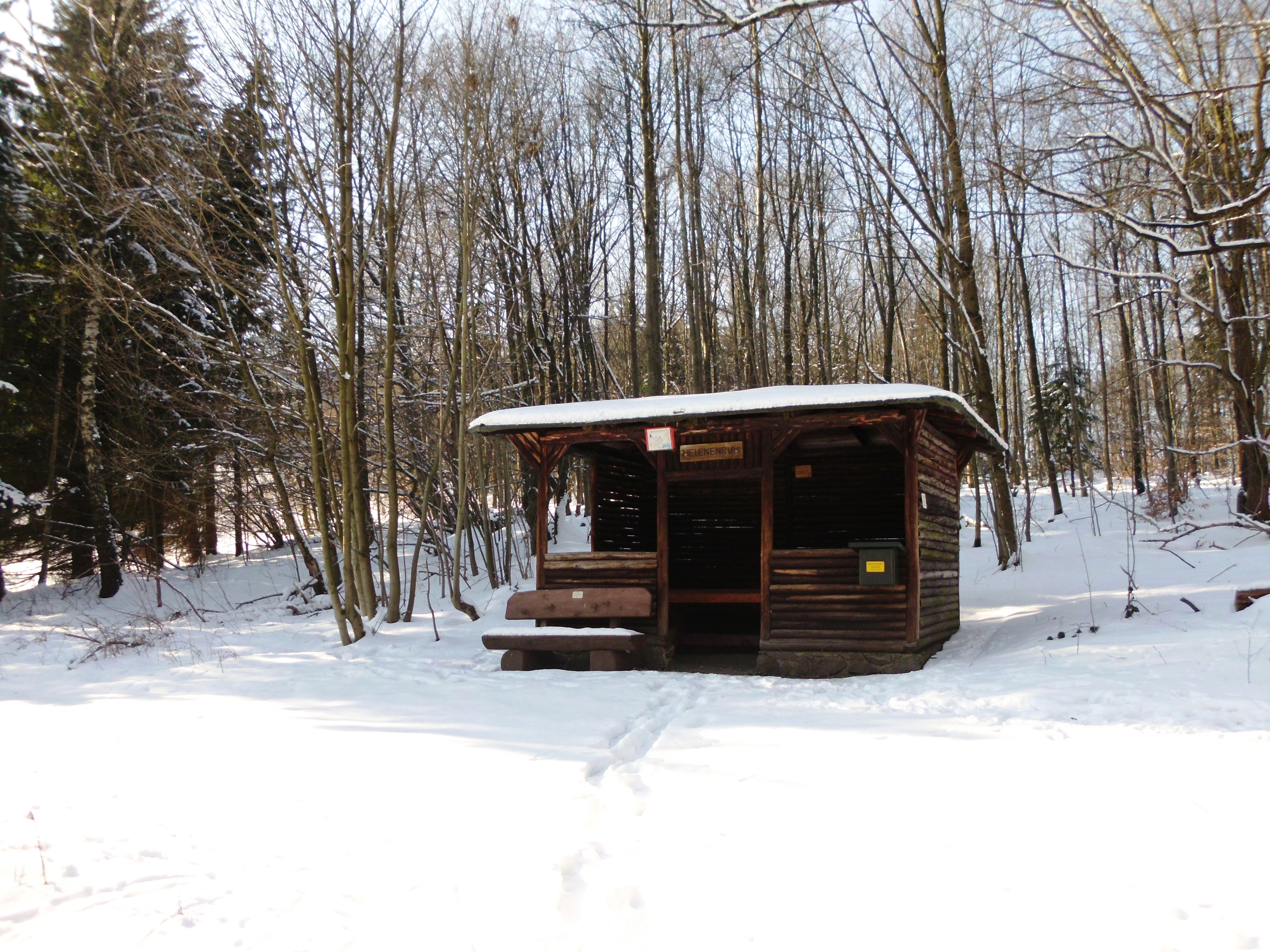
Refuge hut on the Helenenruh

The Helenenruh ("Helen's Rest") is a 629 metre high rocky ridge near the village of Elend in the Harz Mountains of central Germany.

Today there is a refuge hut and rest area here, from which there are outstanding views over the village of Schierke across to the Brocken, the highest mountain in the Harz. Other sights are the gorge of the Cold Bode river and the Schnarcherklippen rocks.

The Helenenruh is checkpoint no. 21 in the Harzer Wandernadel hiking system.
