= Benneckenstein =

- Stadtteil of Oberharz am Brocken
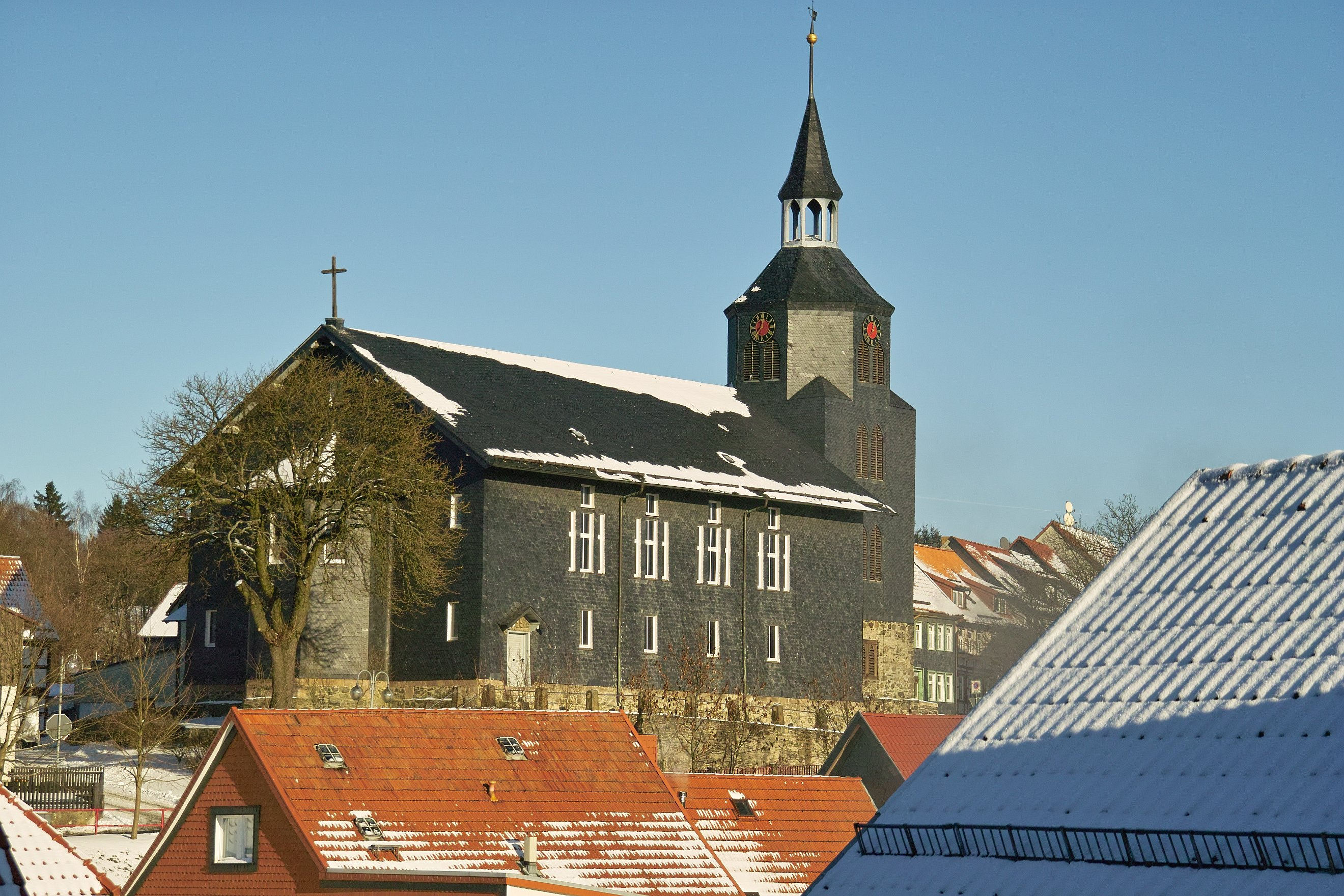
- Saint Lawrence Church

- Coat of arms
- Interactive map of Benneckenstein
- Location within Germany Location within Saxony-Anhalt
- Coordinates: 51°40′N 10°43′E
- Country: Germany
- State: Saxony-Anhalt
- District: Harz
- Town: Oberharz am Brocken

Area
  - Total: 23.65 km^{2} (9.13 sq mi)
- Elevation: 526 m (1,726 ft)

Population (2021-12-31)
  - Total: 1,698
  - Density: 71.80/km^{2} (186.0/sq mi)
- Time zone: UTC+01:00 (CET)
  - Summer (DST): UTC+02:00 (CEST)
- Postal codes: 38877
- Dialling codes: 039457
- Vehicle registration: HZ
- Website: stadtoberharz.de

Benneckenstein (German pronunciation: [ˈbɛnəkn̩ʃtaɪn]) is a town in the district of Harz, in Saxony-Anhalt, Germany. Since 1 January 2010, it has been part of the town of Oberharz am Brocken. Benneckenstein is in the eastern Harz, 14 km southeast of Braunlage, and 24 km south of Wernigerode. Its population is 1,698 (2021).

== Location ==
Benneckenstein lies in the Lower Harz within the Harz/Saxony-Anhalt Nature Park. It is located between the villages of Tanne to the north, Trautenstein to the east-northeast and Stiege to the east (all in Saxony-Anhalt), Rothesütte to the south (in Thuringia), Hohegeiß to the west (in Lower Saxony) and Sorge to the north-northwest (in Saxony-Anhalt). The village lies at a height of about 500 to 542 m above NN on the upper reaches of the Rappbode. Following the former Inner German Border to the west is the border with Lower Saxony and to the south that with Thuringia; about 3.3 km south-southwest of the village is the tripoint for the three states which is marked by the Drei-Länder-Stein.

The organist, composer and music theorist Andreas Werckmeister was born in Benneckenstein in 1645.

== Leisure ==
The secluded forest village of Grüntal (515 m), with its forester's lodge and a few holiday homes, is located by a clearing northeast of Benneckenstein and is also checkpoint 49 in the Harzer Wandernadel hiking network.
