= Oberharz am Brocken =

- Town
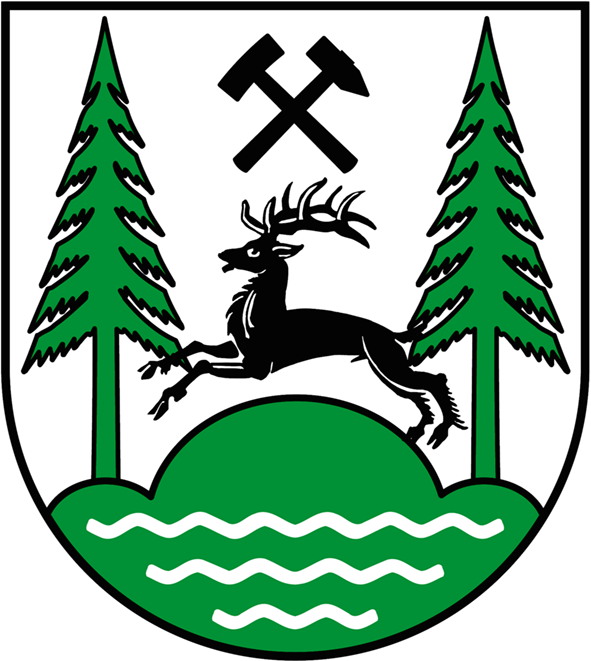
- Coat of arms

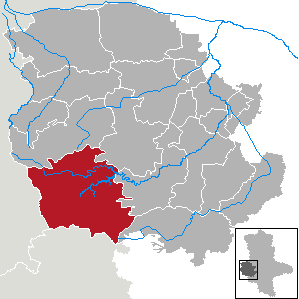
- Location of Oberharz am Brocken within Harz district
- Interactive map of Oberharz am Brocken
- Location within Germany Location within Saxony-Anhalt
- Coordinates: 51°43′N 10°49′E
- Country: Germany
- State: Saxony-Anhalt
- District: Harz

Government
  - Mayor (2018–25): Ronald Fiebelkorn (CDU)

Area
  - Total: 271.52 km^{2} (104.83 sq mi)
- Elevation: 475 m (1,558 ft)

Population (2025-12-31)
  - Total: 9,391
  - Density: 34.59/km^{2} (89.58/sq mi)
- Time zone: UTC+01:00 (CET)
  - Summer (DST): UTC+02:00 (CEST)
- Postal codes: 38875, 38877, 38899
- Dialling codes: 039454, 039455, 039457, 039459
- Vehicle registration: HZ
- Website: stadtoberharz.de

Oberharz am Brocken (German pronunciation: [ˈoːbɐhaːɐ̯ts ʔam ˈbʁɔkn̩], lit. 'Upper Harz on the Brocken') is a town in the Harz District, in Saxony-Anhalt, Germany. It was formed on 1 January 2010 by the merger of the town of Elbingerode with the municipalities of the former Verwaltungsgemeinschaft ("collective municipality") Brocken-Hochharz (except for Allrode).

The name chosen by the new town's administration has caused some disturbance, as the area is not part of the Upper Harz region, which traditionally refers to the seven mining towns (Bergstädte) of Clausthal, Zellerfeld, Andreasberg, Altenau, Lautenthal, Wildemann, and Grund, all located in the neighbouring state of Lower Saxony. A lawsuit filed by the Lower Saxon Samtgemeinde ("collective municipality") Oberharz in 2009 was dismissed by the Saxony-Anhalt administrative court in Magdeburg.

== Subdivision ==
Constituent subdivisions

The town consists of the following ten Ortschaften or municipal divisions (former municipalities):

- Benneckenstein
- Elbingerode
- Elend
- Hasselfelde
- Königshütte
- Rübeland
- Sorge
- Stiege
- Tanne
- Trautenstein

The merger has united different areas each with its own distinct administrative history: Benneckenstein and Sorge had formed an exclave of the former Bishopric of Halberstadt and were incorporated into the Prussian Principality of Halberstadt in 1648. The town of Elbingerode with the municipalities of Elend, Königshof und Rothehütte (i.e. Königshütte) belonged to the Brunswick Principality of Lüneburg (former Principality of Grubenhagen), from 1814 Kingdom of Hanover. Hasselfelde, Rübeland, Stiege, Tanne, and Trautenstein since 1815 were part of the Duchy of Brunswick.
