= Allrode =

Former municipality in the Harz region of Germany

- Ortsteil of Thale
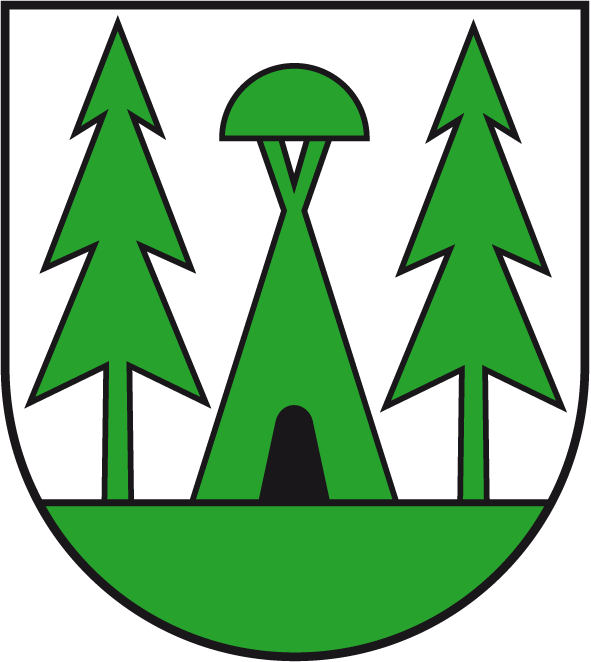
- Coat of arms
- Interactive map of Allrode
- Location within Germany Location within Saxony-Anhalt
- Coordinates: 51°41′N 10°58′E
- Country: Germany
- State: Saxony-Anhalt
- District: Harz
- Town: Thale

Area
  - Total: 17.41 km^{2} (6.72 sq mi)
- Elevation: 448 m (1,470 ft)

Population (2009-12-31)
  - Total: 654
  - Density: 37.6/km^{2} (97.3/sq mi)
- Time zone: UTC+01:00 (CET)
  - Summer (DST): UTC+02:00 (CEST)
- Postal codes: 06507
- Dialling codes: 039487
- Vehicle registration: HZ

Allrode (German pronunciation: [alˈʁoːdə]) is a village and a former municipality in the district of Harz, in Saxony-Anhalt, Germany. Since 1 January 2011, it is part of the town Thale.

There are two prominent trees - the Hohle Eiche ("hollow oak") and Adlereiche ("eagle oak") - in the woods northeast of the village that were checkpoints 57 and 58 in the Harzer Wandernadel hiking network. Today checkpoint 57 is the Echowiese Allrode.
