= Hasselfelde =

- Stadtteil of Oberharz am Brocken
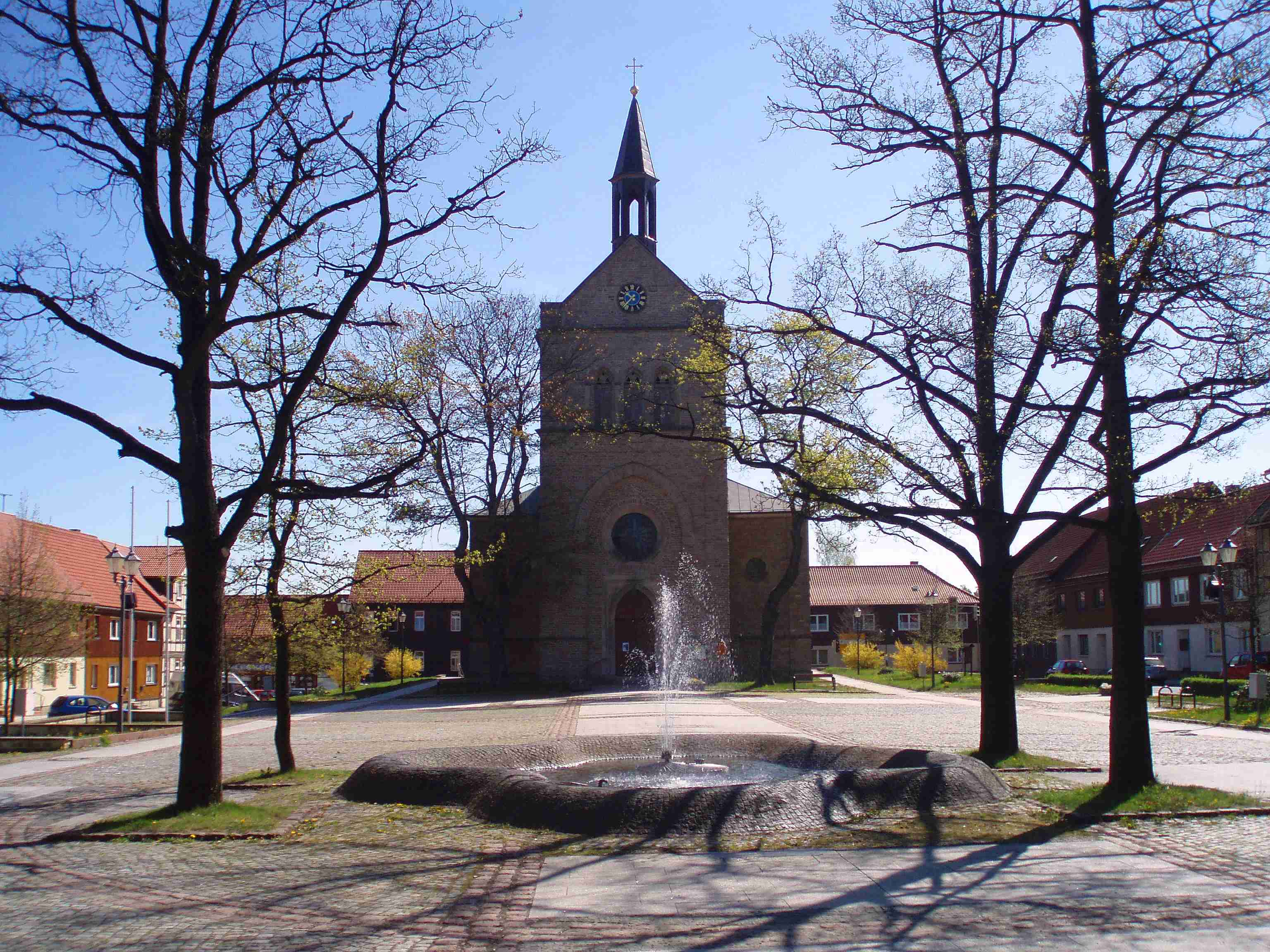
- Town square with Saint Anthony’s Church

- Coat of arms
- Interactive map of Hasselfelde
- Location within Germany Location within Saxony-Anhalt
- Coordinates: 51°41′26″N 10°51′19″E
- Country: Germany
- State: Saxony-Anhalt
- District: Harz
- Town: Oberharz am Brocken

Area
  - Total: 74.28 km^{2} (28.68 sq mi)
- Elevation: 488 m (1,601 ft)

Population (2021-12-31)
  - Total: 1,941
  - Density: 26.13/km^{2} (67.68/sq mi)
- Time zone: UTC+01:00 (CET)
  - Summer (DST): UTC+02:00 (CEST)
- Postal codes: 38899
- Dialling codes: 039459
- Vehicle registration: HZ
- Website: stadtoberharz.de

Hasselfelde (German pronunciation: [hasl̩ˈfɛldə]) is a town in the district of Harz, in Saxony-Anhalt, Germany. It is in the eastern Harz, approximately 17 km south of Wernigerode. Since 1 January 2010 it has been part of the town of Oberharz am Brocken. Its population is 1,941 (2021).

== Transport ==
The town has a railway station on the Selke Valley Railway, part of the Harz Narrow Gauge Railways (HSB).

== Sights ==
=== Harz charcoal burning museum ===
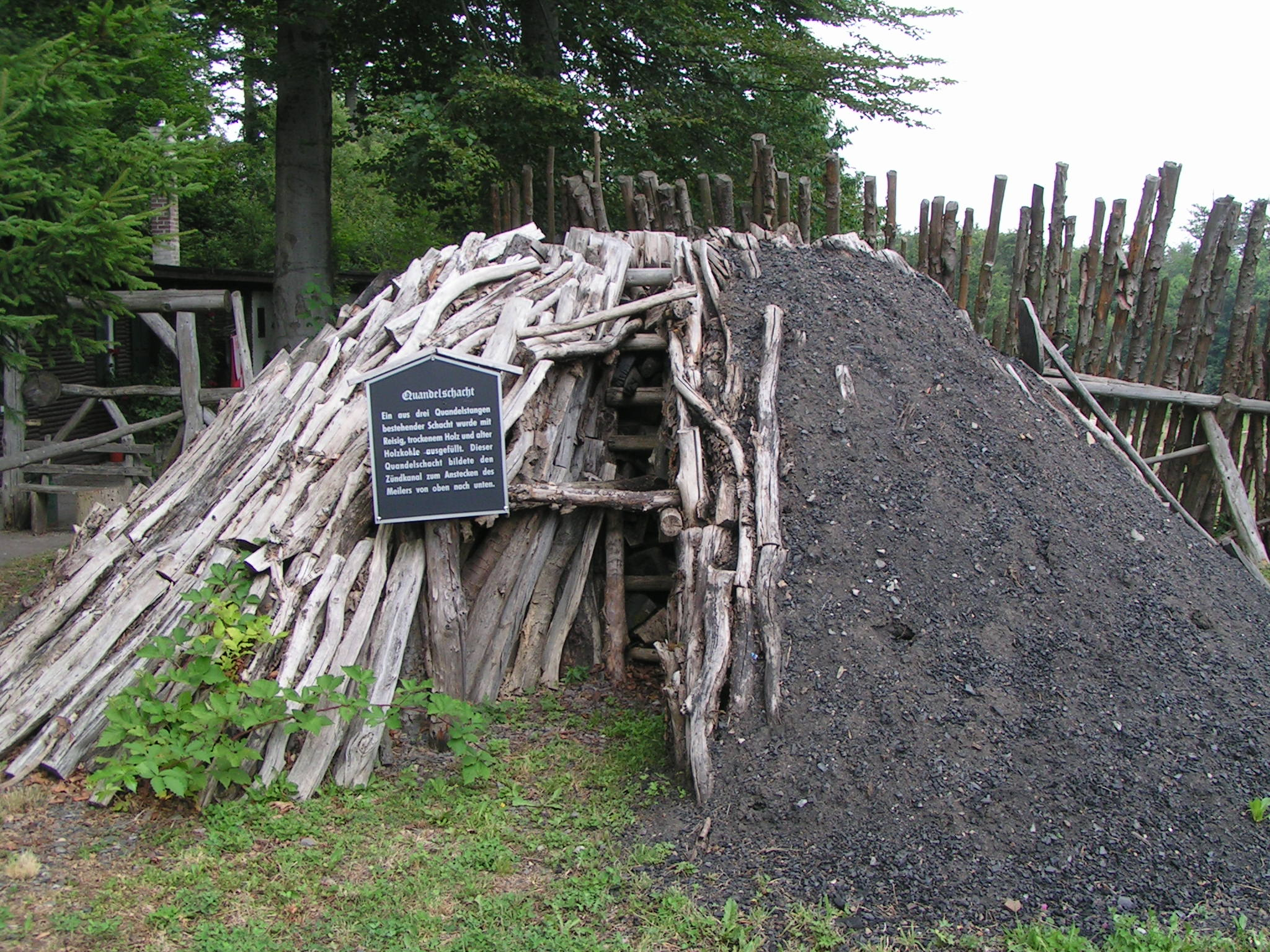
Charcoal burning

Along the road leading to Blankenburg is the Harzköhlerei Stemberghaus. This is an open-air museum that produces charcoal in the traditional way. The site includes a restaurant, the Köhlerhütte, built in 2012, and a souvenir shop. The museum is checkpoint 60 in the Harzer Wandernadel hiking network.

=== Historical Train Station ===
The historical building of the train station can be visited (outside only) and is currently owned by a local software company named RR Software. After the purchase, the train station was renovated by the company in recent years. The outside of the building remained historically correct with a refurbished wooden structure, typical for buildings in the region.

=== Memorial Stone on the Town Square ===
A memorial stone dedicated "to those who suffered and lost their lives in wars and under terror and violence" is located in the northwest corner of the central town square. During socialist rule in East Germany this stone had a much larger plaque stating "We Want Peace", which in 1993 was replaced by the present one. Judging by the number of holes drilled in the stone and by their location it is apparent that this stone had more uses in the past.

== Personalities ==
- Hermann Blumenau was born in Hasselfelde.
- Andreas Werckmeister was organist and music theorist in Hasselfelde from 1664 to 1674.
