= Stiege =

- Stadtteil of Oberharz am Brocken
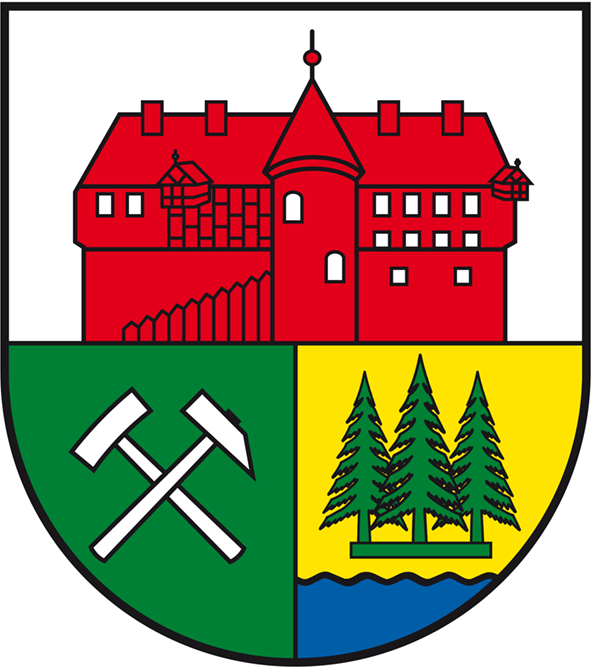
- Coat of arms
- Interactive map of Stiege
- Location within Germany Location within Saxony-Anhalt
- Coordinates: 51°40′0″N 10°53′02″E
- Country: Germany
- State: Saxony-Anhalt
- District: Harz
- Town: Oberharz am Brocken

Area
  - Total: 31.74 km^{2} (12.25 sq mi)
- Elevation: 478 m (1,568 ft)

Population (2021-12-31)
  - Total: 862
  - Density: 27.2/km^{2} (70.3/sq mi)
- Time zone: UTC+01:00 (CET)
  - Summer (DST): UTC+02:00 (CEST)
- Postal codes: 38899
- Dialling codes: 039459
- Vehicle registration: HZ
- Website: stadtoberharz.de

Stiege (German pronunciation: [ˈʃtiːɡə]) is a village and a former municipality in the district of Harz, in Saxony-Anhalt, Germany. Since 1 January 2010, it is part of the town Oberharz am Brocken. Its population is 862 (2021).

== Transport ==
The village has a railway station on the Selke Valley Railway, part of the Harz Narrow Gauge Railways (HSB).
