= Sorge, Saxony-Anhalt =

Sorge
- Stadtteil of Oberharz am Brocken
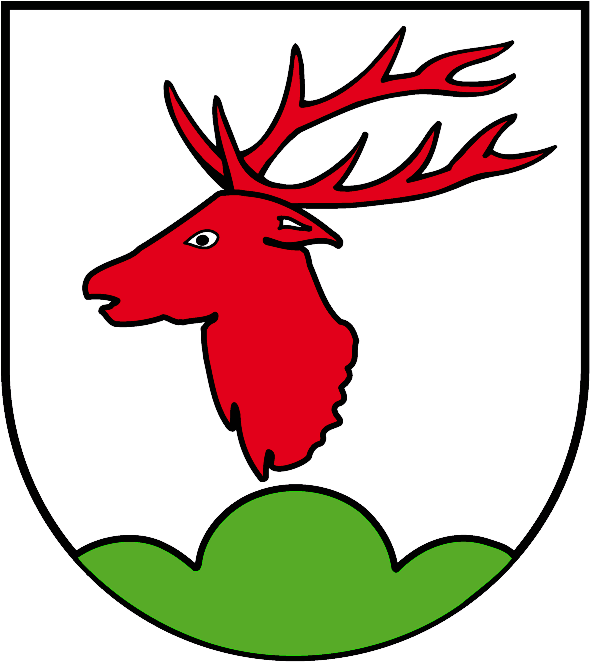
- Coat of arms
- Interactive map of Sorge
- Location within Germany Location within Saxony-Anhalt
- Coordinates: 51°41′34″N 10°41′54″E
- Country: Germany
- State: Saxony-Anhalt
- District: Harz
- Town: Oberharz am Brocken

Area
  - Total: 5.92 km^{2} (2.29 sq mi)
- Elevation: 486 m (1,594 ft)

Population (2021-12-31)
  - Total: 81
  - Density: 14/km^{2} (35/sq mi)
- Time zone: UTC+01:00 (CET)
  - Summer (DST): UTC+02:00 (CEST)
- Postal codes: 38875
- Dialling codes: 039457
- Vehicle registration: HZ
- Website: stadtoberharz.de

Sorge (German pronunciation: [ˈzɔʁɡə]) is a village and a former municipality in the district of Harz, in Saxony-Anhalt, Germany. Since 1 January 2010, it is part of the town Oberharz am Brocken. Its population is 81 (2021). The name of the town means "Worry" in German.
