= Tanne, Saxony-Anhalt =

Village in Saxony-Anhalt, Germany

Tanne
- Stadtteil of Oberharz am Brocken
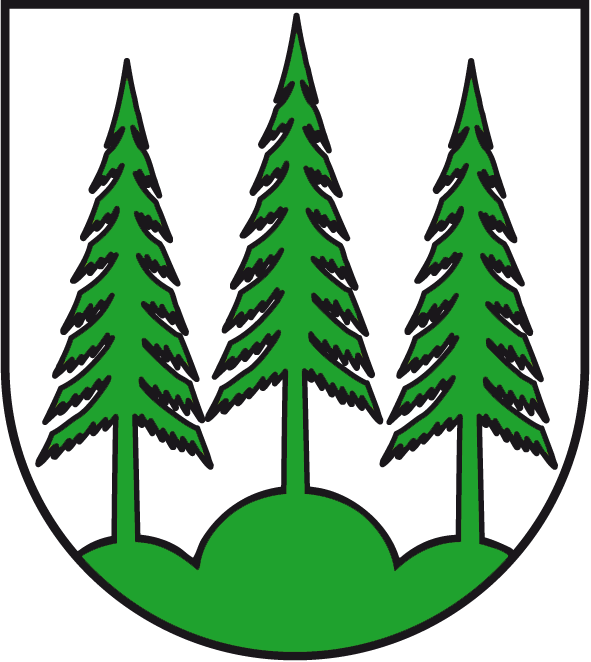
- Coat of arms
- Interactive map of Tanne
- Location within Germany Location within Saxony-Anhalt
- Coordinates: 51°41′58″N 10°43′20″E
- Country: Germany
- State: Saxony-Anhalt
- District: Harz
- Town: Oberharz am Brocken

Area
  - Total: 27.8 km^{2} (10.7 sq mi)
- Elevation: 460–540 m (1,510–1,770 ft)

Population (2024-12-31)
  - Total: 445
  - Density: 16.0/km^{2} (41.5/sq mi)
- Time zone: UTC+01:00 (CET)
  - Summer (DST): UTC+02:00 (CEST)
- Postal codes: 38875
- Dialling codes: 039457
- Vehicle registration: HZ
- Website: www.tanne-harz.de

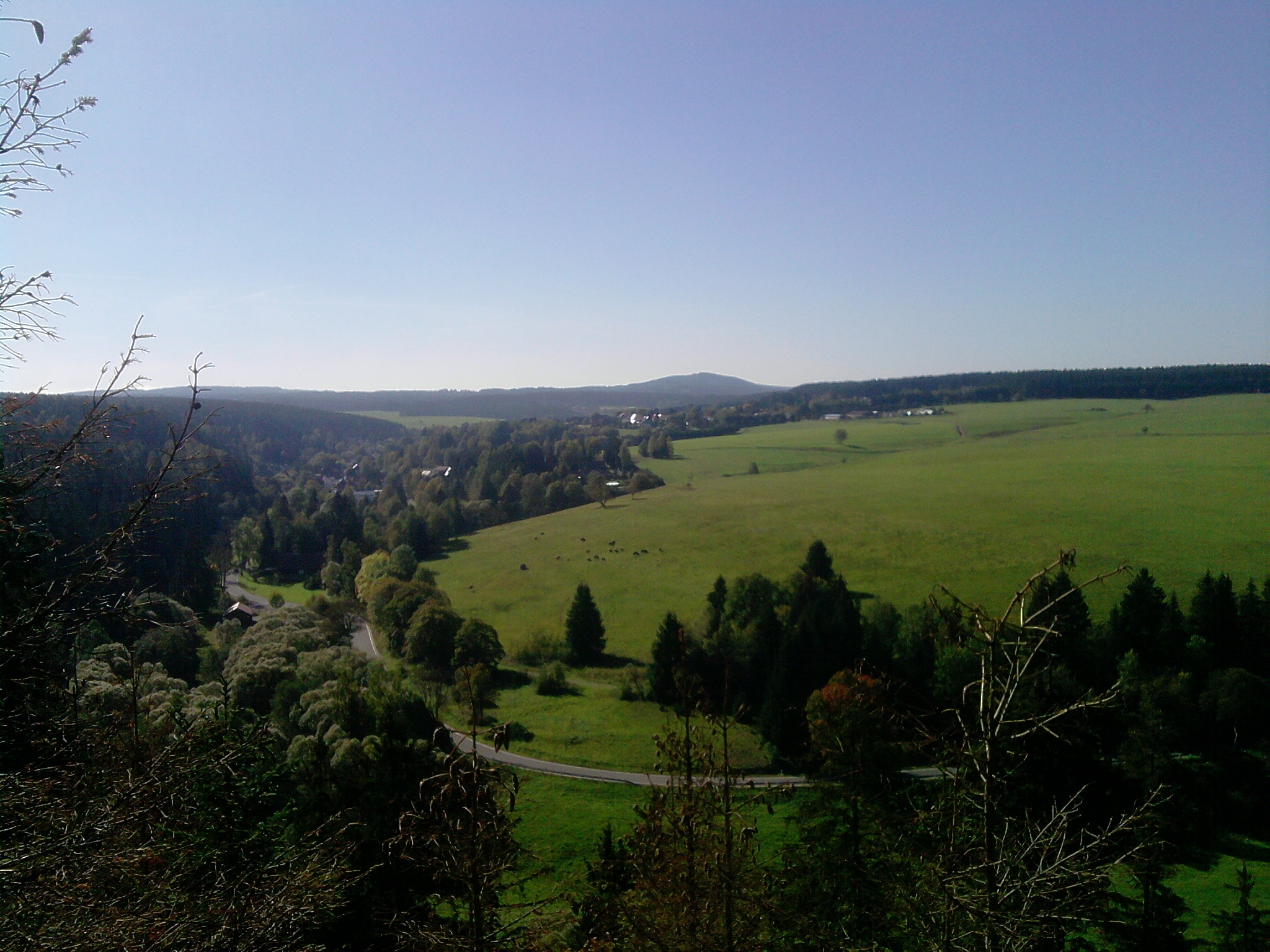
View of Tanne from a viewing point on the Kapitelsberg (2011)

Tanne (German pronunciation: [ˈtanə]) is a village and a former municipality in the district of Harz, in Saxony-Anhalt, Germany. Since 1 January 2010, it is part of the town Oberharz am Brocken. Its population is 445 (2024).

== History ==
Iron and copper smelting in the area of today’s village of Tanne can be traced back to the early 13th century. The oldest smelting site was the copper smelter at Silberkulk, located near the Thuringian Way, a route crossing the Harz Mountains, and the Thuringian Ford at the Warme Bode River. It was first mentioned in 1226 in a document as am silverkolch. The smelter appears again in the inventory of the County of Regenstein in 1262, this time referred to as casam, que in vulgari appelatur sylverkolch (“the smelter popularly called Silberkulk”). In 1504, this smelter was converted into a sawmill, which burned down shortly afterward.

The actual Tanne smelter, first mentioned in 1355, was one of the oldest ironworks in the Harz region. It is documented that on November 8, 1355, Counts Bernhard the Elder and Bernhard the Younger of Regenstein declared their willingness to take over, for a payment of 200 Brandenburg marks and for a period of 20 years, half of the hunting and forestry rights in the Harz, de Langelge und de hutten unde tollen tor Dannen (“the smelter and toll at Tanne”) from Bishop Albrecht II of Halberstadt (served 1325–1358). This marks the first documented mention of the present-day village of Tanne.

Through an agreement with the Regenstein family, the lands of Langelge, the smelter, and the toll station at Tanne were transferred back into the possession of the Bishop of Halberstadt on June 13, 1427, in exchange for the Regenstein castle of Neinstedt, which had been pledged to Anhalt. The contract of 1427 was later amended so that Tanne came entirely into the possession of the Dukes of Brunswick-Lüneburg, while the Bishop of Halberstadt received financial and territorial compensation. In 1494, Count Ulrich II of Regenstein was granted the smelter and toll rights at Tanne, along with timber rights at the Langelge, by the Duke of Brunswick. The feudal contract was renewed in 1515 by the Counts of Regenstein. The smelter remained in the possession of the Counts of Blankenburg and Regenstein until 1599. When the Regenstein lineage died out in 1599, the fief reverted to their feudal overlord, the Duke of Brunswick.

Until 1945, Tanne belonged to the state of Brunswick and was part of the district of Blankenburg. In 1950, the village was assigned to the district of Wernigerode and has been part of the newly formed district of Harz since July 1, 2007. This new district resulted from the merger of the districts of Wernigerode, Quedlinburg, and Halberstadt in the federal state of Saxony-Anhalt.

In 1965/66, the Tanne smelter ceased operations, and production was transferred to Königshütte.

On January 1, 2010, the municipality of Tanne merged with the municipalities of Sorge, Stiege, and Elend, as well as the towns of Elbingerode (Harz), Hasselfelde, and Benneckenstein (Harz), to form the town of Oberharz am Brocken.
