= Iberg Dripstone Cave =

Public cave and geology museum in Lower Saxony, northwestern Germany

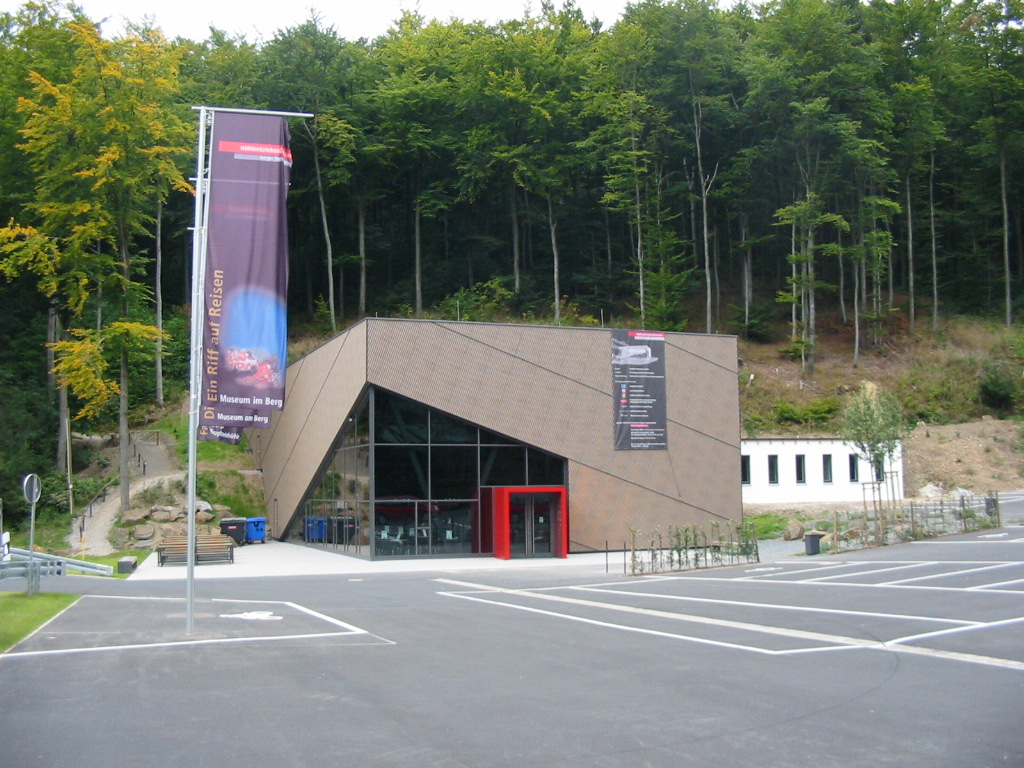
- View of the Museum am Berg built in 2008
- Interactive map of Iberg Dripstone Cave
- Location: near Bad Grund, Harz mountains, Germany
- Coordinates: 51°49′03″N 10°15′10″E
- Length: 220 m
- Elevation: 440 m
- Discovery: 1723
- Geology: Dripstone cave
- Show cave opened: 1874
- Show cave length: 351 m
- Lighting: electric (since 1912)
- Visitors: 60,500 (2004–2008)
- Website: Official website

The Iberg Dripstone Cave (German: Iberger Tropfsteinhöhle) is a public cave and geology museum in southern Lower Saxony near Bad Grund, Germany. It is located on the western edge of the Harz mountains in the 563-metre-high (1,847 ft) Iberg mountain at a height of 440 metres (1,440 ft) above sea level in the chalk of an upper Devonian atoll reef. The actual dripstone cave is 123 metres long. With its 78-metre-long (256 ft) Captain Spatzier Gallery, the Yellow Climb (Gelben Stieg) and two other caverns, the total length of the cave is 300 metres (980 ft).

Between 2006 and 2008, the cave was turned into a 'cave experience centre' with the three main themes of "Fascination Cave" "The oldest family in the world" and "A reef on a journey".

== History ==
The cave was discovered in the 16th century by miners, who were looking for deposits of limonite or 'brown iron ore'. In 1524, the presence of caverns in the Iberg massif was mentioned for the first time. The first account in 1737 described a visit to the cave by a doctor, Franz Ernst Brückmann, on 30 March 1723. In 1874, paths and steps were laid out and the show cave was opened to the public with a viewable length of 220 metres. The entrance gallery, the Captain Spatzier Gallery (Hauptmann-Spatzier-Stollen), was built in 1910 and 1911. Electric lighting was added in 1912 and was extended in 1935.

== Geology ==
The limestone mountain was originally a coral reef, formed about 385 million years ago on the spot where Madagascar lies today. it was subsequently moved to its present-day site as a result of tectonic plate movements over several hundred million years.

The gallery built in 1910–11 runs through two natural caverns, the first being opened up as a new section, the Yellow Climb (Gelben Stieg), a former space largely filled with brown iron ore that had probably been excavated in the 16th century. In one chamber, blue and green speleothems coloured by copper minerals can be seen. The usual red coloration of the speleothems in the cave is due to the presence of iron. Narrow crevices that enter from the north are richly clad with sinter. Helictites may be seen at the southern main entrance. This entrance continues in the direction of the Spatzier Gallery in curves with splendid scour holes (Auskolkungen).

== Tourism ==
The dripstone cave soon became very popular and one of the tourist attractions of the Harz. There were 556 visitors in 1881 and 8,436 came in 1913. Up to the Second World War, visitor numbers continued to climb, reaching 15,000 in 1937. After the war the numbers rose enormously, because the two popular Rübeländ dripstone caves, Baumann's Cave and Hermann's Cave, now lay in East Germany. The construction of a new main entrance, a new car park and the installation of the first 'special effects' lighting raised visitor numbers even more. In 1950 there were 88,000 visitors and, in 1953, 165,000. In 1972 the numbers crossed the 200,000 threshold for the first time. In 2003 there were 63,872 visitors, in 2007 still 50,847. In 2008 numbers rose again, to 76.971, as a result of the opening of the Cave Experience Centre (HöhlenErlebnisZentrums). From 2004 to 2008 the average annual number of visitors was 60,479. This makes it one of the most popular show caves in Germany.

The high visitor numbers may also be put down to the cave's location which is easily accessible by road, being close to the B 242, which is a main access route for day trippers in the Upper Harz area.

== Cave Experience Centre ==
Between 2006 and 2008 the caves were converted into a Cave Experience Centre (HöhlenErlebnisZentrum). A clearly visible cubic building was constructed next to the car park and the B 242. This so-called Museum am Berg ("museum on the mountain") has a 160-metre-long (520 ft), 17 to 19-degree sloping tunnel (Museum im Berg) linking it to the old Iberg Dripstone Cave. This expansion and conversion has the clear imprint of the district conservationist, Prof. Dr. Reinhard Roseneck, who two years earlier had come up with a new concept for the Cistercian abbey at Walkenried. The cost of the conversion was 3.85 million euros.

=== Museum am Berg ===
In the Museum am Berg, the 'oldest family in the world' is displayed: By researching the bones found at the Lichtenstein Cave about 10 miles to the south, several Bronze Age families could be genetically identified. DNA tests on 300 local inhabitants showed that 40 of them were descendants of these Bronze Age people.

In addition, the museum looks at life in the Bronze Age and displays a number of artefacts from the period. A replica of the Lichtenstein Cave, which is not accessible to tourists, may be considered.

=== Museum im Berg ===
The Museum im Berg is located in a new gallery built between 2006 and 2008 and portrays the theme "A reef on a journey" (Ein Riff auf Reisen). The presentation explains the formation of the Iberg as a coral reef and its subsequent move to its present-day location.

=== Fascination Cave ===
This section known as "Fascination Cave" (Faszination Höhle) runs through parts of the Iberg Dripstone Cave opened up over 100 years ago.

=== Owner ===
The owner of the Cave Experience Centre is the district of Osterode am Harz.

== See also ==
- List of show caves in Germany
- List of caves
