= Atta Cave =

Cave in Attendorn, Germany

Coordinates: 51°07′30″N 7°54′56″E

Atta Cave Attahöhle
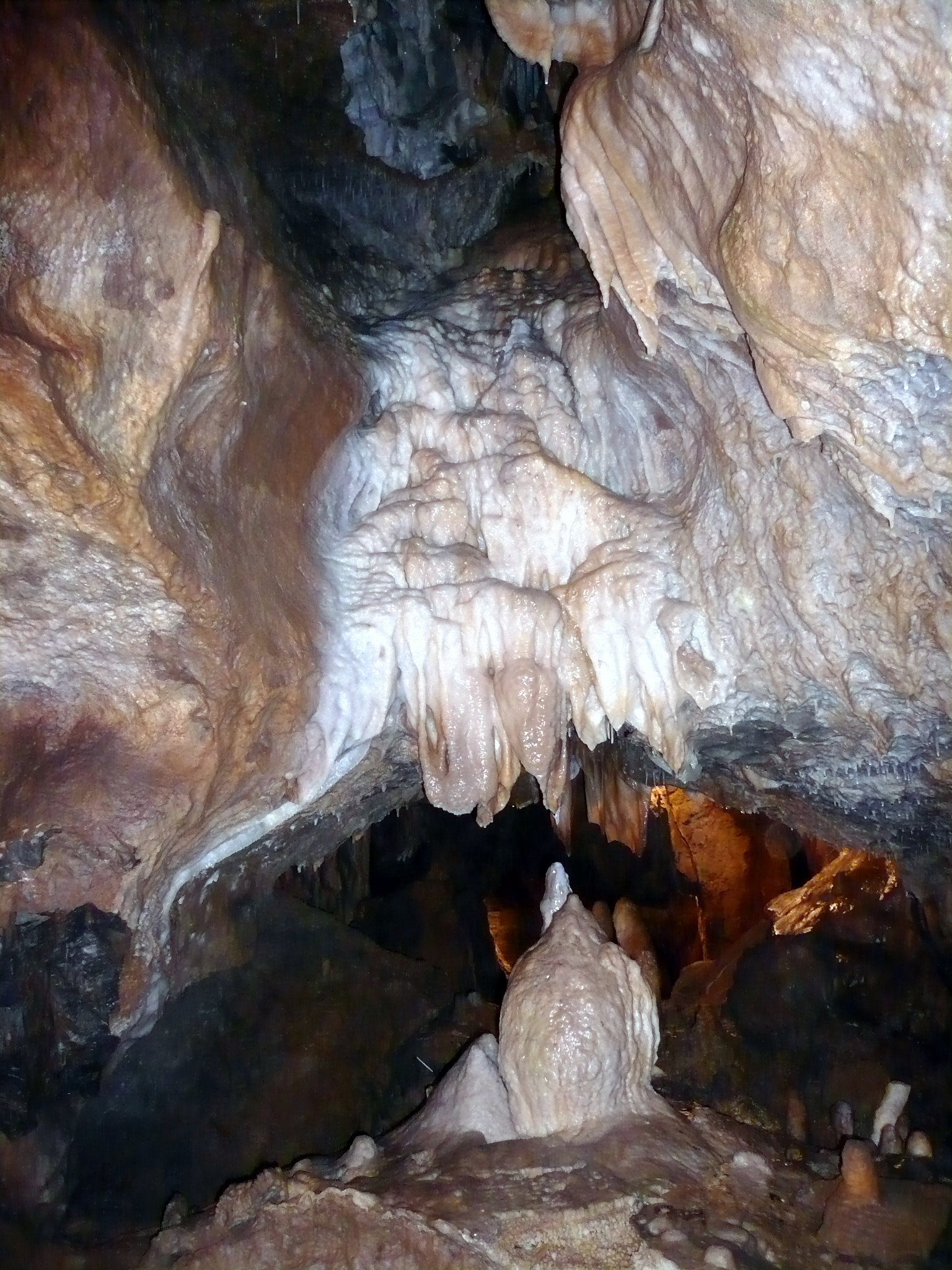
- Interactive map of Atta Cave; Attahöhle
- Location: Attendorn, Germany
- Length: 6670 m
- Discovery: 1907
- Geology: dripstone cave
- Show cave opened: 1907
- Show cave length: 500 m
- Lighting: electric
- Features: Most visited show cave in Germany
- Website: Official site

The Atta Cave (German: Atta-Höhle) or Attendorn Dripstone Cave (Attendorner Tropfsteinhöhle) in Attendorn is one of the largest dripstone caves in Germany.

The cave was discovered during the quarrying of limestone at the Bigge Valley Limestone Works (Biggetaler Kalkwerk) on 19 July 1907 and was opened up by the owners to tourists that same year. Today the Atta Cave is the most-visited show cave in Germany, receiving around 350,000 tourists per year, and is an important economic factor for the town.

Amongst its attractions are numerous calc-sinter flowstone drapes, colourfully tinctured by iron oxides. There are also many stalactites, stalagmites and stalagnates. Several pieces of calcite crystal formations were moved into the public area of the cave in order to be displayed there.

== History ==
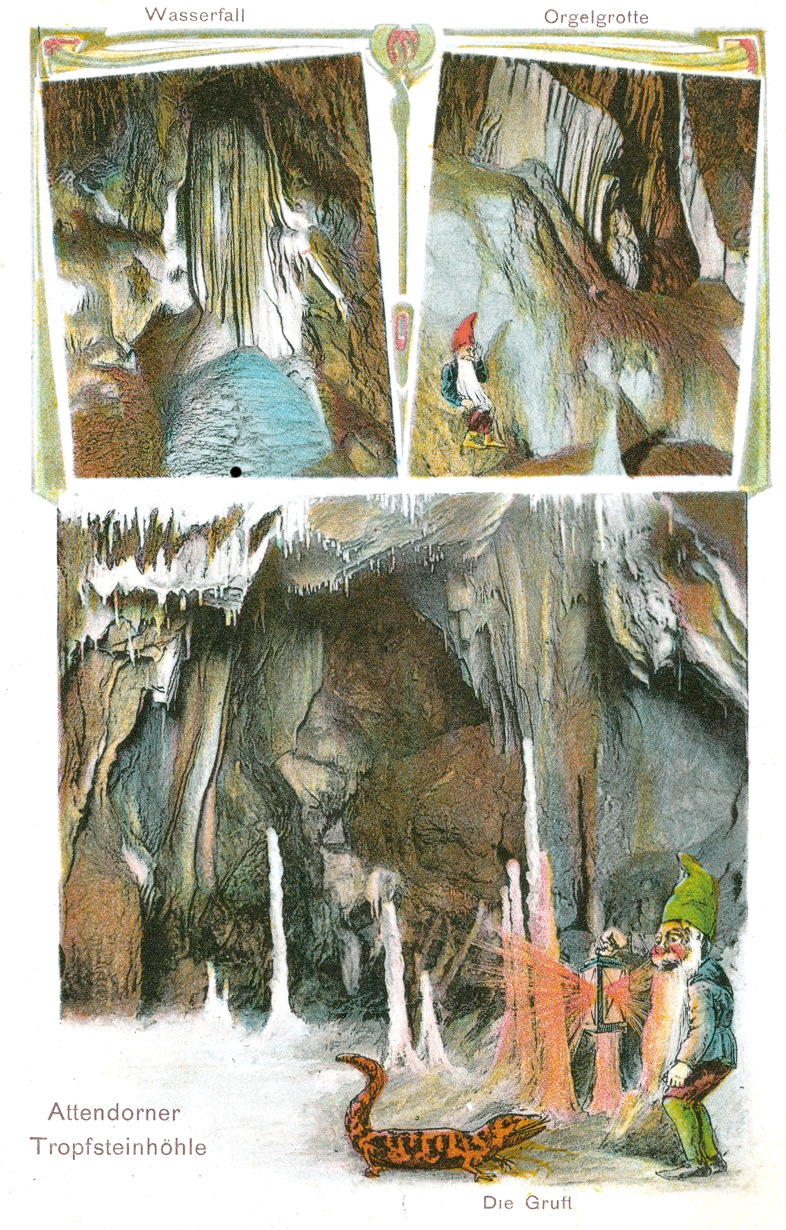
Advertising postcard of 1910

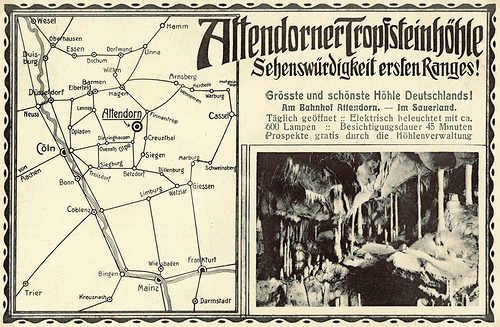
Postcard from the time of its discovery

The formation of the cave started in the Devonian period (about 400 million years ago) when the region of the present-day cave still lay in a bay of the sea. In the layers of limestone then being laid down, caverns were formed over time by carbonic acid weathering caused by the rainwater seeping through it as well as mixed corrosion (Mischungskorrosion).

An earthquake several thousand years ago broke several of the speleothems. The caves are also inhabited by bats that get into the cave through rock crevices in the hilltop.

Other parts of the cave were discovered in 1985 by Elmar Hammerschmidt. The total length of the cave is 6,000 metres but it has not been completely surveyed. For the show cave section there is a roughly 500 m long circular tour. It is reached through a 90 metre long gallery through which visitors are guided. The original entrance is sealed today with a metal door. In one part of the cave, cheese is stored, a water curtain is supposed to help stop the smell spreading too far.

The cave is still in private hands today. It has been criticised for its high entry charges and ban on photography.

== See also ==
- List of show caves in Germany

== Sources ==
- Rainer Ahrweiler, Elmar Hammerschmidt: Attendorner Tropfsteinhöhle. In: Die Höhlen der Attendorn-Elsper Doppelmulde, Karst und Höhle 1991/92, VdHK München, ISSN 0342-2062, pages 25–36
