= List of show caves in Germany =

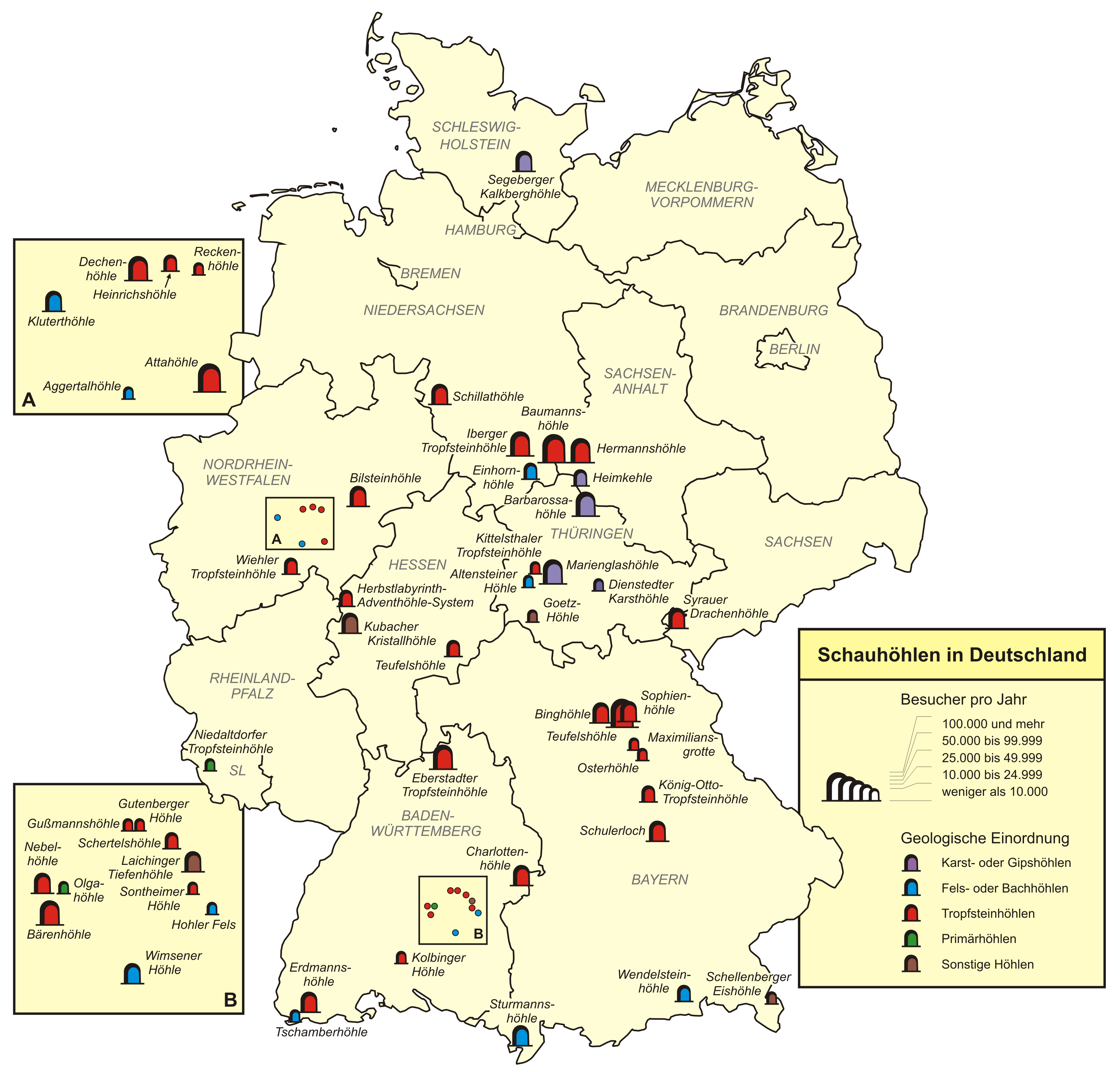
Show caves in Germany

The list of show caves in Germany contains all 51 show caves in Germany which are hosted by the German Speleological Federation. (German: Verband der Deutschen Höhlen- and Karstforscher)

== Background ==
As of 2008, there have been 51 show caves in Germany, which are hosted by the German Speleological Federation (German: Verband der Deutschen Höhlen- and Karstforscher). A show cave is defined as any cave equipped for tourists, by having walkways or steps, fitted with lighting, or supplying gear, as examples. Show caves have regular opening times, usually with regular guided tours of about 30 to 45 minutes duration and are almost all electrically lighted. Only the Easter Cave and the Schellenberg Ice Cave still use carbide lamps. In 1884 the Olga Cave was the first German show cave to be equipped with electrical lighting and the second in the world to be thus fitted. Only the Kraus Cave in the Styria in Austria was equipped earlier, in 1883.

Not included on this list are the artificially created caverns Schlossberg Caves and Saalfeld Fee Grottos, although these are listed with the German Speleological Federation, as their operators are paying members.

Also not in the main list is Balve Cave, because it has no regular guided tours or visits. Included is the Dienstedt Karst Cave, which is not part of the German Speleological Federation, but fulfils all the conditions of a show cave.

The cave which had the first guided tours was Baumann's Cave in the Rübeland; Tours of this cave were organised as early as 1646 and it was visited by Goethe. The latest to be opened as a show cave was the Autumn Labyrinth in 2009.

More than half the show caves are dripstone caves. The Wimsen Cave is the only show cave in Germany accessible by boat, for a distance of 70 metres. The Goetz Cave is the only fissure cave in the list and the largest publicly accessible cave in Europe. The Laichingen Vertical Cave is the only shaft cave that can be viewed in Germany, having a depth of 55 metres below the entrance and reaches the greatest depth of any German show cave. The Schellenberg Ice Cave is the only ice cave in Germany that can be visited. In the Barbarossa Cave, which is formed of anhydrite stone, loose layers of plaster hang like wallpaper from the ceilings and walls.

== Legend ==
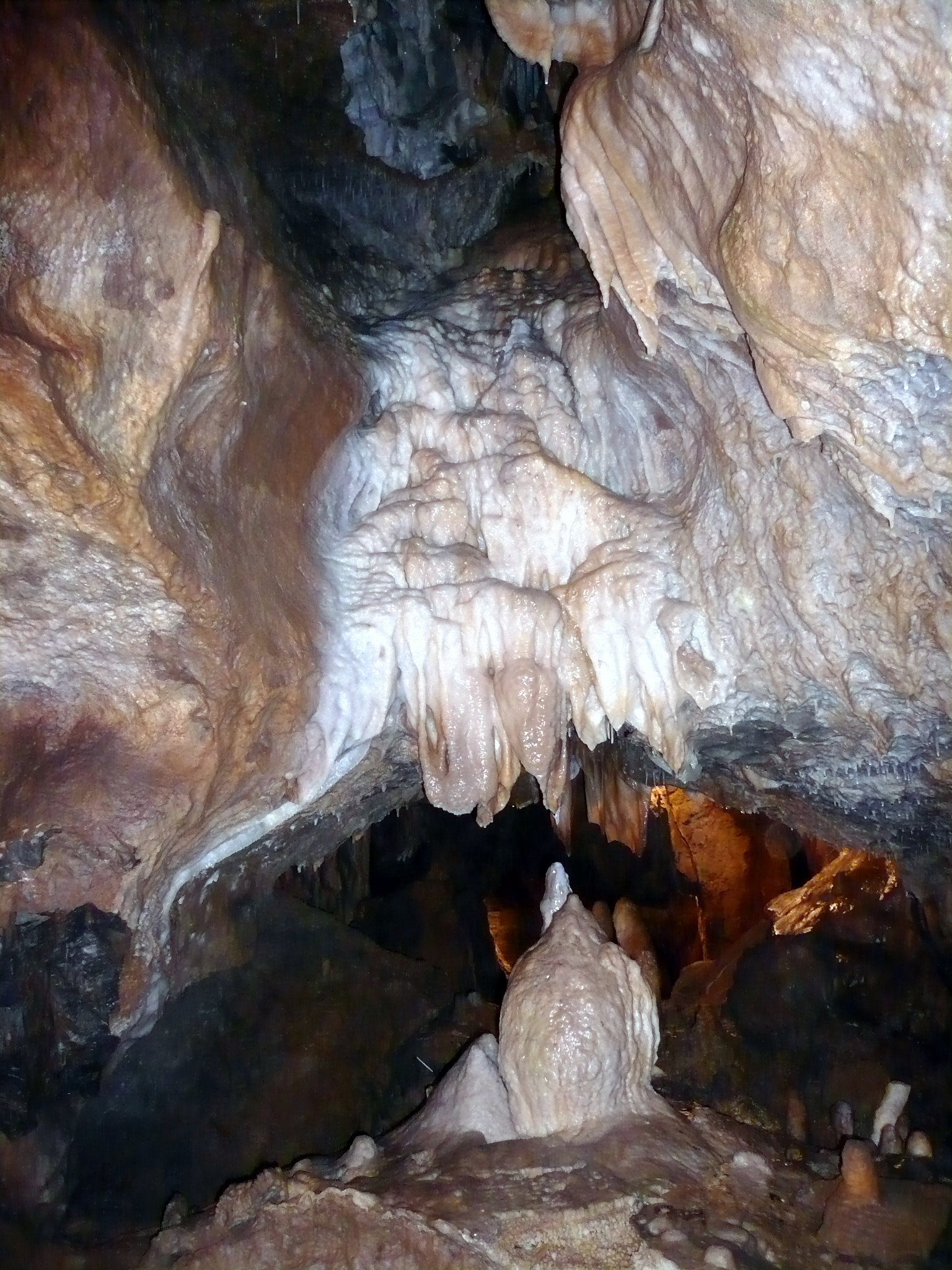
The Atta Cave – Germany’s most-visited show cave

- Name of the show cave : states the name of the show cave.
- Location: gives the location of the show cave.
- State: gives the state in which the show cave is found.

BR
BE
BW
BY
HE

Brandenburg
Berlin
Baden-Württemberg
Bayern
Hesse

MV
NI
NW
RP
SH

Mecklenburg-Vorpommern
Lower Saxony
North Rhine-Westphalia
Rhineland-Palatinate
Schleswig-Holstein

SL
SN
ST
TH

Saarland
Saxony
Saxony-Anhalt
Thuringia

- Location: gives the coordinates of the show caves.
- Geological classification: states the geological type of cave. It may be a limestone cave, rock cave, karst cave or other type.
- Length (m): gives the total length of the show cave in metres including all branches.
- GR (m): gives the total length of the guided route in metres, ignoring any doubling of walkways. It does include any artificial access walkways that are not part of the total length of the cave. So the guided route may be longer than the total length of the cave.
- Height: gives the height of the entrance above sea level.
- Discovery: is the date of discovery of the show cave. Most show caves were known by the local population much earlier, because they sometimes had a natural entrance accessible on foot. In these cases the year the cave is first mentioned in the records is shown in brackets.
- Show caves : gives the start of its operation as a show cave. Subsequent problems with safety, the impact of war, financial issues or changes of owner may have led to long interruptions in its use as a show cave.
- Electr. Light: states the year when electrical lighting was first installed.
- Visitors (annual): gives the latest (2004 to 2008) average, annual visitor numbers. If the number is in brackets it indicates the recent, average number of visitors, over a different, unspecified period.

== Table ==
Name of show cave	Location	State	Location	Geological classification	Len- gth (m)	GR (m)	Height	Dis- cov- ery	Show Cave	Electr. Light	Visi- tors (/yr)
Agger Valley Cave	Engelskirchen	NW	50°59′37.21″N 7°26′59.29″E	Rock cave	1,071	270	200	1773	1930	1930	(5,000)
Altenstein Cave	Schweina	TH	50°49′43″N 10°20′47″E	Rock and active stream cave	1960	280	360	1799	1802	1905	(6,000)
Atta Cave	Attendorn	NW	51.12895°N 7.92348°E	Limestone cave	6,670	560		1907	1907	1907	(350.000)
Autumn Labyrinth	Breitscheid	HE	50°41′16″N 8°12′21″E	Karst cave	5,800	120	417	1993	2009	2009	
Barbarossa Cave	Rottleben	TH	51°22′54″N 11°02′13″E	Karst cave in anhydrite stone	1,100	600	154	1865	1866	1895	(70.000)
Bear's Cave	Sonnenbühl	BW	48°22′15″N 9°12′55″E	Limestone cave	292	271	800	1834	1834	1934	98,500
Baumann's Cave	Rübeland	SA	51°45′18″N 10°50′36″E	Limestone cave	1,980	600	378	1536	1646	1892	89,000
Bilstein Cave	Warstein	NW	51°25′34″N 8°19′24″E	Limestone cave	1,700	450	350	1887	1888	1925	(40.000)
Bing Cave	Streitberg	BY	49°48′44″N 11°13′01″E	Limestone cave	300	300	375	1905	1906	1908	35,800
Charlotte's Cave	Hürben	BW	48°35′14″N 10°12′22″E	Limestone cave	587	532	488	1893	1893	1893	41,900
Dechen Cave	Iserlohn	NW	51°21′56″N 7°38′41″E	Limestone cave	870	360	250	1868	1868	1926	(60.000)
Devil's Cave	Pottenstein	BY	49°45′17″N 11°25′12″E	Limestone cave	1,500	800	400	1922	1923	1923	161,500
Devil's Cave	Steinau	HE	50°20′17.23″N 09°27′17.96″E	Limestone cave	137	174	310	1584	1927	1927	(16,000)
Dienstedt Karst Cave	Dienstedt	TH	50°48′50″N 11°10′28″E	Karst cave	350	155	340	1953	1994	1994	(1,200)
Easter Cave	Trondorf	BY	49°31′08″N 11°39′50″E	Limestone cave	185	130		(1630)	1905	not yet	(5,000)
Eberstadt Stalactite Cave	Eberstadt	BW	49°28′57″N 09°20′52″E	Limestone cave	616	588	341	1971	1973	1973	62,700
Erdmann's Cave	Hasel	BW	47.64916°N 7.89592°E	Limestone cave	2,146	356		(1271)	1773	1899	31,100
Goetz Cave	Meiningen	TH	50°33′54.75″N 10°24′27.37″E	Fissure cave	242	485	328	1915	1934	1934	(15,000)
Gußmann's Cave	Gutenberg	BW	48°32′33.72″N 09°31′11.64″E	Limestone cave	91	55	680	1890	1891	1922	4,400
Gutenberg Cave	Gutenberg	BW	48°32′25.44″N 09°31′13.8″E	Limestone cave	180	110	690	1889	1890	1967	4,400
Heimkehle	Uftrungen	SA	51°29′50.78″N 10°57′17.86″E	Large gypsum karst cave	2,000	750	200	(1357)	1920	1920	(20.000)
Heinrich's Cave	Hemer	NW	51°22′46″N 7°46′26″E	Limestone cave	2,984	300	250	(1771)	1905	1905	(15,000)
Hermann's Cave	Rübeland	SA	51°45′17″N 10°50′50″E	Limestone cave	2,733	800	378	1866	1890	1890	89,000
Hohler Fels	Schelklingen	BW	48°22′45.3″N 09°45′19.9″E	Large rock dome	120	68	534	(1830)	1907	1955	(4,000)
Iberg Dripstone Cave	Bad Grund	NI	51°49′03″N 10°15′10″E	Limestone cave	351	220	434	1723	1874	1912	60.500
Kittelsthal Dripstone Cave	Kittelsthal	TH	50°55′26″N 10°23′31″E	Limestone cave	726	158	348	1888	1896	1918	(6,000)
Klutert Cave	Ennepetal	NW	51°17′57″N 7°21′17″E	Rock cave	5,497	1,080	193	(1586)	1884	1951	44,500
Kolbing Cave	Kolbingen	BW	48°2′25″N 8°55′5″E	Limestone cave	330	88	790	(1879)	1913	1950	(7,500)
König-Otto Dripstone Cave	Velburg	BY	49°15′17″N 11°41′24″E	Limestone cave	450	270	590	1895	1896	1954	20.700
Kubacher Kristall Cave	Kubach	HE	50°28′16″N 08°17′45″E	Crystal filled crevice cave	200	350	231	1974	1981	1981	(40.000)
Laichingen Vertical Cave	Laichingen	BW	48°28′43″N 09°41′31″E	Shaft (vertical cave)	1,253	320	780	1892	1920	1936	(35,000)
Marienglas Cave (Note: Marienglas Cave – a former mine with a natural cavern, the so-called Gipskristalldruse or Crystal Grotto (Kristallgrotte). This crystal grotto is the main attraction of the mine, which is why it is viewed more as a show cave. – Although the literature overwhelmingly sees it as a show cave, it calls itself a show mine.)	Friedrichroda	TH	50°51′48.51″N 10°32′32.14″E	Large gypsum crystal geode	300	122	450	1784	1903	1929	(75,000)
Maximilian's Grotto	Krottensee	BY	49.6285°N 11.5884°E	Limestone cave	1,200	400	500	(1596)	1878	1994	(20.000)
Nebel Cave	Sonnenbühl	BW	48°25′1″N 9°13′15″E	Limestone cave	813	450	808	(1486)	1803	1922	49,900
Niedaltdorf Dripstone Cave	Niedaltdorf	SL	49°20′22.4″N 6°35′42.5″E	Primary cave in tufa	200	80		1880	1933	1933	
Olga Cave	Honau	BW	48°24′36″N 9°15′35″E	Primary cave in tufa (Note: Tufa caves (tuff caves) are a special type of cave. Tufa forms wherever springs rise to the surface with calcium in the water. In the deposited limestone, overhangs and half-caves can occur, until further tufa deposits lead to entirely enclosed caverns.)	170	90	557	1874	1884	1884	
Recken Cave	Balve	NW	51°22′13″N 7°51′49″E	Limestone cave	450	300	220	1888	1890	1890	(15,000)
Schellenberg Ice Cave	Marktschellenberg	BY	47°42′48″N 13°00′16″E	Ice cave	3,621	500	1,570	(1826)	1925	not yet	(9,000)
Schertel's Cave	Westerheim	BW	48°32′05″N 09°35′18″E	Limestone cave	212	160	775	(1470)	1902	1953	(15,000)
Schillat Cave	Oldendorf	NI	52°12′17″N 9°17′17″E	Limestone cave	340	305		1992	2004	2004	(32,000)
Schulerloch	Essing	BY	48°55′40″N 11°49′01″E	Limestone cave	420	180	390	(1782)	1828	1953	(50.000)
Segeberg Kalkberg Cave	Bad Segeberg	SH	53°56′7.75″N 10°19′3.8″E	Gypsum karst cave	2,260	400		1913	1919	1919	(35,000)
Sontheim Cave	Sontheim	BW	48.43506°N 09.684101°E	Limestone cave	530	192	720	(1488)	1516	1957	(4,000)
Sophie's Cave	Ahorntal	BY	49°49′36.9″N 11°22′33.0″E	Limestone cave	900	220	405	1833	1834	1971	(30.000)
Sturmann's Cave	Obermaiselstein	BY	47°26′12″N 10°14′8″E	Active stream cave	460	287	978	(1815)	1905	1905	(30.000)
Dragon's Cave	Syrau	SN	50°32′34.71″N 12°04′56.09″E	Limestone cave	550	350	460	1928	1928	1928	(45,000)
Tschamber Cave	Karsau	BW	47°35′18″N 07°49′07.5″E	Active stream cave	1,550	600		1890	1890	1966	
Unicorn Cave	Scharzfeld	NI	51°38′06.05″N 10°24′14.59″E	Large rock cave	610	270	370	(1541)	1895	1928	(15,000)
Wendelstein Cave	Brannenburg	BY	47°42′12″N 12°0′47″E	Alpine rock cave	523	170	1,711	1864	1921	1962	(30.000)
Wiehle Dripstone Cave	Wiehl	NRW	50°56′18″N 07°32′53″E	Limestone cave	868	400	260	1860	1927	1927	(26,000)
Wimsener Höhle	Hayingen	BW	48°15′23.4″N 09°26′53.52″E	Water cave	723	70	557	(1447)	1803	1927	(35,000)

== Disputed caves ==
Several caves are sometimes described in the literature as show caves, although they do not meet the criteria. These include the Saalfeld Fairy Grottoes and Schlossberg Caves which are not natural caverns, but mines, and the Zwiefaltendorf Limestone Cave and the Balve Cave, which have no regular guided tours.

Name of show cave	Location	State	Geological classification	Len- gth (m)	GR (m)	Dis- cov- ery	Show- Cave	Electr. Light	Visi- tors (/yr)
Balve Cave	Balve	NRW	Large rock cave	138	138	(1690)			
Morassina	Schmiedefeld	TH	Dripstone filled show mine	2000	tbd.	1683	1993	1993	tbd.
Saalfeld Fairy Grottoes (Note: Saalfeld Fairy Grottoes – A former mine, in the shafts of which wonderfully colourful dripstone has formed. – Sometimes described in the literature as show caves and sometimes as a show mine and is a paying member of the German Speleological Federation. Refers to itself as a show mine.)	Saale	TH	Dripstone filled show mine	1100	600	1913	1914	1914	175,000
Schlossberg Caves (Note: Schlossberg Caves – Galleries cut through Bunter sandstone by human effort, so that it is more like a mine. – Mainly described in the literature as show caves and a member of the German Speleological Federation. Refers to itself as a mine shaft.)	Homburg	SL	Mine in Bunter sandstone	5000	800	(1708)	1930	1935	33,500
Zwiefaltendorf Limestone Cave (Note: The cave may only be visited in combination with a visit to the restaurant. It is shown in the literature occasionally as a show cave, but is not listed by the German Speleological Federation.)	Zwiefaltendorf	BW	Primary cave in tufa	27	27	1892	1892		

== Gallery ==
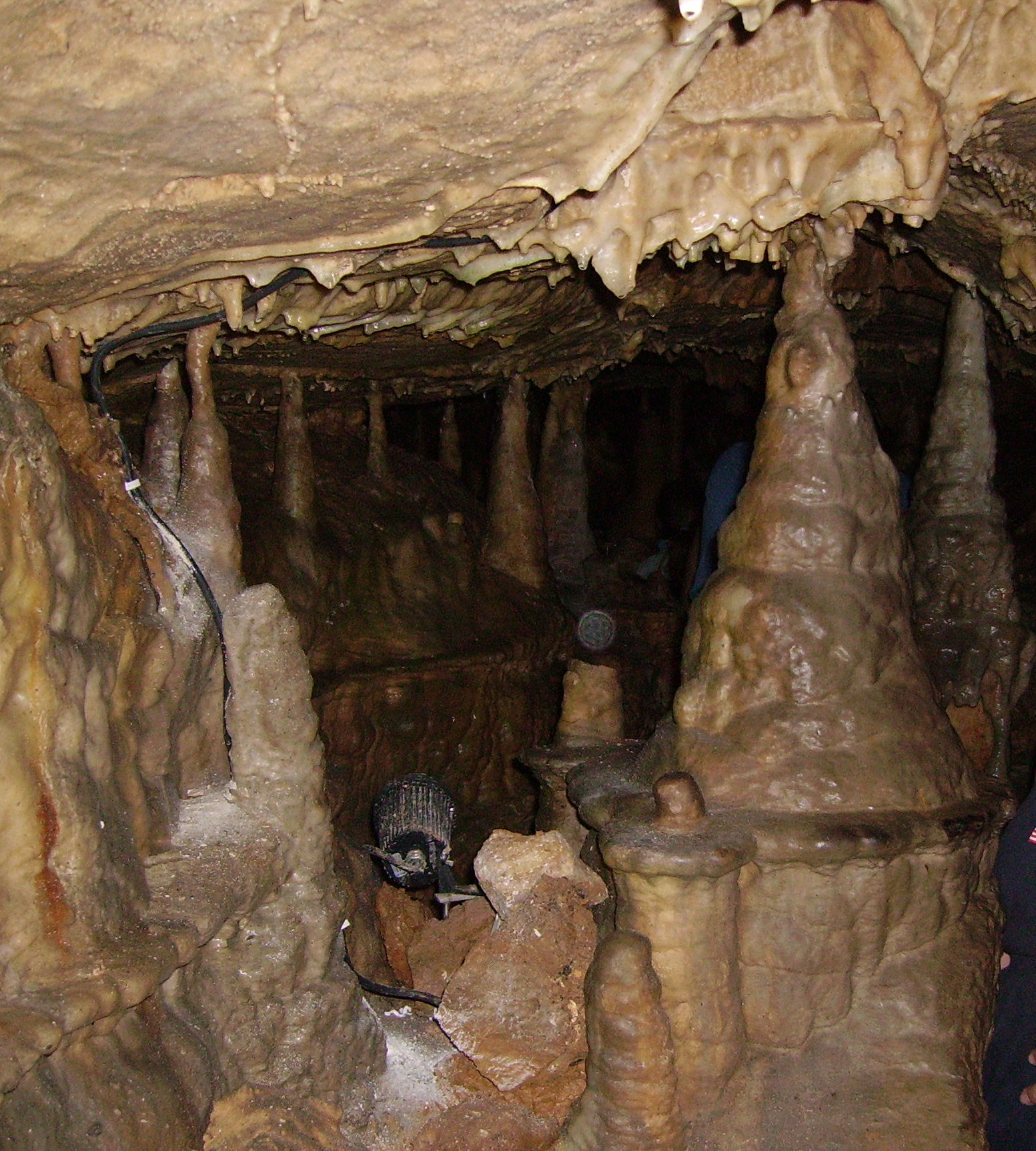
Stalagmites in the Bing Cave

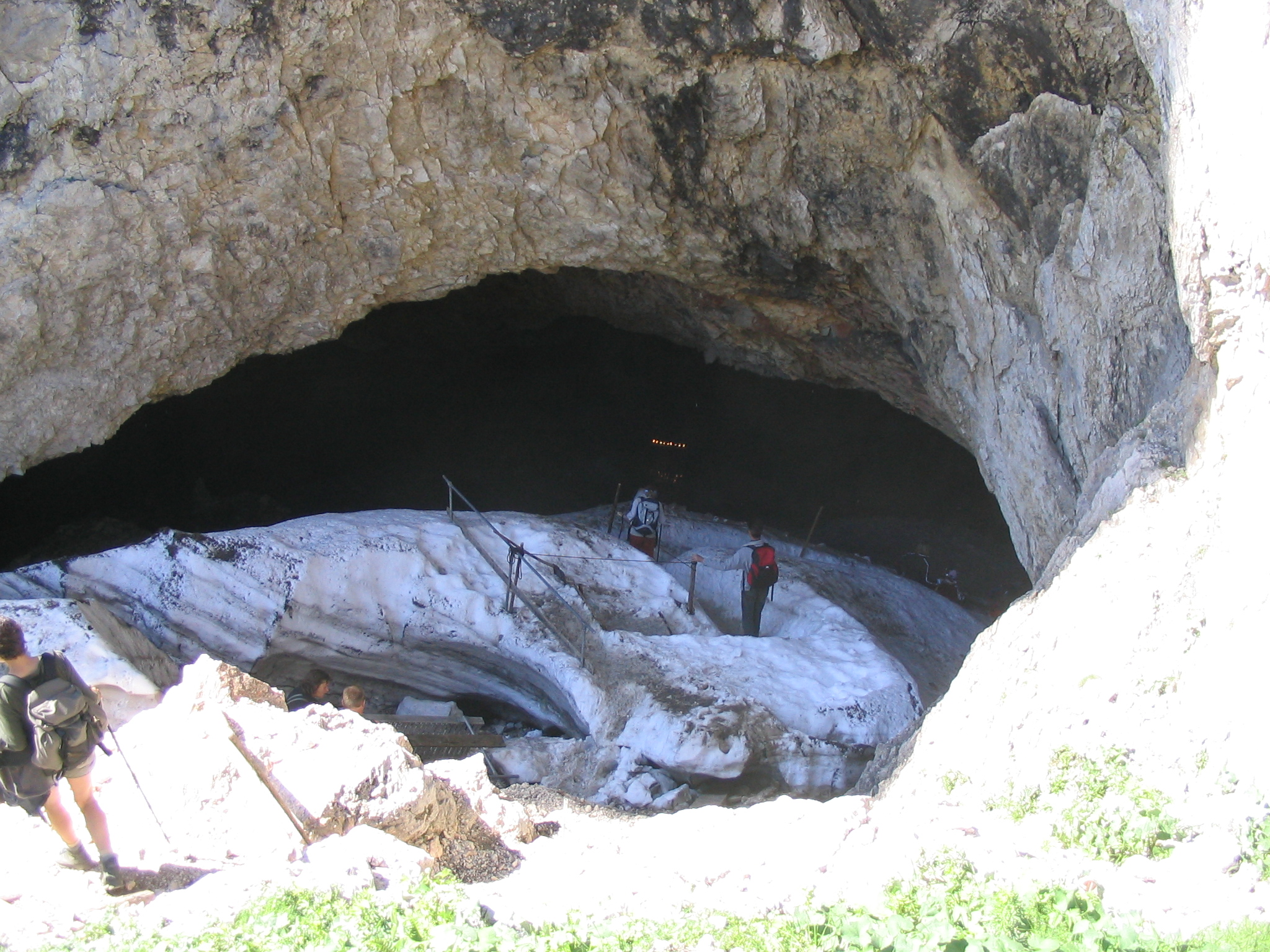
Entrance area of the Schellenberg Ice Cave

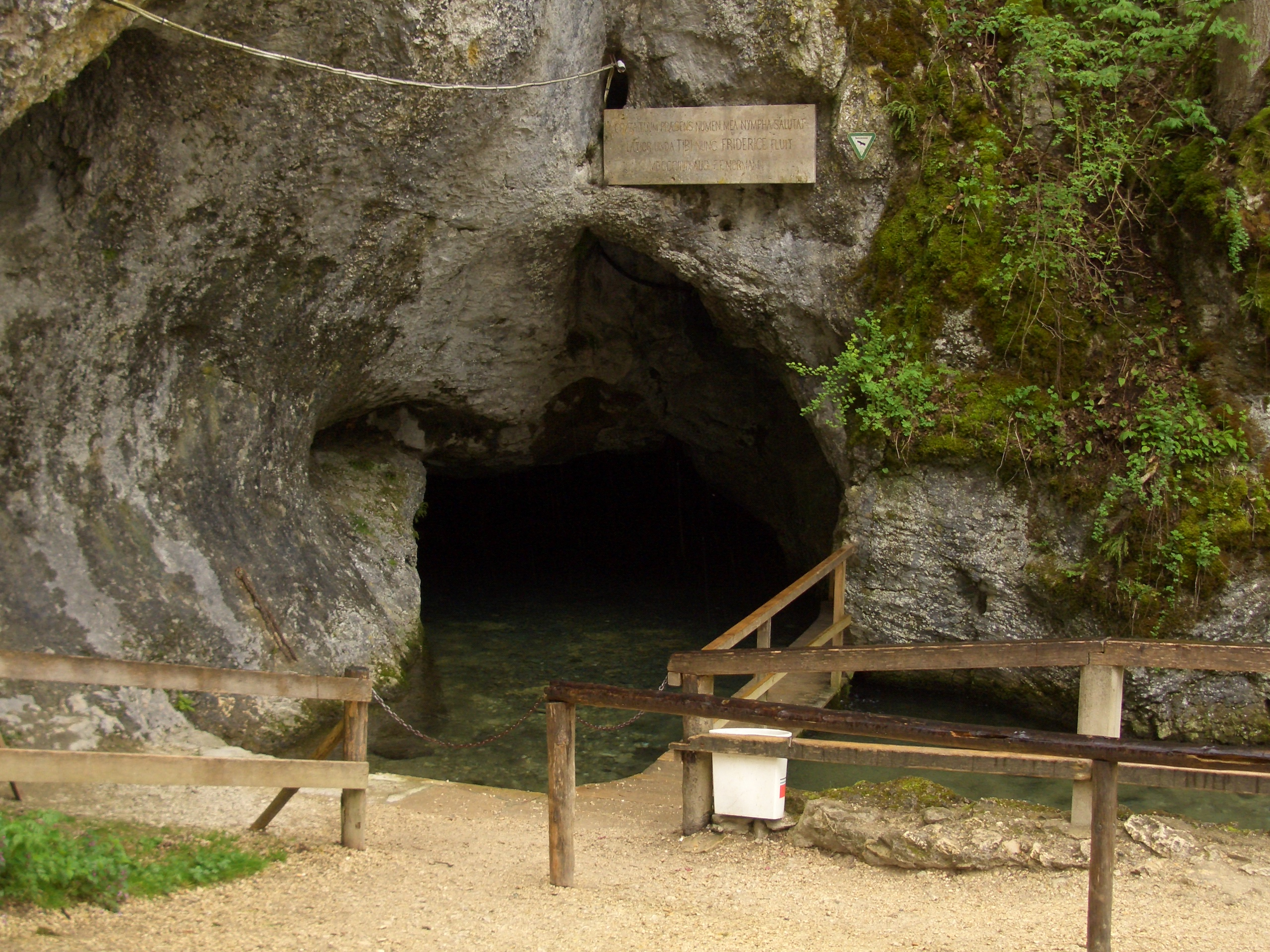
Entrance to the Wimsen Cave

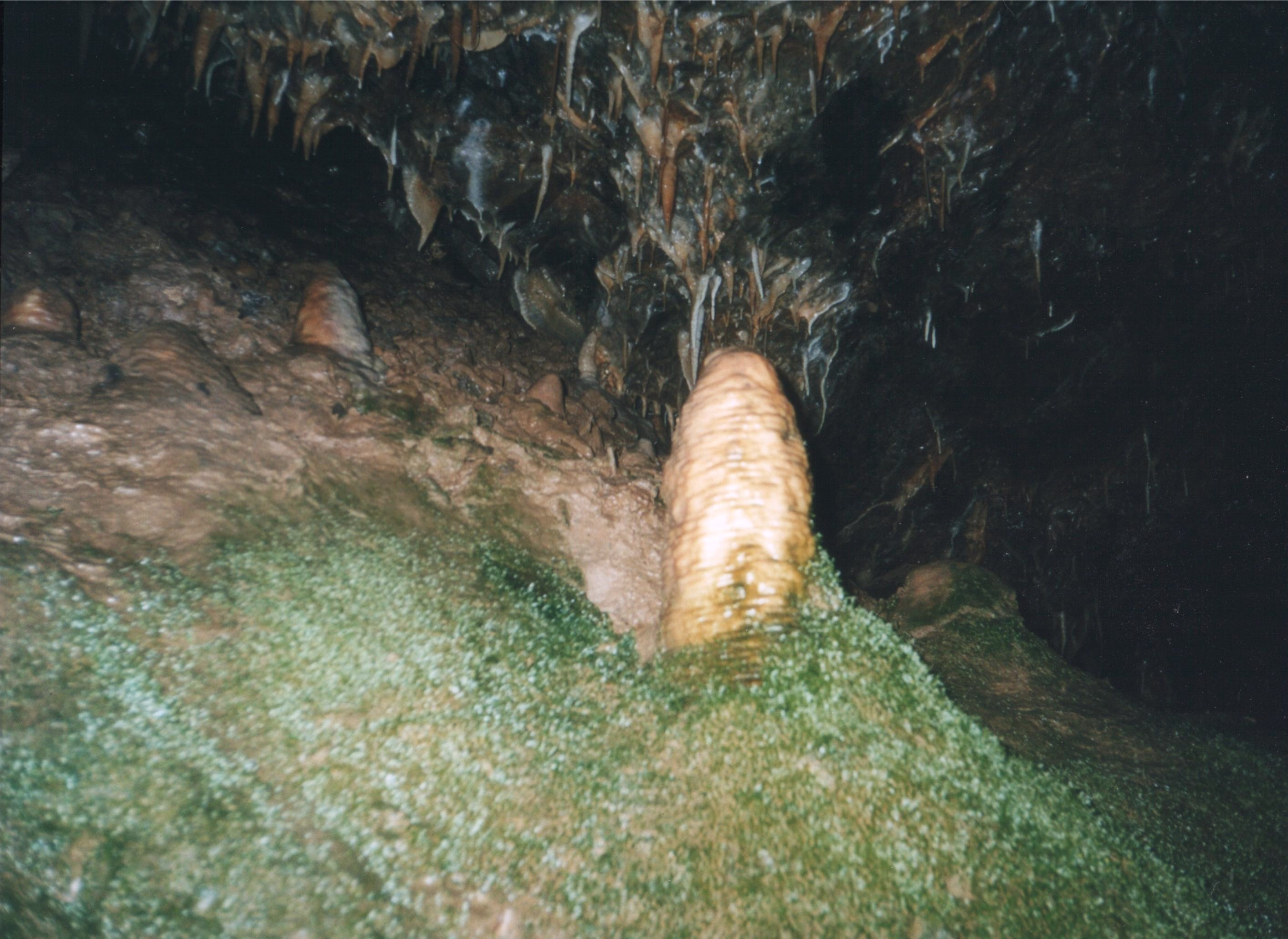
Syrauer Dragon Cave

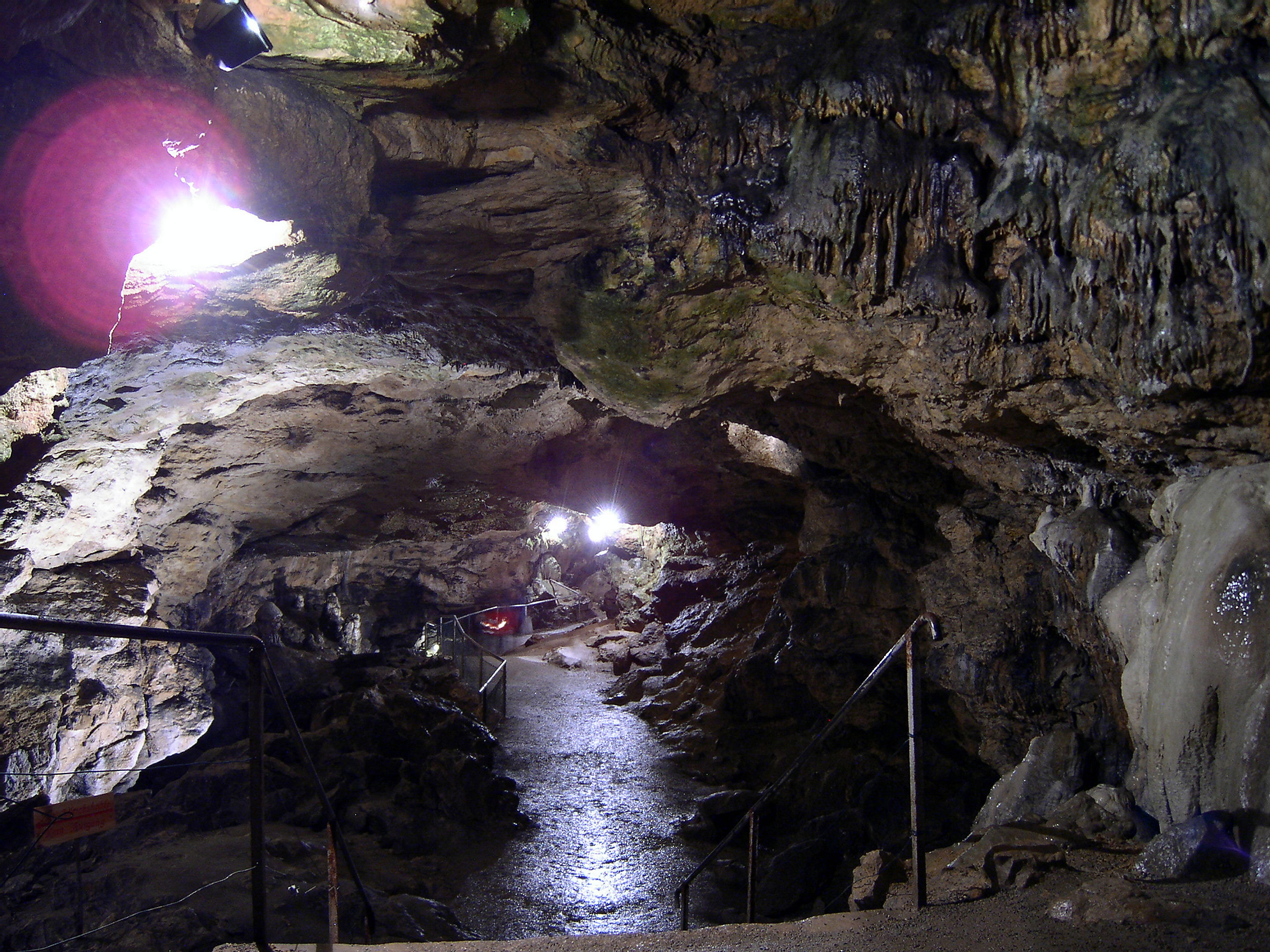
The Nebel Cave

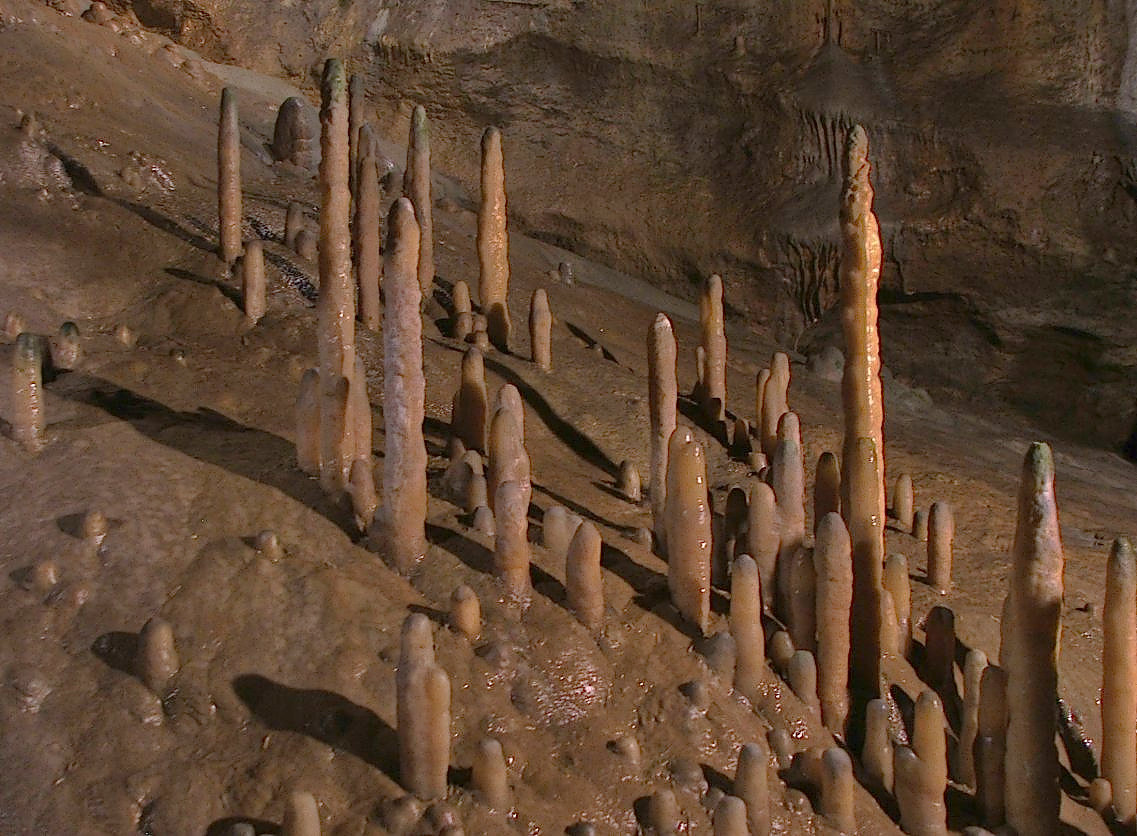
Stalagmite group in the Teufel's Cave near Pottenstein

== See also ==
- Cave
- List of caves
- Speleology

== Bibliography ==
- Ernst Waldemar Bauer: Wunderwelt der Höhlen. Hrsg. v. Bechtle Verlag, Esslingen 2001 ISBN 3-7628-0565-2
- Stephan Kempe, Wilfried Rosendahl: Höhlen – Verborgene Welten. Primus Verlag, Stuttgart 2008 ISBN 978-3-89678-611-1
- Hans Binder, Anke Lutz, Hans Martin Lutz: Schauhöhlen in Deutschland. Hrsg. v. Aegis Verlag, Ulm 1993 ISBN 3-87005-040-3
- Stephan Kempe Welt voller Geheimnisse – Höhlen. Reihe: HB Bildatlas Sonderausgabe. Hrsg. v. HB Verlags- and Vertriebs-Gesellschaft, 1997 ISBN 3-616-06739-1
- Hans Binder: Herbert Jantschke: Höhlenführer Schwäbische Alb. Hrsg. v. DRW-Verlag, Leinefelden-Echterdingen 2003 ISBN 3-87181-485-7
- Hans Binder: Höhlen der Schwäbischen Alb. Hrsg. v. DRW-Verlag, Leinefelden-Echterdingen 1995 ISBN 3-87181-366-4
- Friedrich Herrmann: Höhlen der Fränkischen and Hersbrucker Schweiz. Hrsg. v. Verlag Hans Carl, Nürnberg 1991 ISBN 3-418-00356-7
- Friedhart Knolle, Wilhelm Marbach: Bergwerke & Höhlen im Harz. Hrsg. v. Studio Volker Schadach, Goslar 1998 ISBN 3-928728-24-5
- Stephan Lang: Höhlen in Franken. Wanderführer in die Unterwelt der Fränkischen Schweiz mit neuen Touren. Hrsg. v. Fachverlag Hans Carl, Nürnberg 2006 ISBN 978-3-418-00385-6
- Stephan Lang: Höhlen in Franken. Ein Wanderführer in die Unterwelt der Hersbrucker Schweiz und des Oberpfälzer Jura. Hrsg. v. Verlag Hans Carl, Nürnberg 2002 ISBN 3-418-00390-7
- Hardy Schabdach: Unterirdische Welten, Höhlen der Fränkischen- und Hersbrucker Schweiz. Hrsg. v. Verlag Reinhold Lippert, Ebermannstadt 2000 ISBN 3-930125-05-6
- Helmut Seitz: Schaubergwerke, Höhlen und Kavernen in Bayern. Hrsg. Rosenheimer Verlagshaus, Rosenheim 1993 ISBN 3-475-52750-2
- Volker Sklenar, K. R. Hoffmann, I. Pustal, G. Kuhn, M. Meissner, A. Nestler, R. Cebulla, R. Fohlert, J. Bodenstein, G. Holzhey: Thuringia Untertage. Hrsg. v. Thüringer Landesanstalt für Umwelt und Geologie, Jena 2006 ISBN 3-9806811-4-9
