= Hermann's Cave =

Coordinates: 51°45′17″N 10°50′50″E

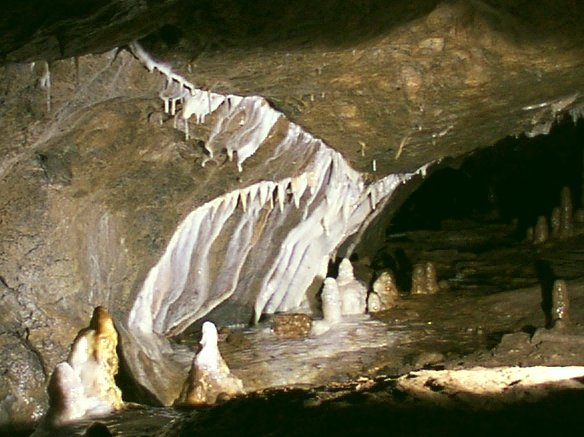
Calc-sinter in the rear areas of the cave

Hermann's Cave (German: Hermannshöhle), together with Baumann's Cave, is one of two show caves in the village of Rübeland near the town of Wernigerode, in the district of Harz, Saxony-Anhalt, Germany.

The cave was formed out of the Devonian limestone of the Elbingerode (Harz) complex during the shaping of the Bode Valley. It was discovered in 1866 during road works and was soon opened up to visitors. As a result of being protected early on its rich dripstone stalactites and stalagmites have been largely preserved.

The cave is well known for, amongst other things, the discovery of numerous bones of cave bears, cave wolves and cave hyenas. The cave was comprehensively surveyed by J. H. Klooß, Robert Nehring (1888) and Dr. Ing. Friedrich Stolberg (1932). Progressive exploration since 1970 has uncovered and surveyed previously unknown chambers.

== See also ==
- Olm - a species of cave salamander
- List of show caves in Germany

== Bibliography ==
- Diedrich, Cajus G. (2017). Famous Planet Earth Caves: Hermann's Cave (Germany) – A Late Pleistocene Cave Bear Den. Famous Planet Earth Caves Volume 2. Vol. 2. Bentham Books. doi:10.2174/97816810853021170201. ISBN 978-1-68108-531-9. ISSN 2405-7215.
