= Devil's Cave (Pottenstein) =

Cave in Germany

- Teufelshöhle
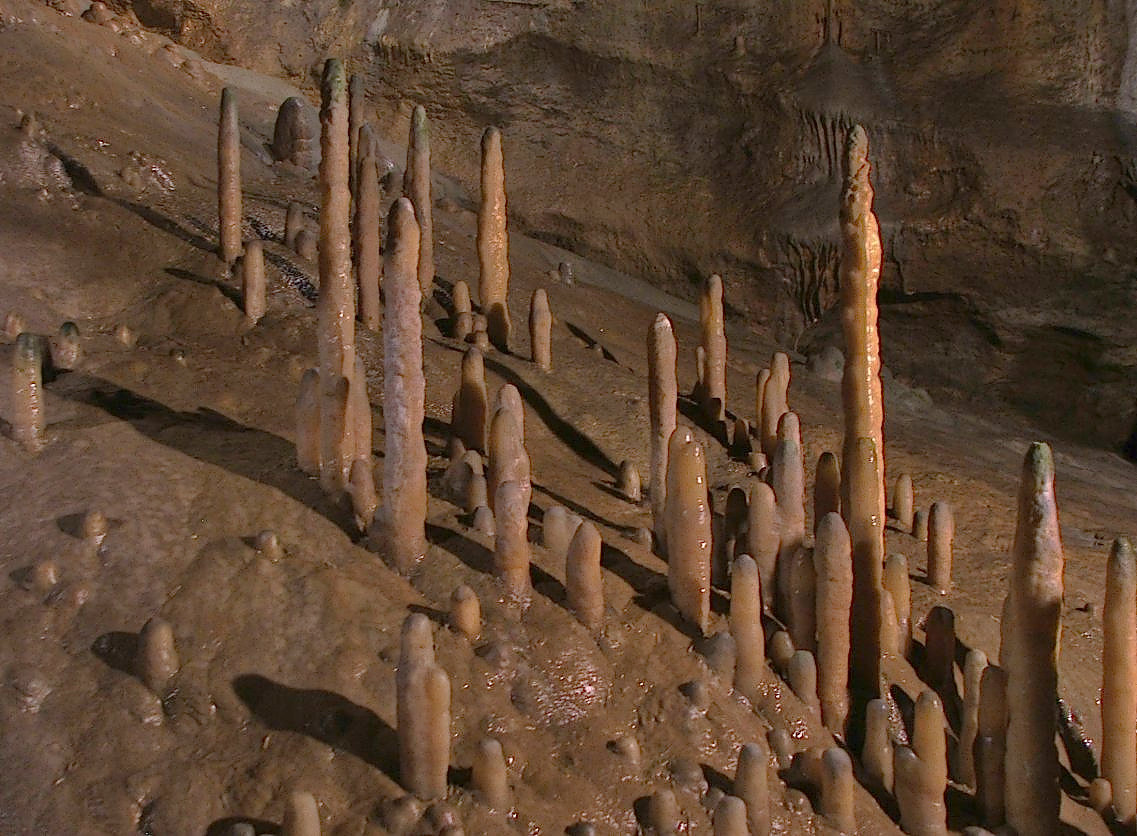
- Stalagmite group in the Barbarosa chamber
- Interactive map of Devil's Cave
- Location: Franconian Switzerland, Germany
- Coordinates: 49°45′17″N 11°25′12″E
- Length: 3000 m
- Elevation: 400 m
- Discovery: 1922
- Geology: Franconian dolomite of the Malm Delta of the Jura
- Show cave opened: 1923
- Show cave length: 800 m
- Lighting: electric
- Visitors: 161,500 (2004–2008)
- Website: Official site

The Devil's Cave (German: Teufelshöhle) is a dripstone cave located in the town of Pottenstein, Bavaria, Germany. The cave is 1,500 metres (4,900 ft), the largest in Franconian Switzerland.

== History ==
The cave as it is today was discovered in 1922 but has been known to locals for many years. The cave is named for the disappearance of livestock in the vicinity of the cave being attributed to the Devil. Centuries later, after the cave had been fully explored, the missing livestock as well as numerous other animals including deer and cave bears were discovered to have fallen into the cave and died. One of these cave bear skeletons has been reconstructed and can be seen on the tour of the cave.

== Visiting ==
The cave offers guided tours year round in both German and English although the opening hours vary by season. The cave tour takes about an hour to complete and the guides stop occasionally to explain the history of the particular chamber and to describe the rock formations. Some of these formations have been named by the guides such as the Turtle, Pipe Organ, and the Crucifixion. Any tour can become English language tours if visitors simply ask the tour guide on any tour to switch on loudspeakers with English explanations (no fee).

Nordic walking trails pass by both the entrance and exit of the cave and network into the surrounding area. These trails provide views of the Weiherbach Valley in which the cave lies as well as the numerous rock faults and stone formations that litter the area. Rainbow and brown trout can be seen and fed in the river at the entrance of the cave.

== Cave therapy ==
There is an operational therapeutic station located inside the cave intended to assist in the treatment of lung ailments with speleotherapy.

== See also ==
- List of show caves in Germany
