= Baumann's Cave =

Cave and archaeological site in Germany

- Baumannshöhle
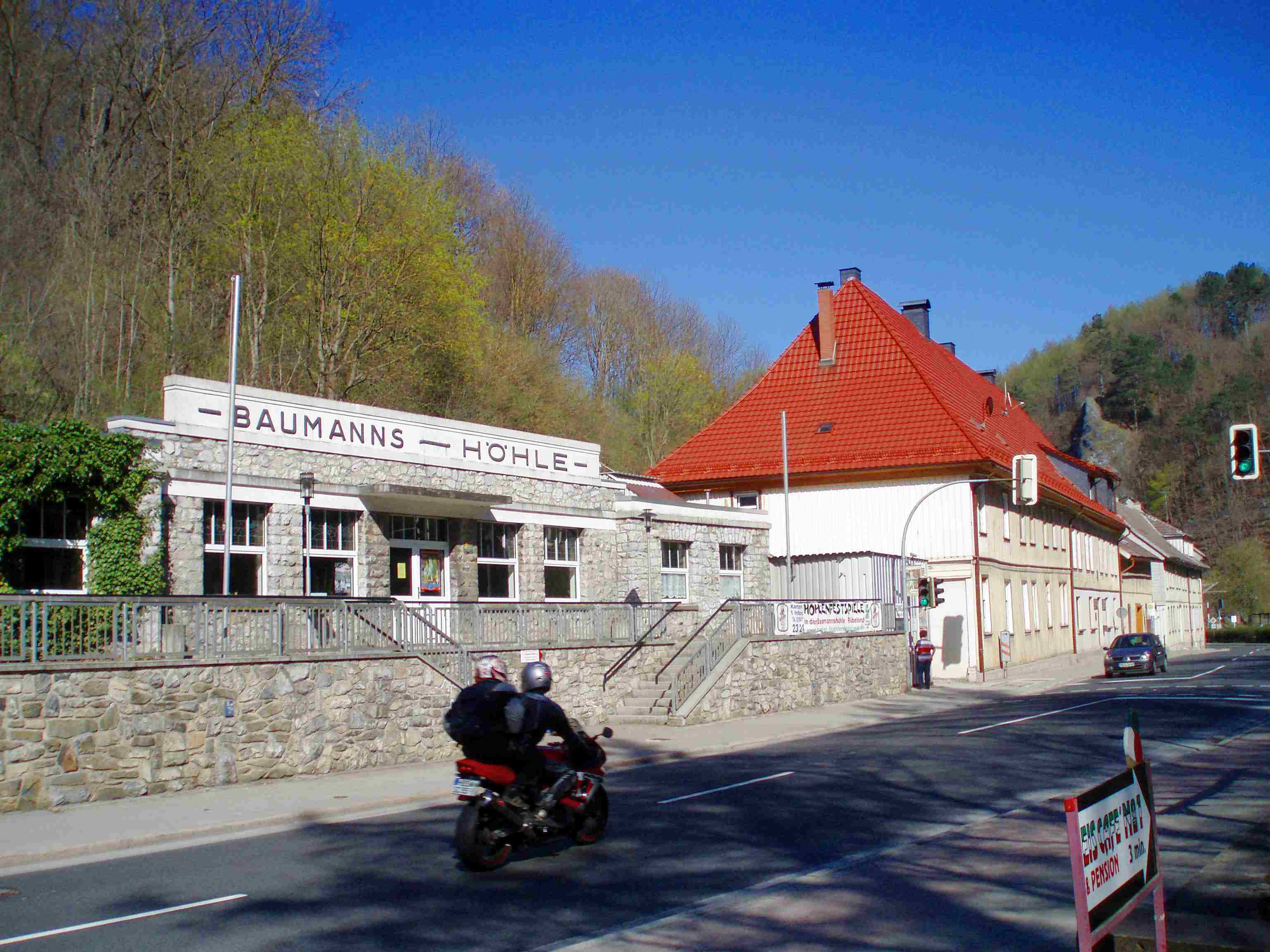
- Entrance to Baumann's Cave
- Interactive map of Baumann's Cave
- Location: Harz mountains, Germany
- Coordinates: 51°45′18″N 10°50′36″E
- Length: 1,980 metres (6,500 ft)
- Discovery: 1536
- Geology: Dripstone cave
- Show cave opened: 1646
- Show cave length: 600 metres (2,000 ft)
- Lighting: Electric (since 1892)
- Visitors: 89,000 (2004–2008)
- Features: One of the oldest show caves in the world

Baumann's Cave (German: Baumannshöhle), located nearby Hermann's Cave, is a show cave in Rübeland in the district of Harz and is Germany's oldest show cave.

The grotto was formed in the Devonian limestone of the Elbingerode Complex at least since the Bode Valley was being shaped. The cave has been visited by man since the Stone Age and not first discovered in 1536 as many written accounts suggest. The year of discovery in 1536 in combination with the tale of the miner, Baumann, who is supposed to have discovered the cave, are part of a false story dating back to Nazi times when a politically suitable jubilee date was being sought.

The cave is frequently mentioned in the early scientific and travel literature as it has been open to the public with guided tours since 1649 when Valentin Wagner was installed as first cave guide. Baumann's Cave is probably the oldest regularly frequented and guided show cave, at least in Germany. Amongst its most famous visitors was Johann Wolfgang von Goethe. The cave's biggest chamber, the Goethesaal, is named after him and is fitted with seats and a stage for concerts and plays.

The cave was sealed off from an early date so that its rich display of stalactites and stalagmites has been largely preserved. The cave is particularly famous for, amongst other things, the numerous bones of cave bears that have been found there.

== See also ==
- List of show caves in Germany
