= Iberg (Harz) =

Mountain in Lower Saxony, Germany

Coordinates: 51°49′14″N 10°14′58″E

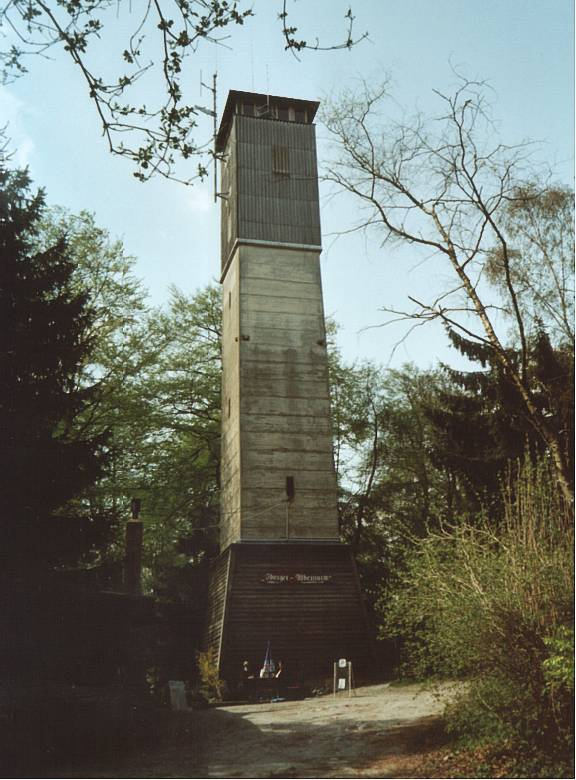
The Iberg's Albert Tower

The Iberg is a hill, 563 m above sea level, in the western Harz mountains in the German state of Lower Saxony.

It lies north of Bad Grund, above the Harz High Road. The Iberg is an old coral reef that emerged in the Givetian/Frasnian (Devonian) stages, that was created as an atoll in the middle of the ocean, probably from the base of a volcano. The reef was mainly built by corals und stromatoporoidea. Later, as the Frasnian transitioned into the Famennian, these reef-building organisms died out leaving the reef unfinished. During the Famennian and Mississippian crevices emerged that were filled with crinoid, brachiopod und goniatite chalks.

The Iberg is made entirely of limestone and karstification has resulted in numerous caves. One of these, the Iberg Dripstone Cave is open to the public through guided tours. In the immediate vicinity is the Hübichenstein. On the northwestern slopes of the Iberg is a large limestone quarry and a lime works.

On the summit is the Albert Tower (Iberger Albertturm) and a restaurant for day trippers. There is also a checkpoint (no. 130) for the Harzer Wandernadel. The Iberger Kaffeehaus on the northern slope was a popular restaurant and was also referred to as Bad Grund's Balcony (Balkon Bad Grunds). However it was the victim of arson on 28 February 2000 and has since fallen into rack and ruin.

== See also ==
- List of mountains and hills in Lower Saxony
