= Saalfeld Fairy Grottoes =

Coordinates: 50°38′06″N 11°20′29″E

- Feengrotten
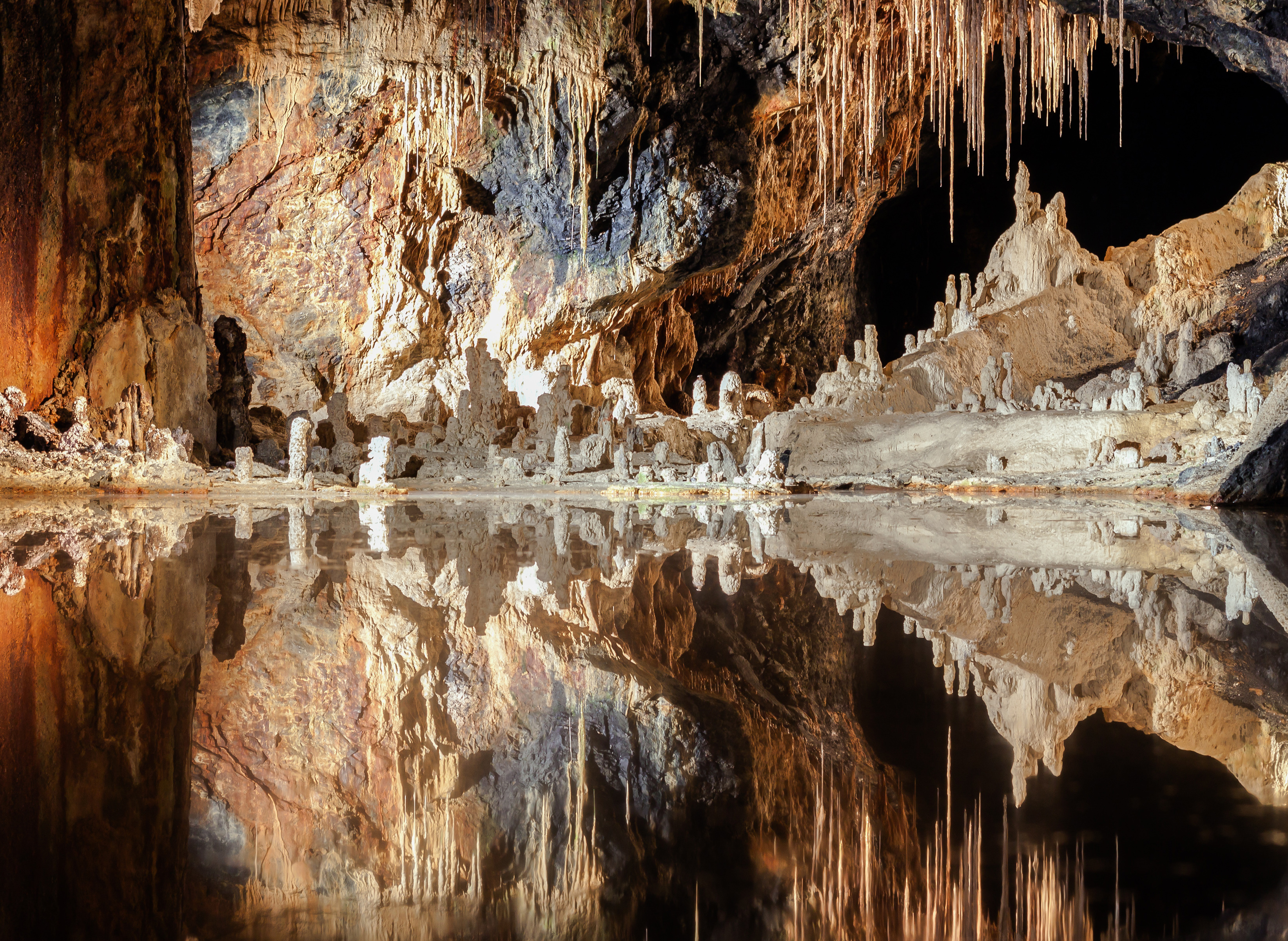
- "Fairy Kingdom" (Märchendom) in the Saalfeld Feengrotten.

- Location within Germany Location within Thuringia
- Location: Saalfeld, Thuringia, Germany
- Discovery: 1910
- Geology: Alum
- Access: public
- Lighting: electric
- Website: en.feengrotten.de

The Saalfeld Fairy Grottoes (in German: Saalfelder Feengrotten) are caverns or grottoes of a former mine near Saalfeld, in the German state of Thuringia.

They have long been famous for their countless colorful mineral formations (speleothems) formed over many years by water dripping through relatively soft rock. Since 1993, the Guinness Book of World Records has termed the Feengrotten "the most colorful cave grottoes in the world".

== Extent ==
The caverns consist of three chambers connected by galleries. In the first chamber, information is presented about the history of the mine — in the 16th to 19th centuries an alum shale mine that was closed in 1850 but opened for sightseeing in 1914. The historical background includes information about environmental radiation treatments formerly offered there until such treatments were found to be hazardous.

In the second chamber is found the source of the mineral-laden water that formed colorful stalagmites, stalactites and other shapes over the centuries. The third chamber contains the famed "Fairy Kingdom" (Märchendom), featuring a variegated grouping of deposits that, illuminated by theatrical lights and reflected in a perfectly still pool of water, is thought to resemble miniature castles and other buildings.

== History ==
Historically, alum was employed in a range of medicinal products, as a food preservative, to clarify water and to finish cloth. However, in the 19th century more effective chemical compounds were developed, and alum ceased to be a profitable mining product. By the 20th century, the Feengrotten had been largely forgotten. But in 1910 the old mine was rediscovered and explorers took note of the fantastic mineral deposits that had accumulated over the geologically short period of three centuries.

In 1913 the third chamber with the "Fairy Kingdom" was discovered, and shortly before the outbreak of World War I in 1914 tours began to be offered to the public. At that time a pavilion with café was opened that remained in use in the following decades — including the post-World War II German Democratic Republic, which categorized the Feengrotten as an official Sehenswürdigkeit (point of Interest) of the GDR, open to foreign tourists. Following German unification, the pavilion was renovated beginning in 1998, and new facilities were added.

Between 1914 and 2007, more than 20 million people visited the grottoes, which annually draw an average of 160,000 visitors.

== Gallery ==
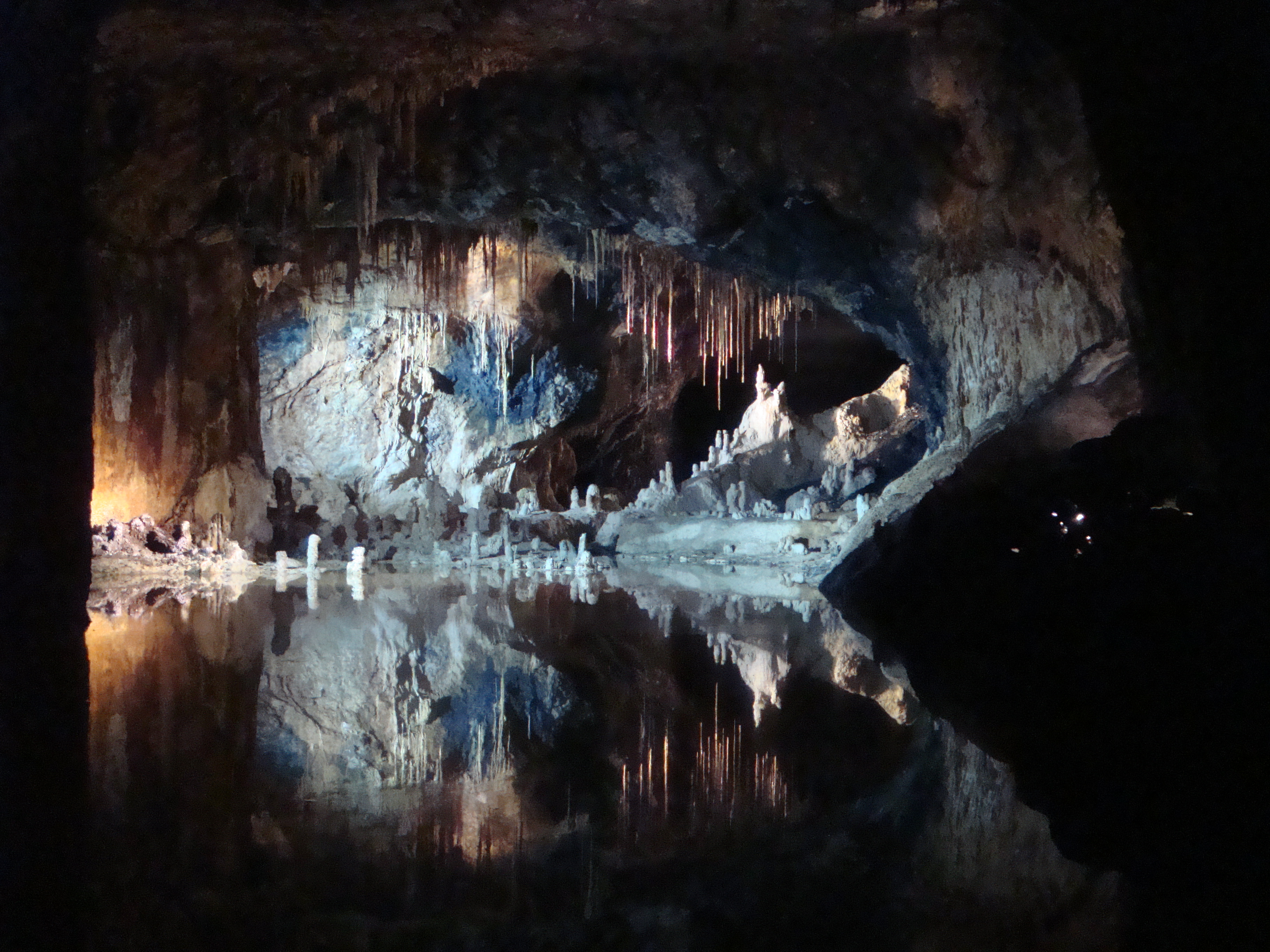

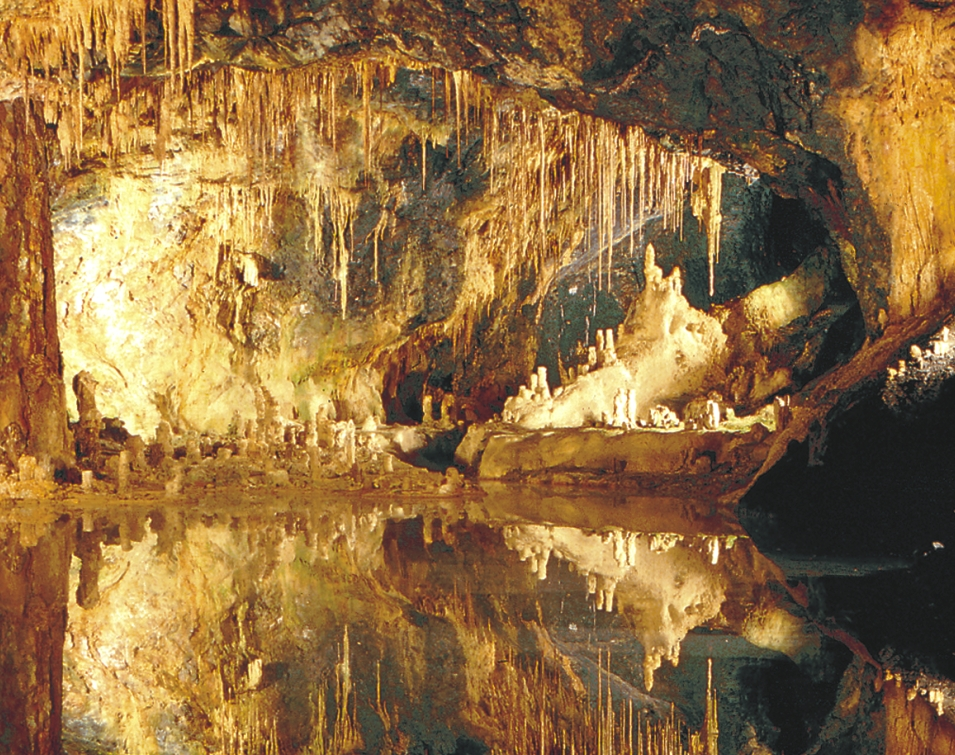

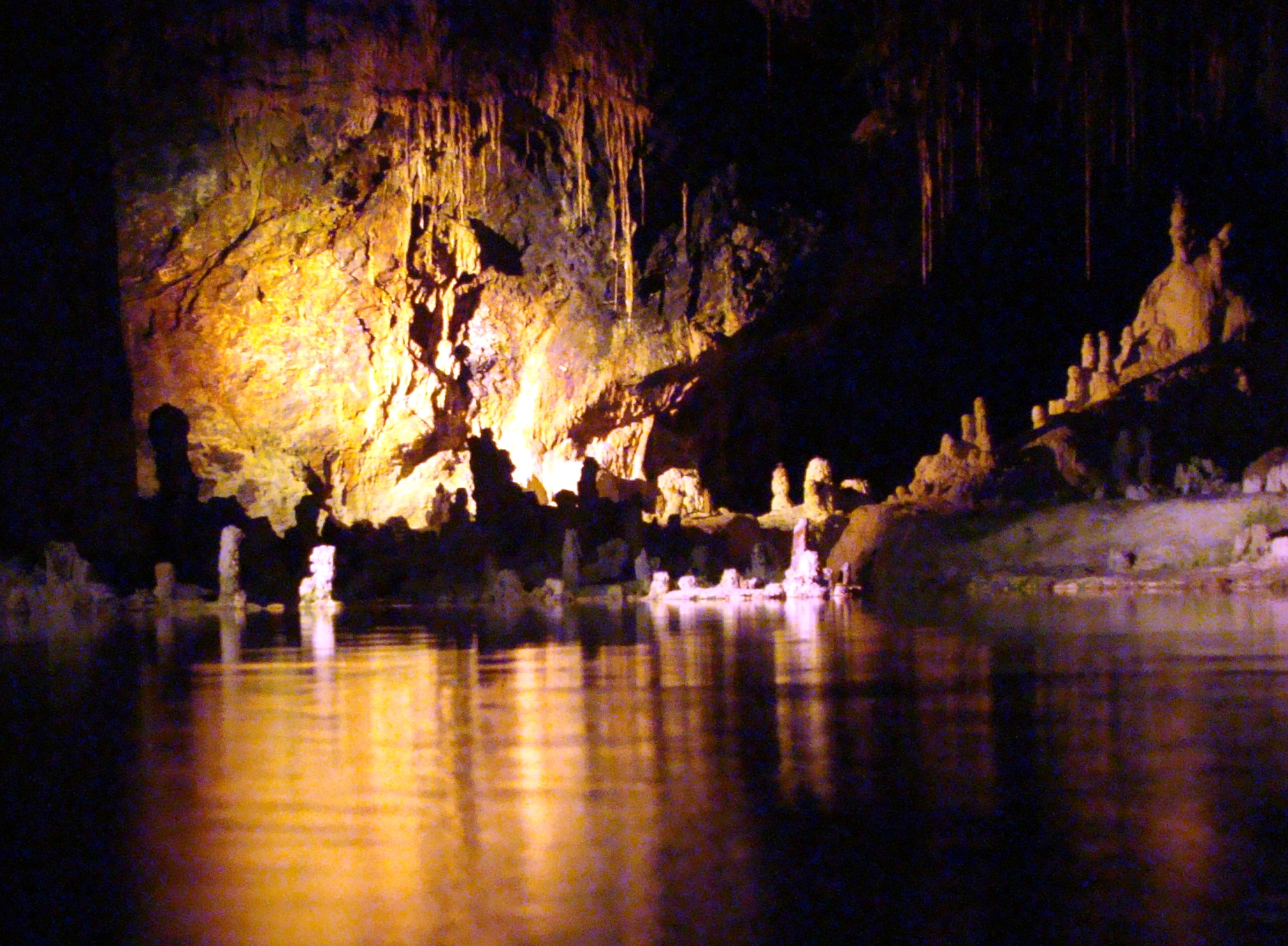

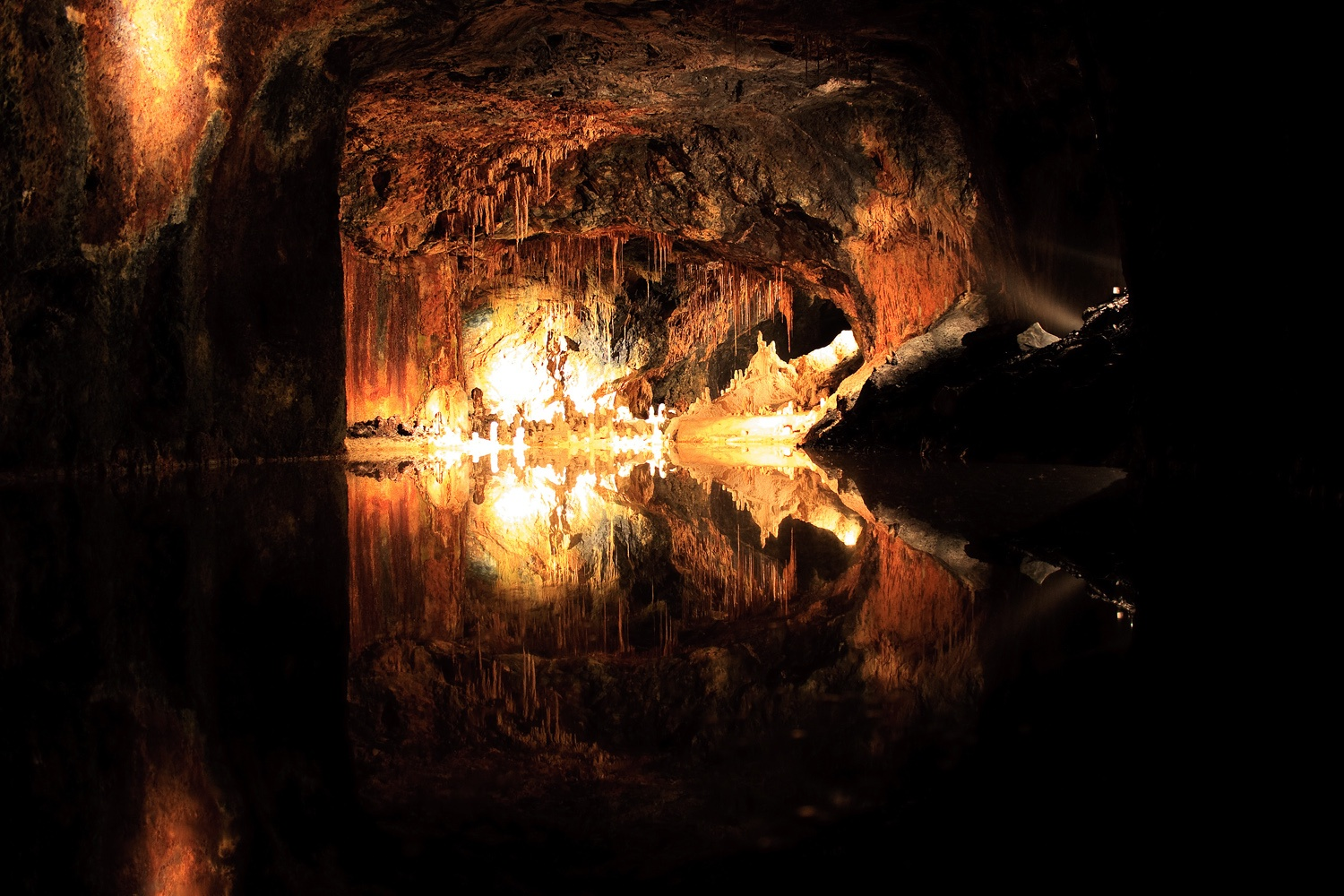

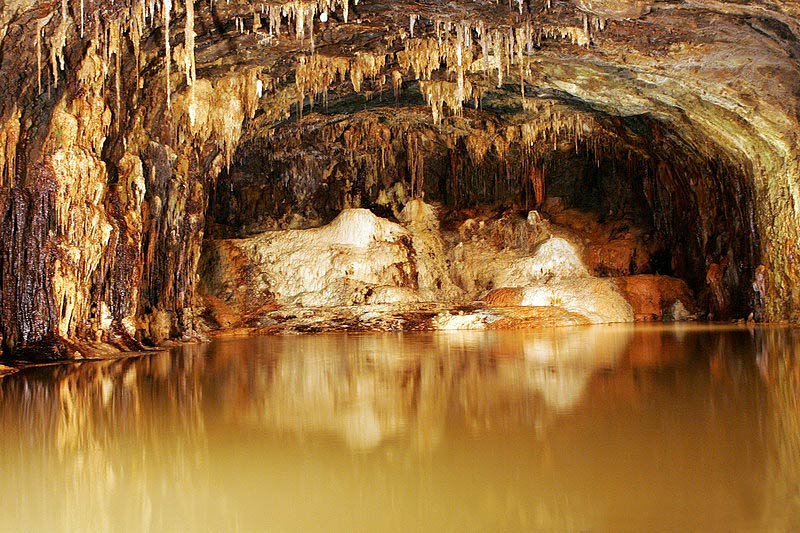

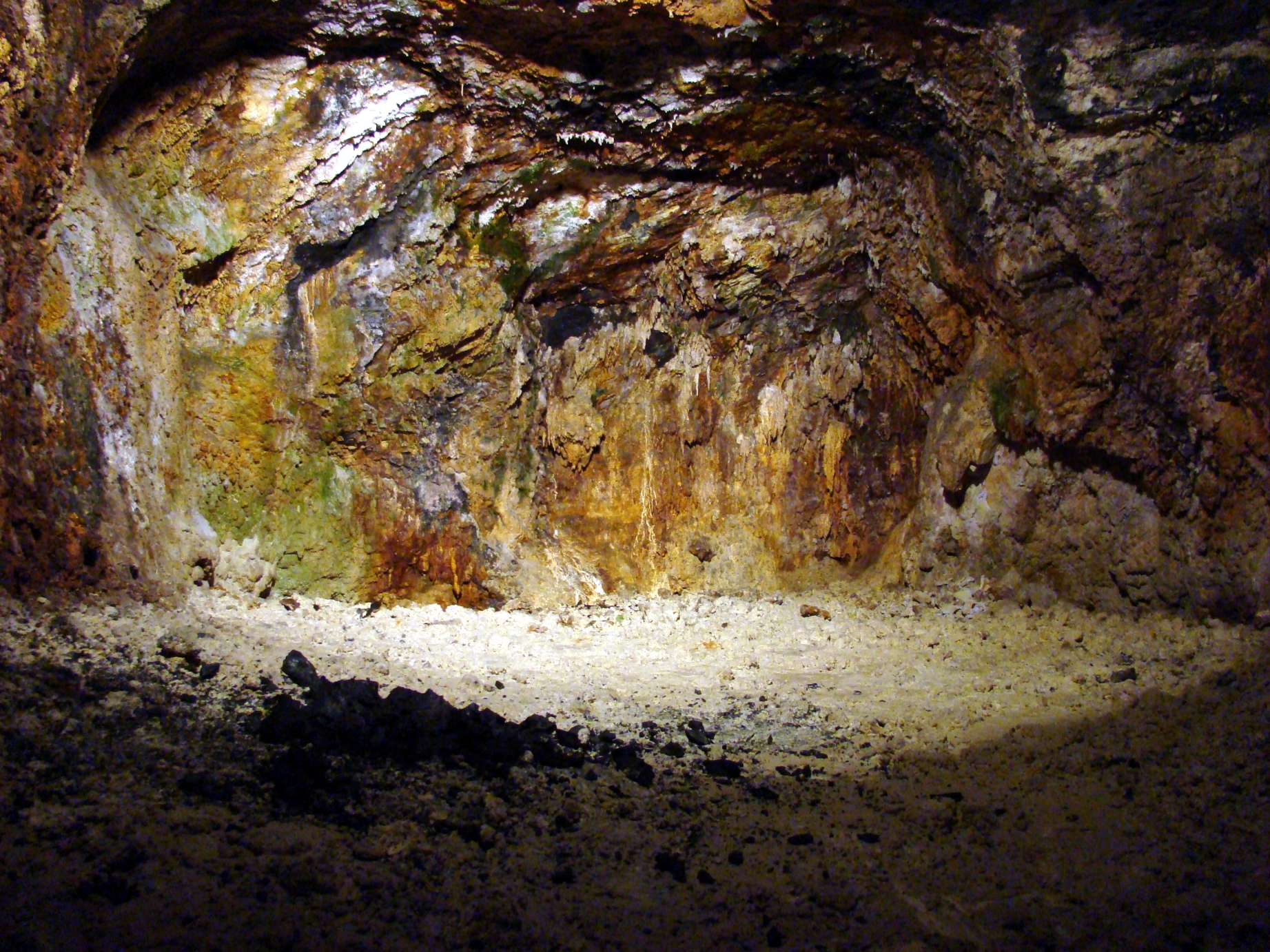

== See also ==
- List of show caves in Germany
