= Easter Cave =

Cave in Germany

- German: Osterhöhle
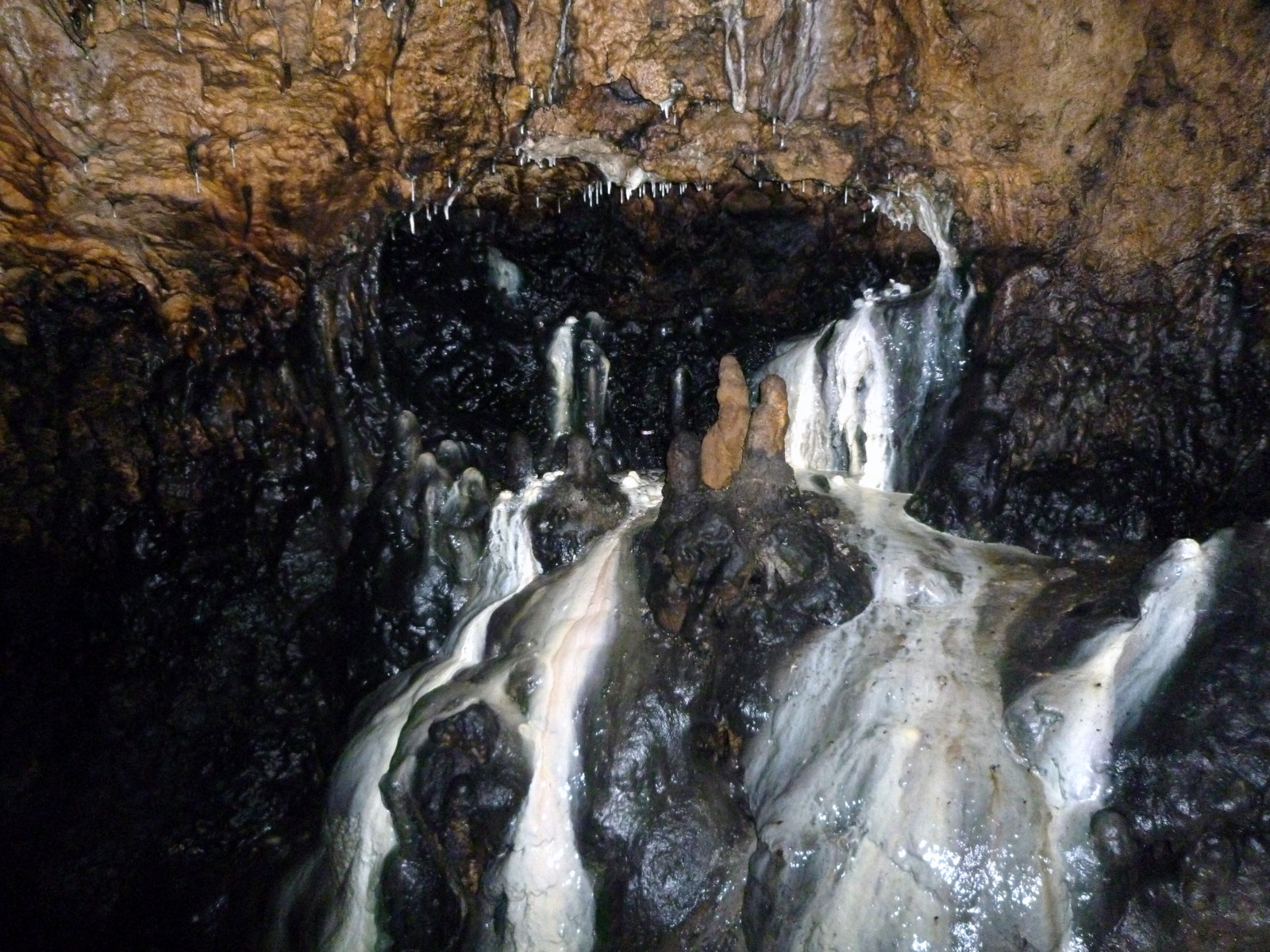
- Interactive map of Easter Cave
- Coordinates: 49.5192°N 11.6629°E
- Length: 185 metres (607 ft)
- Discovery: Before 1630
- Geology: High manganese concentration
- Show cave opened: 1905
- Lighting: Carbide lamps
- Website: www.osterhoehle.net

The Easter Cave (German: Osterhöhle) is a small cave in the vicinity of Trondorf (in the municipality of Neukirchen bei Sulzbach-Rosenberg) in Germany. The cave is 185 metres long and may be visited during the summer months. It was first mentioned in the records around 1630. The present entrance was artificially created in 1905 in order to open it as a show cave for visitors. The Easter Cave is one of the last caves in Germany to be lit with carbide lamps. Relatively high concentrations of manganese were found on the walls. The origin of the German name, Osterhöhle, is not entirely clear, but it probably comes from the location of the cave on the Osterberg, a hill whose name in turn may possibly be connected with the German goddess of dawn, Ostara.

== See also ==
- List of show caves in Germany
