= German Speleological Federation =

Organization in Germany

The German Speleological Federation (German: Verband der deutschen Höhlen- und Karstforscher, VdHK) is an umbrella organisation for speleologists in Germany and a point of contact for the issues connected with caves and karst landscapes. 90 regional clubs (especially caving clubs) and groups, as well as 5 state federations and over 500 individual members, belong to the Federation. Its main aims are the exploration and conservation of caves and karst features in Germany. Cave exploration in Germany is a voluntary activity that is carried out with the involvement of the VdHK and its members. Their main concern is to look after natural karst and cave terrain in a responsible manner. The Federation is a voluntary association.

The Federation was founded in 1955 at Donauwörth and its head office is in Munich. The Federation sees itself as the successor organisation to the Federation of German Speleologists (Hauptverbandes Deutscher Höhlenforscher), which existed from 1922 to 1945, and the German Karst Exploration Union (Deutsche Gesellschaft für Karstforschung), which ran from 1947 to 1950.

The VdHK is a member of the Union Internationale de Spéléologie (UIS).
