= Rübeland =

Village in Saxony-Anhalt, Germany

Coordinates: 51.75569°N 10.84660°E

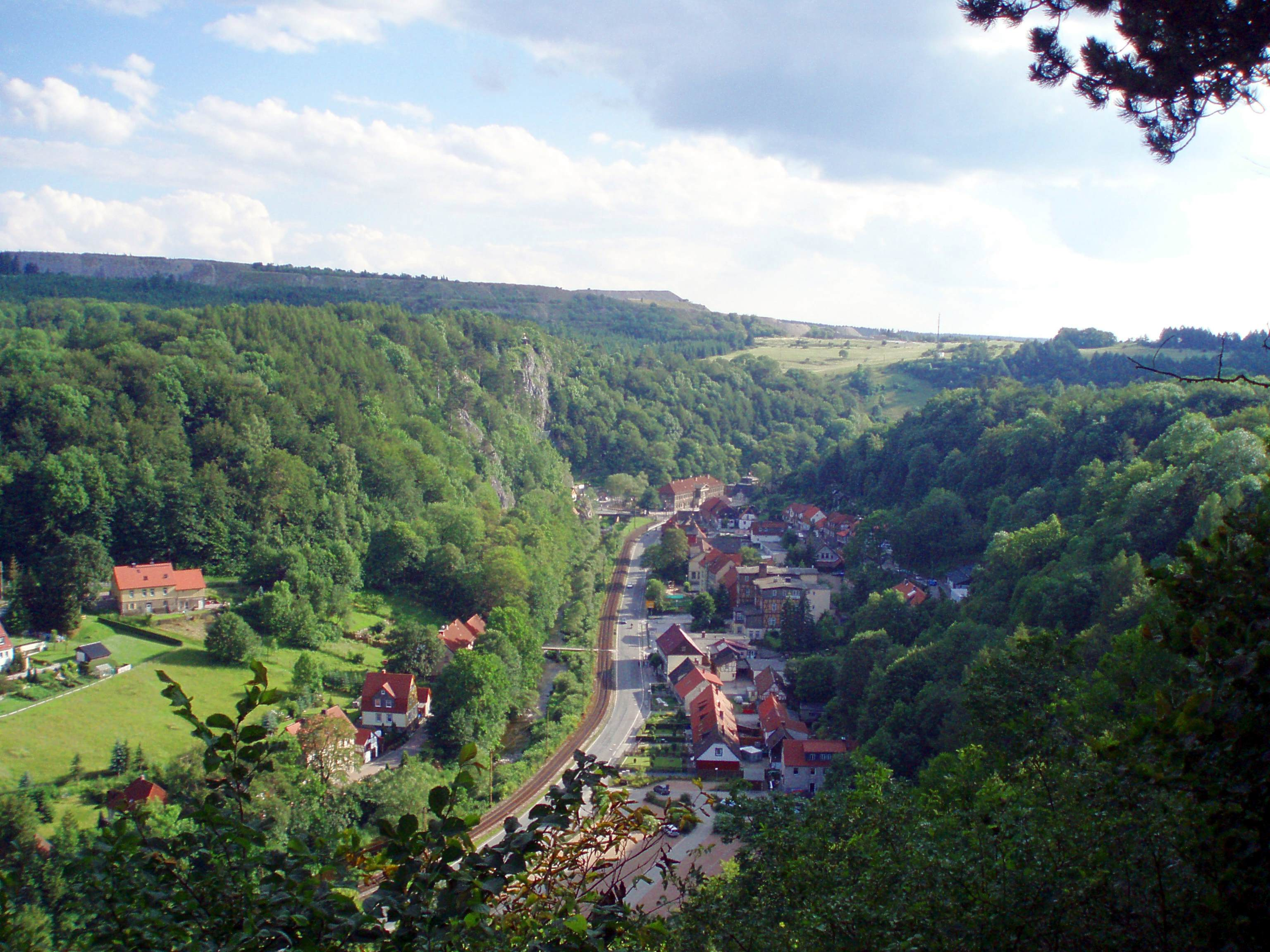
View from Schornsteinberg of the village

Rübeland (German pronunciation: [ˈʁyːbəlant]) is a village in the district of Harz in the German state of Saxony-Anhalt. Since 2004, it has been given the additional description of Höhlenort ("cave site"). The sub-districts of Rübeland are Susenburg, Kaltes Tal, Kreuztal and Neuwerk. Since 1 January 2010, it is part of the town Oberharz am Brocken. Its population is 424 (2021).

== Location ==
Rübeland lies in the Harz mountains on the river Bode. The Rübeland Railway and B 27 federal road run through it, a link road to the B 81 branching off in the centre of the village. South of the village stretches the Rappbode Reservoir. The bedrock in the region around Rübeland consists of Middle to Upper Devonian limestones of the Elbingerode Complex, that break the surface as crags in the area of the Bode Valley.

== Places of interest ==
- Schornsteinberg, a viewing point on a crag with excellent views of the valley and the village. Checkpoint no. 89 in the Harzer Wandernadel hiking network.
