= Wolfsklippen =

Granite mountain in Central Germany

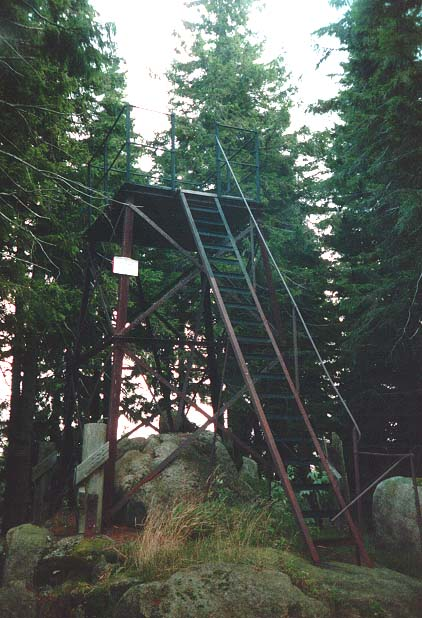
- Observation platform on the Wolfsklippen

Highest point
- Elevation: 723 m (2,372 ft)
- Coordinates: 51°49′08″N 10°40′22″E

Geography
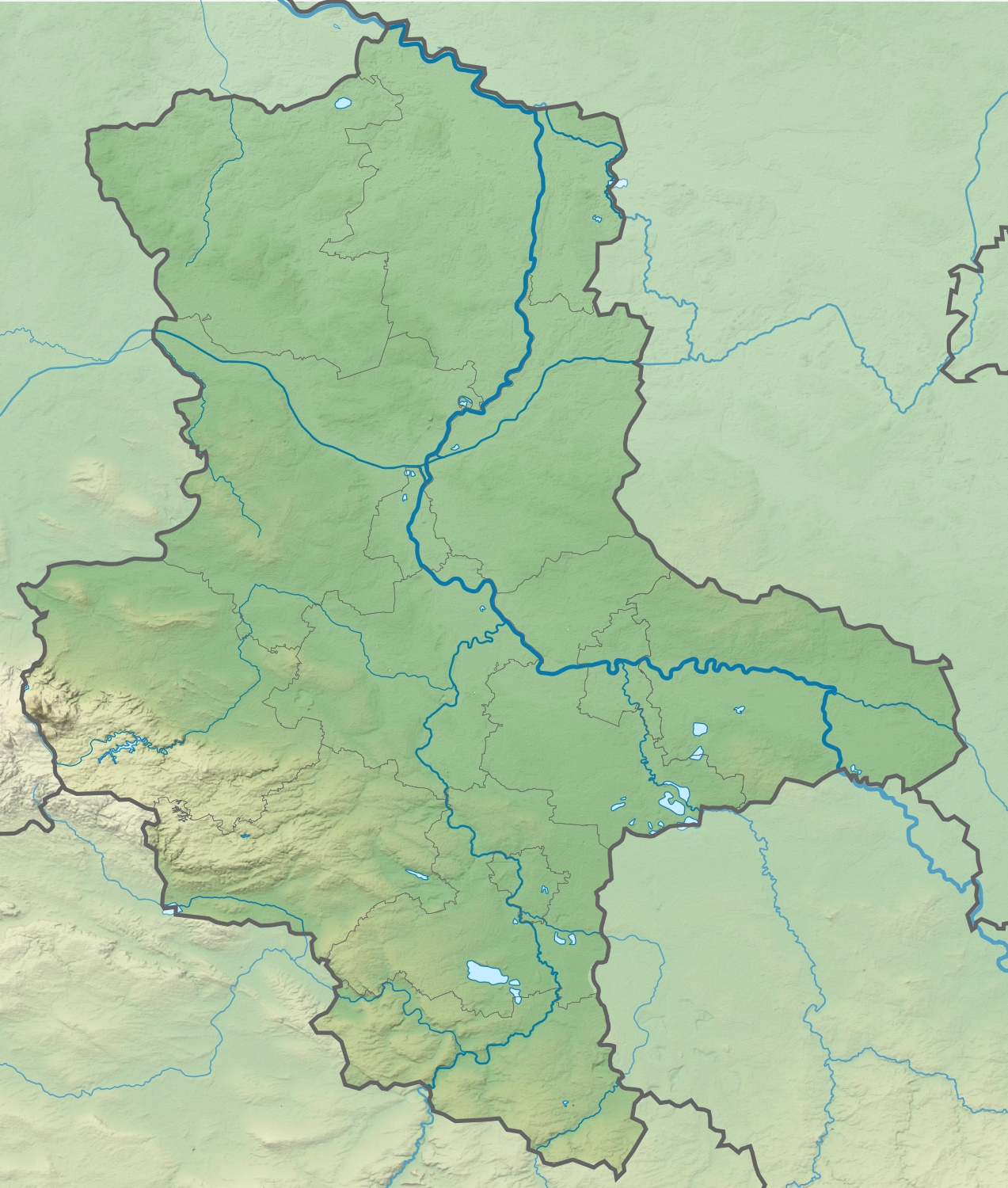
- Location within Saxony-Anhalt
- Location: Saxony-Anhalt, Germany
- Parent range: Harz Mountains

Geology
- Mountain type: Granite

The Wolfsklippen, also called the Wolfsklippe, is a granite mountain in the Harz mountains in Central Germany with an observation platform on the summit. Its height is frequently given as about 723 m above sea level (NN), but occasionally also as only around 710 m above NN.

== Location ==
The mountain lies northeast of the Brocken, the highest elevation in the Harz, about 200 m east of the road way from Drei Annen Hohne to Plessenburg.

== History ==
Over 100 years ago the Harz Club erected on the summit of the Wolfsklippen one of four iron observation platforms in the Harz that still exist. At that time it had a good view of the Brocken and towards Ilsenburg and Wernigerode. Today this outlook is no longer visible due to the tall spruce trees that block the view.

== Name and legend ==
AT the Wolfsklippen the last wolf in the area is supposed to have been killed, which is where the name of the mountain comes from. According to another legend, the name of the crags comes from the witch hunting period, when a girl accused of witchcraft hid here with a she-wolf.

== Walking ==
The Wolfsklippen is check point no. 24 on the walking trail network known as the Harzer Wandernadel.

== See also ==
- Joseph's Cross
- Schalke
- Poppenberg
