= Oehrenfeld =

- Stadtteil of Ilsenburg
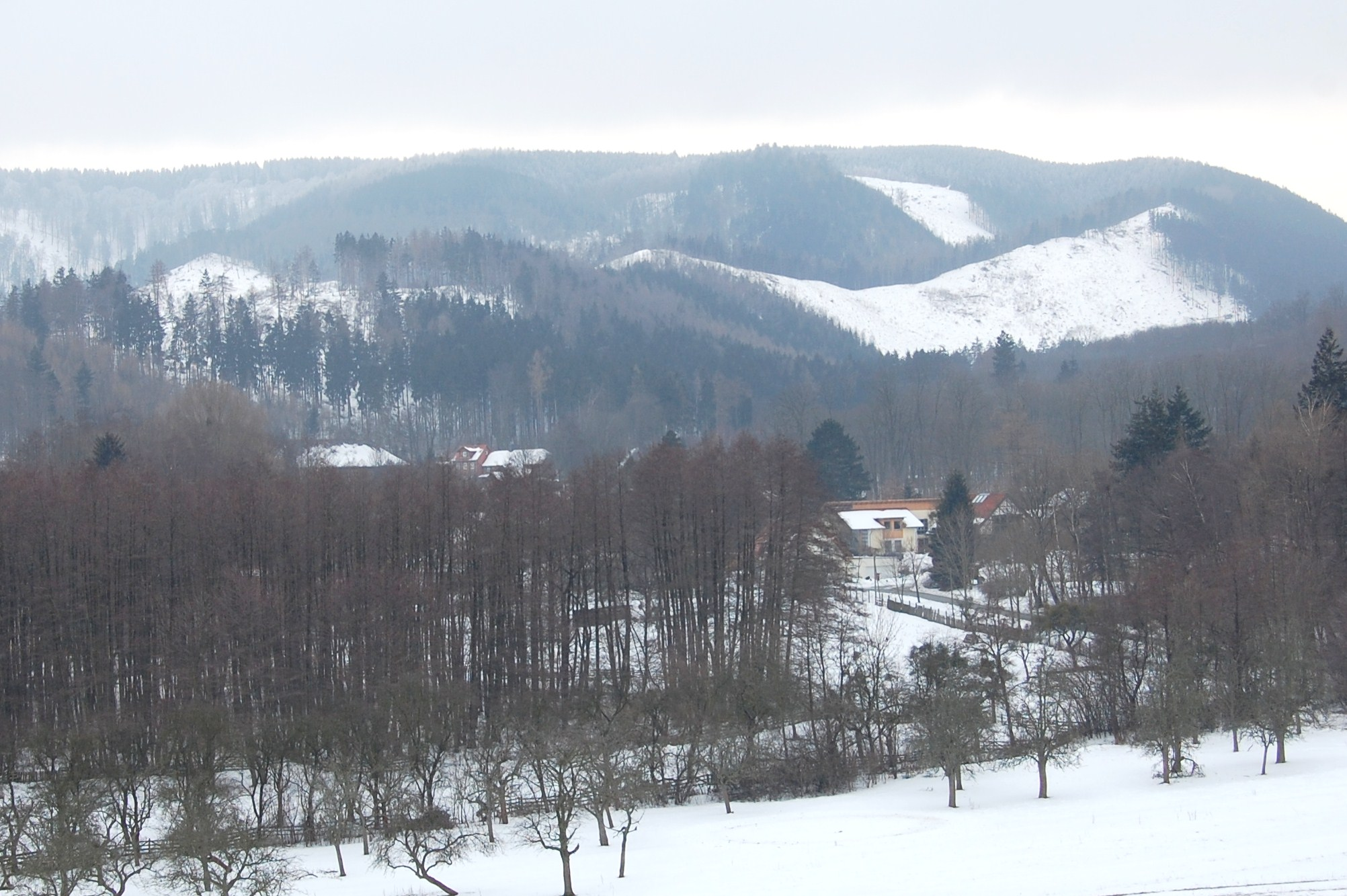
- View from the Karrberg
- Interactive map of Oehrenfeld
- Location within Germany Location within Saxony-Anhalt
- Coordinates: 51°50′47″N 10°42′58″E
- Country: Germany
- State: Saxony-Anhalt
- District: Harz
- Town: Ilsenburg
- Elevation: 280 m (920 ft)
- Time zone: UTC+01:00 (CET)
  - Summer (DST): UTC+02:00 (CEST)
- Postal codes: 38871
- Vehicle registration: HZ

Oehrenfeld, also Öhrenfeld (German pronunciation: [ˈøːʁənfɛlt]), is a part of Ilsenburg in Saxony-Anhalt, Germany.

== Geography ==
The Karrberg and Drübeck are located at the northern side of the village. In the east is the village of Darlingerode, also part of Ilsenburg. On the northern Edge of Oehrenfeld is the Rohrteich. In the southwestern part there on a path to Plessenburg is the Harschenhöllenklippe.

== History ==
In 1753/64 the gräfliche Zeughaus was constructed. Until 30 June 2009 Oehrenfeld was a part of Drübeck. On 1 July 2009 both were incorporated into Ilsenburg.
