= Am Kruzifix =

Coordinates: 51°50′39.1″N 10°36′41.7″E

Am Kruzifix is an ancient forest landmark in the Harz Mountains of Germany. Today it is recalled by an iron cross or crucifix at the junction of several hiking trails.

== History ==
Am Kruzifix was first mentioned in the records around 1640. The old crucifix that stood here was destroyed when the Inner German Border was built in the 1950s. The present one was erected in 1990 by the Ilsenburg branch of the Harz Club.

== Location ==
Am Kruzifix is located at an elevation of 595 metres above sea level in the district of Harz, in Saxony-Anhalt, Germany. It is on a junction where several hiking trails meet and there is a refuge hut nearby.

== Hiking ==
Am Kruzifix is on the old Kolonnenweg ("Convoy Way") at a junction where trails from Ilsenburg, the Scharfenstein, the Brocken and the Ecker Dam meet. Checkpoint no. 3 in the Harzer Wandernadel hiking network is located in the refuge hut.

== See also ==
- Hiking trails in Germany

== Bibliography ==
- Hahnemann, Marlies (2012). Die Harzer Wandernadel, 2nd ed., Cornelius, Halle. ISBN 978-3-95486-100-2.
