= Schalke (Harz) =

Mountain in Germany

Coordinates: 51°51′03″N 10°23′00″E

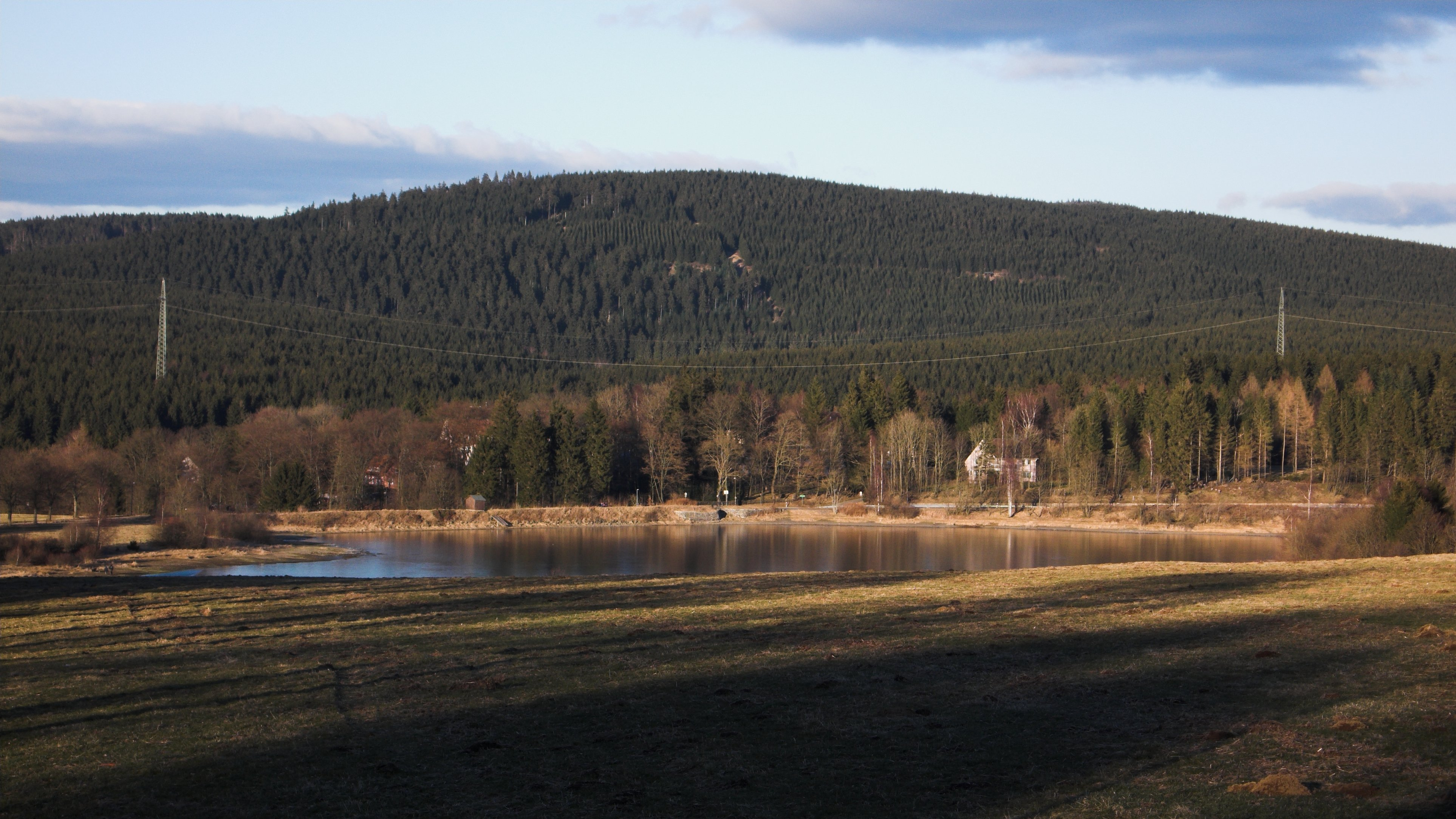
View from Zellerfeld to the Schalke. In the foreground the Stadtweg Pond

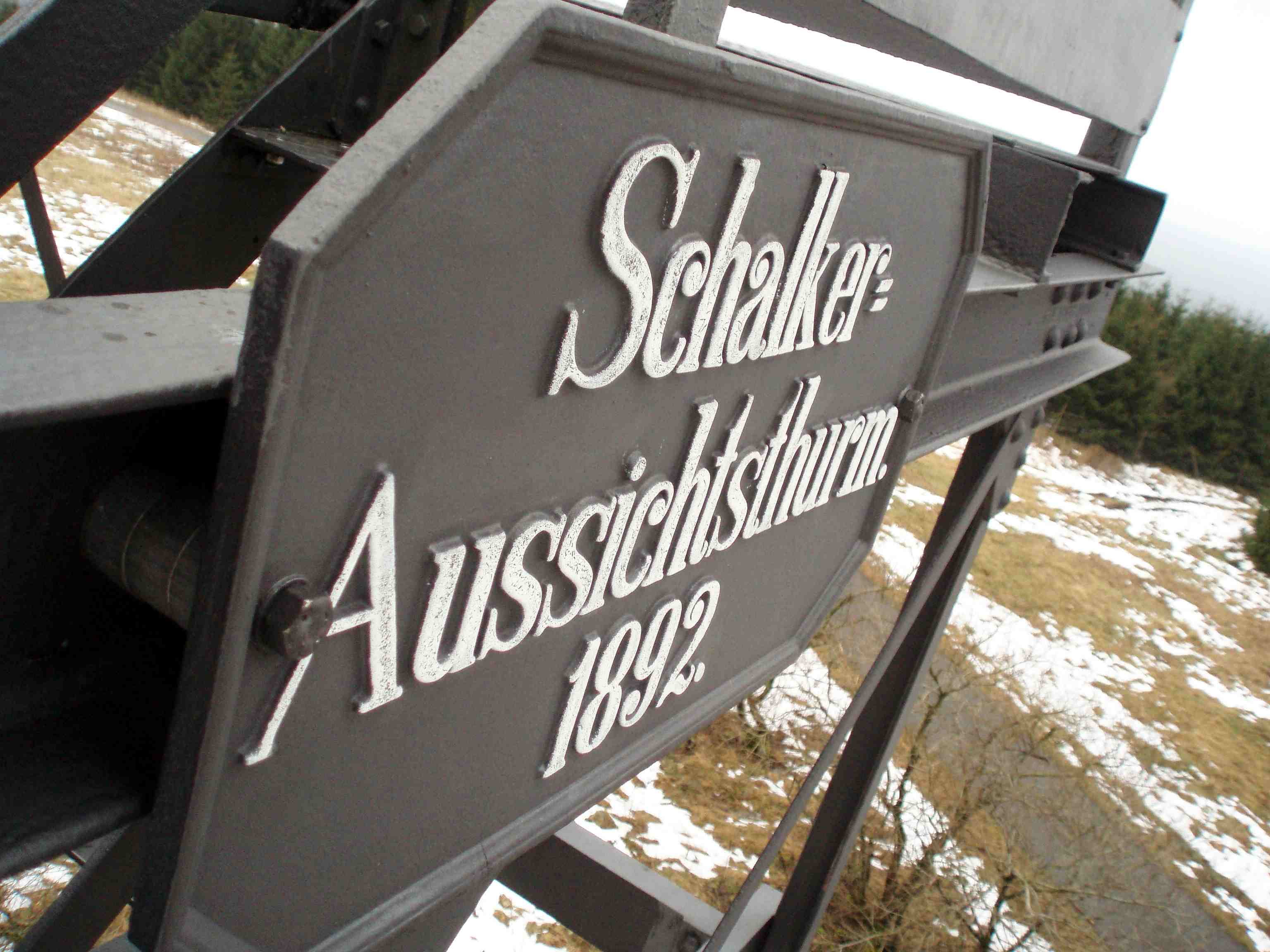
Plaque on the Schalke observation tower

The Schalke is a mountain, 762 m above sea level (NN), in the Upper Harz in the German state of Lower Saxony. It lies in Goslar district north of Clausthal-Zellerfeld and west of Schulenberg.

From 1959 there was a French listening post on the summit, which was supplemented in 1968 by a 64 m high concrete tower. This tower stood empty from 1993 and was demolished on 11 October 2002; the entire facility being removed in September 2003. Other listening posts in the Harz were located on the Wurmberg and the Stöberhai. Towers that still exist include those on the Ravensberg and the Bocksberg, the latter not far from the Schalke.

The observation tower, which was about 10.5 m high, stood about 50 metres southeast of the listening post until 2002 and, following the demolition of the latter, was moved back to its original site on the summit. However it only has good views towards the east and south. The view extends from the Brocken past the Wurmberg and Hanskühnenburg to Clausthal-Zellerfeld. Next to the tower stands a shooting hut belonging to the Harz Club and stamp checkpoint no. 125 which is part of the Harzer Wandernadel hiking trail network. The tower is the oldest (built 1892, restored 1992) of four steel observation towers belonging to the Harzklub in the Harz.

A road, closed to private cars, runs from the Auerhahn Inn on the B 241 federal highway up to the Schalke. There are also long hiking trails from Zellerfeld and Goslar and a short, steep footpath from Mittelschulenberg past the Lower Schalke Pond and Festenburg, two parishes in Schulenberg, up to the Schalke.

== See also ==
- List of mountains and hills in Lower Saxony
- Josephskreuz
- Poppenberg
- Wolfsklippen
