= Harschenhöllenklippe =

Rock formation in the Harz mountains, Germany

Coordinates: 51.843484°N 10.702282°E

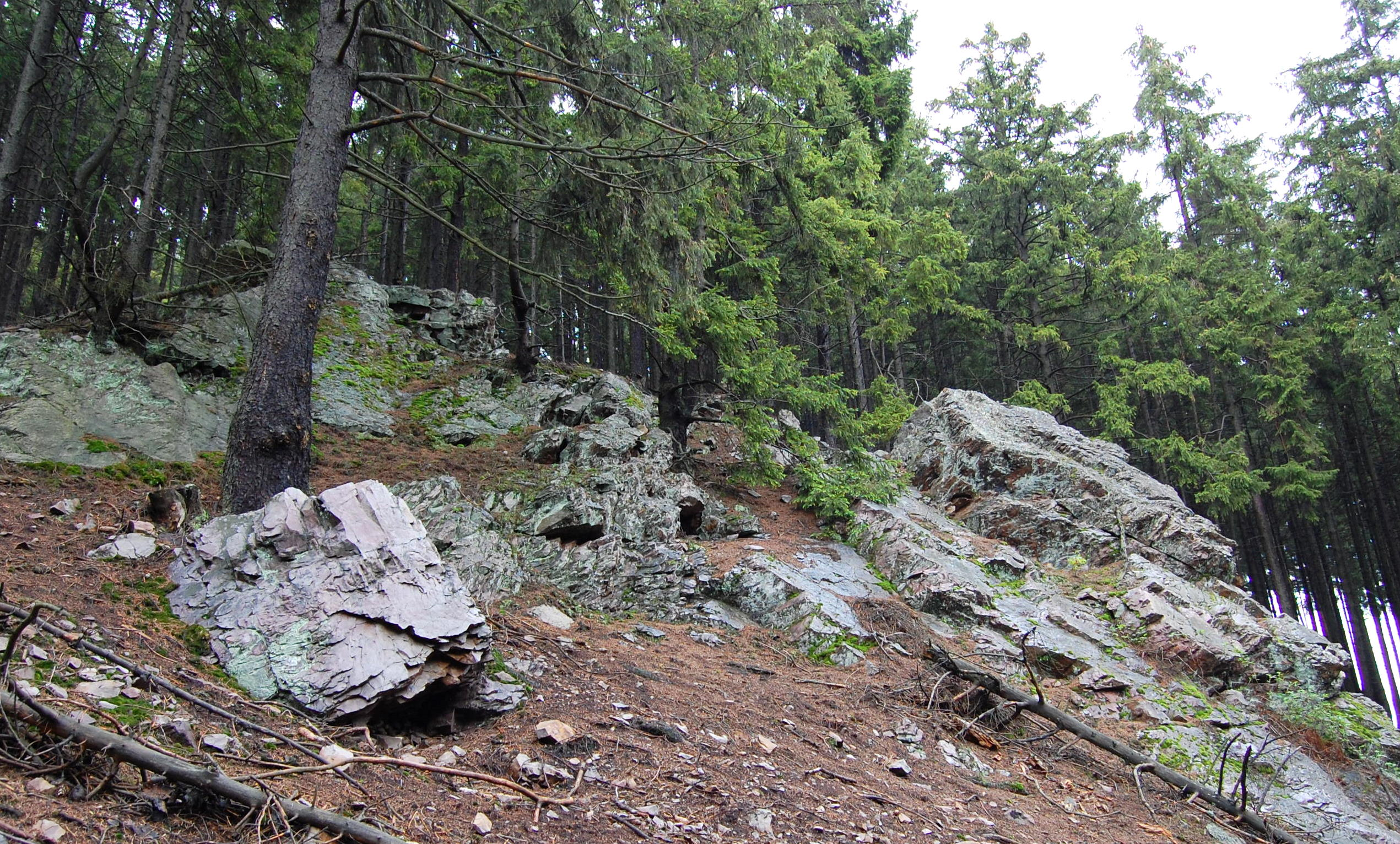
Harschenhöllenklippe

The Harschenhöllenklippe is a rock formation in the Harz mountains in the German state of Saxony-Anhalt.

The crag is located on the northern slopes of the Tänn valley (Tänntal). It lies southwest of Oehrenfeld and belongs to the borough of Ilsenburg. The forest way from Oehrenfeld to the Plessenburg passes some way north of the crag. The rock itself stands in a clearing in the forest and cannot be reached on a footpath.

== See also ==
- Harzklippen
