= Little Harz =

Miniature park in Germany

Little Harz German: Miniaturenpark „Kleiner Harz“ im Bürgerpark Wernigerode
- Interactive map of Little Harz; German: Miniaturenpark „Kleiner Harz“ im Bürgerpark Wernigerode
- Location: Wernigerode, Saxony-Anhalt, Germany
- Coordinates: 51.844907°N 10.781431°E
- Status: Operating
- Opened: May 1, 2009
- Area: 1.5 hectares (3.7 acres)
- Website: Official website

Little Harz (German: Kleiner Harz) is a miniature park in Wernigerode in Saxony-Anhalt in Germany. It displays more than 60 detailed replicas of selected buildings and attractions of the Harz region on a scale of 1:25. The area is 1.5 hectares (3.7 acres). The miniature park is part of the Bürgerpark, a 15 hectares (37 acres) landscape park with more than 60 themed gardens, numerous playgrounds, recreational areas and a pet enclosure.

== History ==
In 2006, in Wernigerode was held a Regional Garden Show and the Bürgerpark was developed. Starting in March 2006 and beyond the opening of the miniature park in May 2009, more than 60 participants in employment promotion measures of the Oskar Kämmer School in Wernigerode worked on the true-to-scale and detailed replicas. 68,000 working hours were e.g. for Wernigerode Castle. The miniature park "Kleiner Harz" is operated by Park und Garten GmbH Wernigerode.

== Models (selection) ==
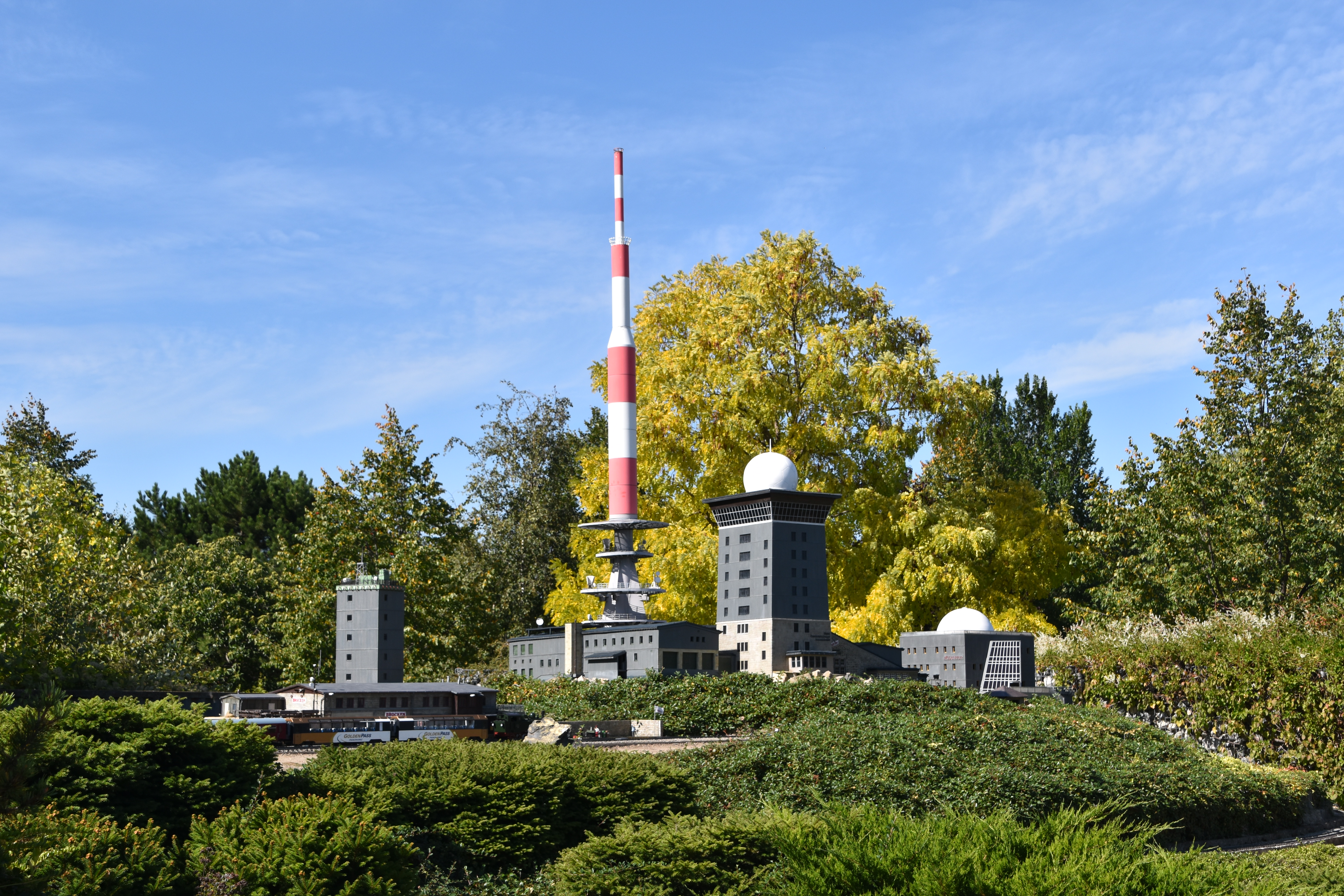
The summit of the Brocken (replica)

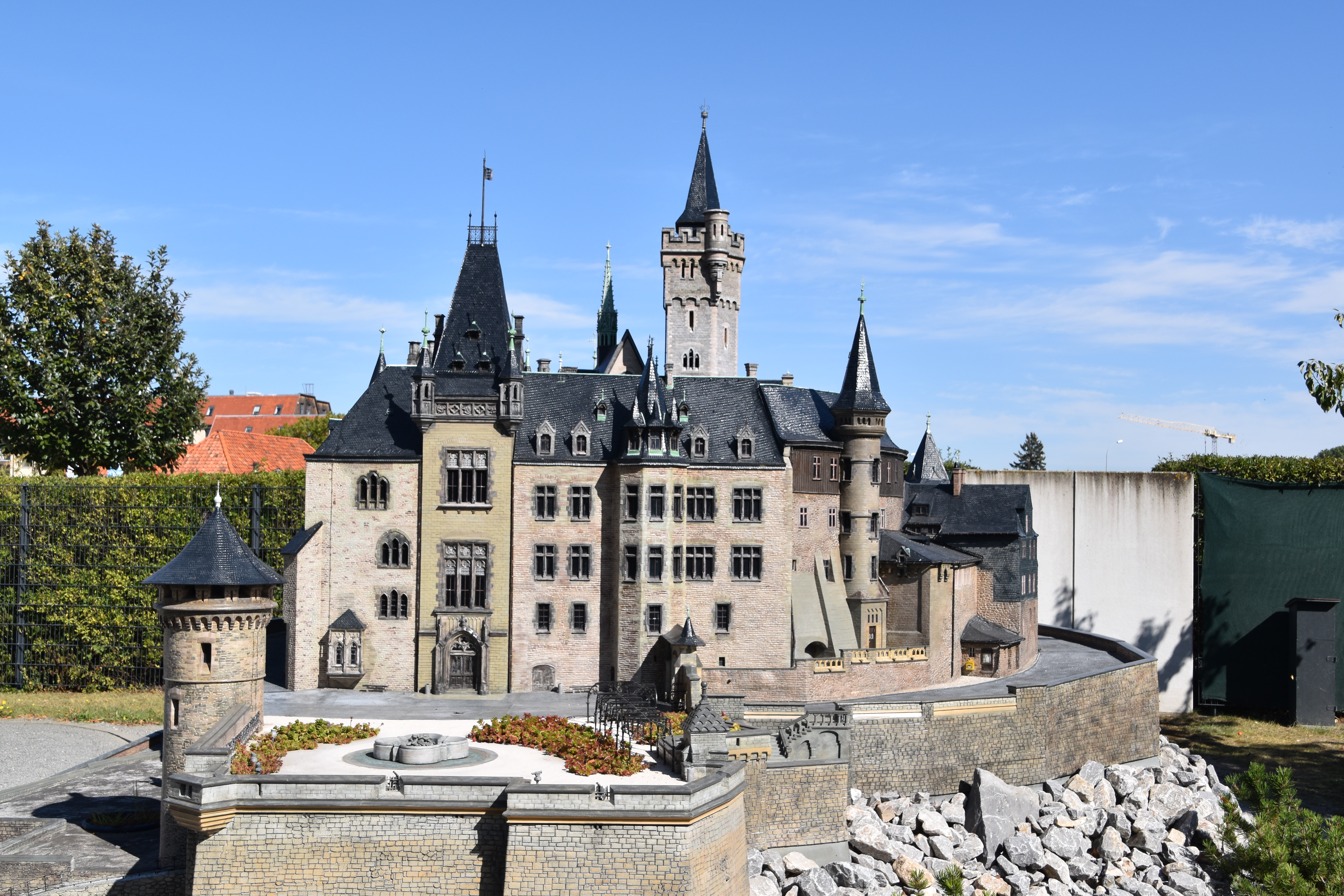
Wernigerode Castle (replica)

- Wernigerode Castle
- Wernigerode Ensemble Town Hall with Market Street, Leaning House, Gothic House
- Brocken and Brocken station
- Kaiserturm on the Armeleuteberg near Wernigerode
- Wooden church, Elend
- St. Martin's Church, Halberstadt
- Halberstadt Cathedral
- Gleimhaus, Halberstadt
- Schlossberg with St. Servatii Collegiate Church and Quedlinburg Town Hall
- Saint Cyriakus, Gernrode
- Joseph Cross, Stolberg
- Falkenstein Castle
- Bode Valley Gondola Lift
- Imperial Palace of Goslar
- Market Ensemble Goslar with Town Hall, Kaiserring, Hotel Kaiser Wörth
- Wandelhalle, Bad Harzburg
- Herzberg Castle
