= Ferdinandstein =

Coordinates: 51°49′25″N 10°39′08″E

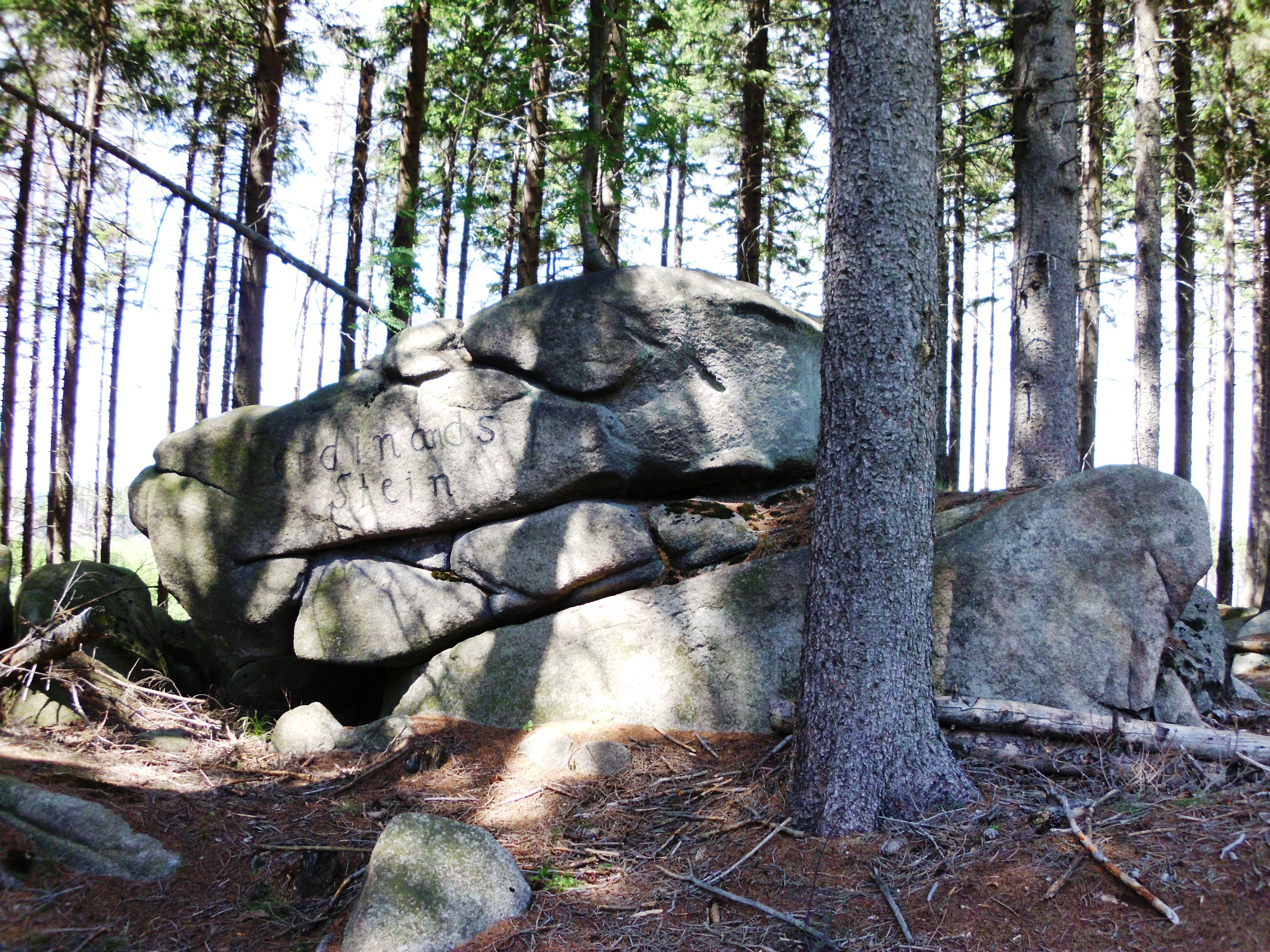
Ferdinandstein, Harz National Park, Germany

The Ferdinandstein is a prominent rock in the Harz National Park in central Germany

== Geography ==
=== Location ===
The Ferdinandstein lies at an elevation of 648 metres above sea level near Plessenburg in the borough of Wernigerode in the Harz Mountains.

=== Geology ===
The rock is a granite boulder that is a typical product of spheroidal weathering.

== History ==
The rock is inscribed with the words "Ferdinands Stein". Behind it on a smaller rock embedded in the ground is the inscription "Hier schoss Ferdinand Graf zu Stolberg Wernigerode am 23ten Merz 1798 einen Wolf" ("Here Ferdinand, Count of Stolberg- Wernigerode shot a wolf on 23 March 1798"). This was the last wolf living in the wild that was shot by the Count.

== Views and hiking ==
The rock is checkpoint no. 16 in the Harzer Wandernadel hiking network.

== Literature ==
- Hahnemann, Marlies (2011). Die Harzer Wandernadel, 2nd ed., Projeckte-Verlag Cornelius, Halle, p. 29. ISBN 978-3-95486-100-2.
