= Ilsenburg Factory =

Historical monument in Ilsenburg, Saxony-Anhalt, Germany

Coordinates: 51.866051°N 10.679998°E

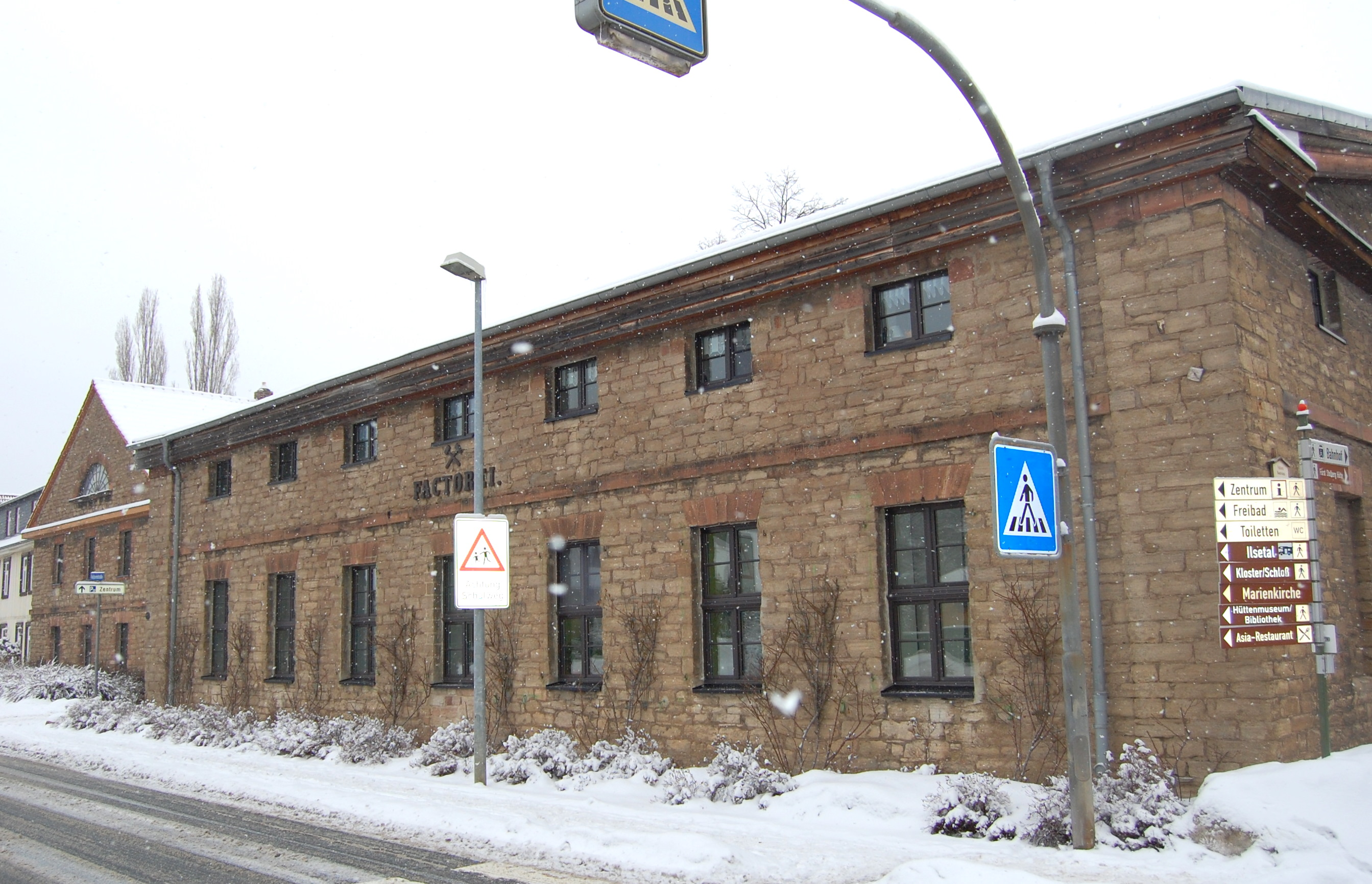

The Ilsenburg Factory is a protected historical monument in Ilsenburg in Saxony-Anhalt in Germany.

The building complex is from around 1840 and was the seat of the upper Administration of the princely smelting works. Today, the buildings are used as residences.

In neoclassical style, the building material was Rogenstein (a term describing a specific type of oolite in which the cementing matter is argillaceous). The four buildings are each two stories, arranged around a courtyard. Except for the northern house, where the facades are unpaved.

== Literature ==
- Ute Bednarz, Dehio, Handbuch der Deutschen Kunstdenkmäler, Sachsen-Anhalt I, Regierungsbezirk Magdeburg, Deutscher Kunstverlag München Berlin 2002, ISBN 3-422-03069-7, Seite 442 f.
