= Plessenburg =

Village in Ilsenburg, Harz, Germany

Coordinates: 51°49′55″N 10°40′05″E

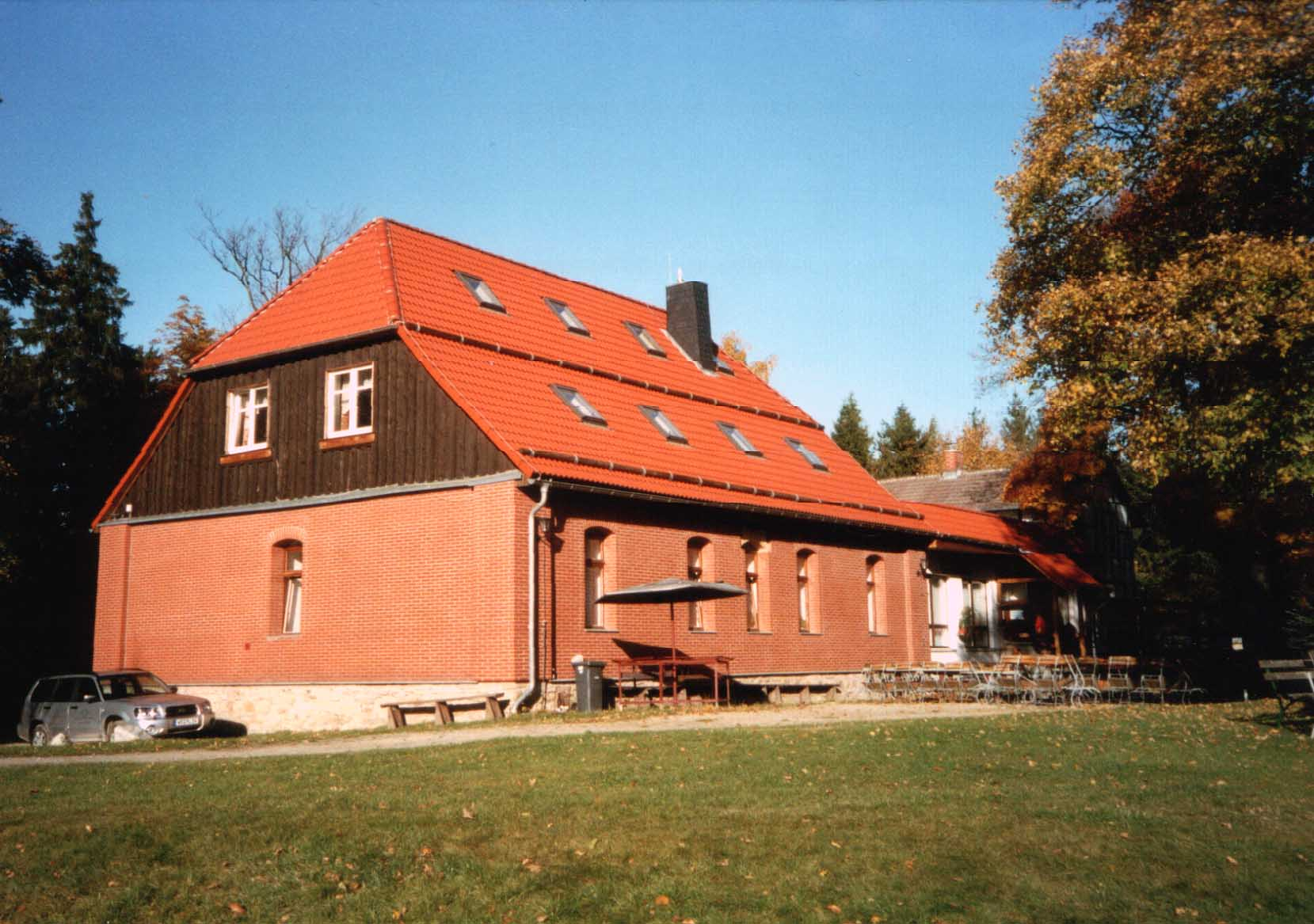
The Plessenburg building of 1776

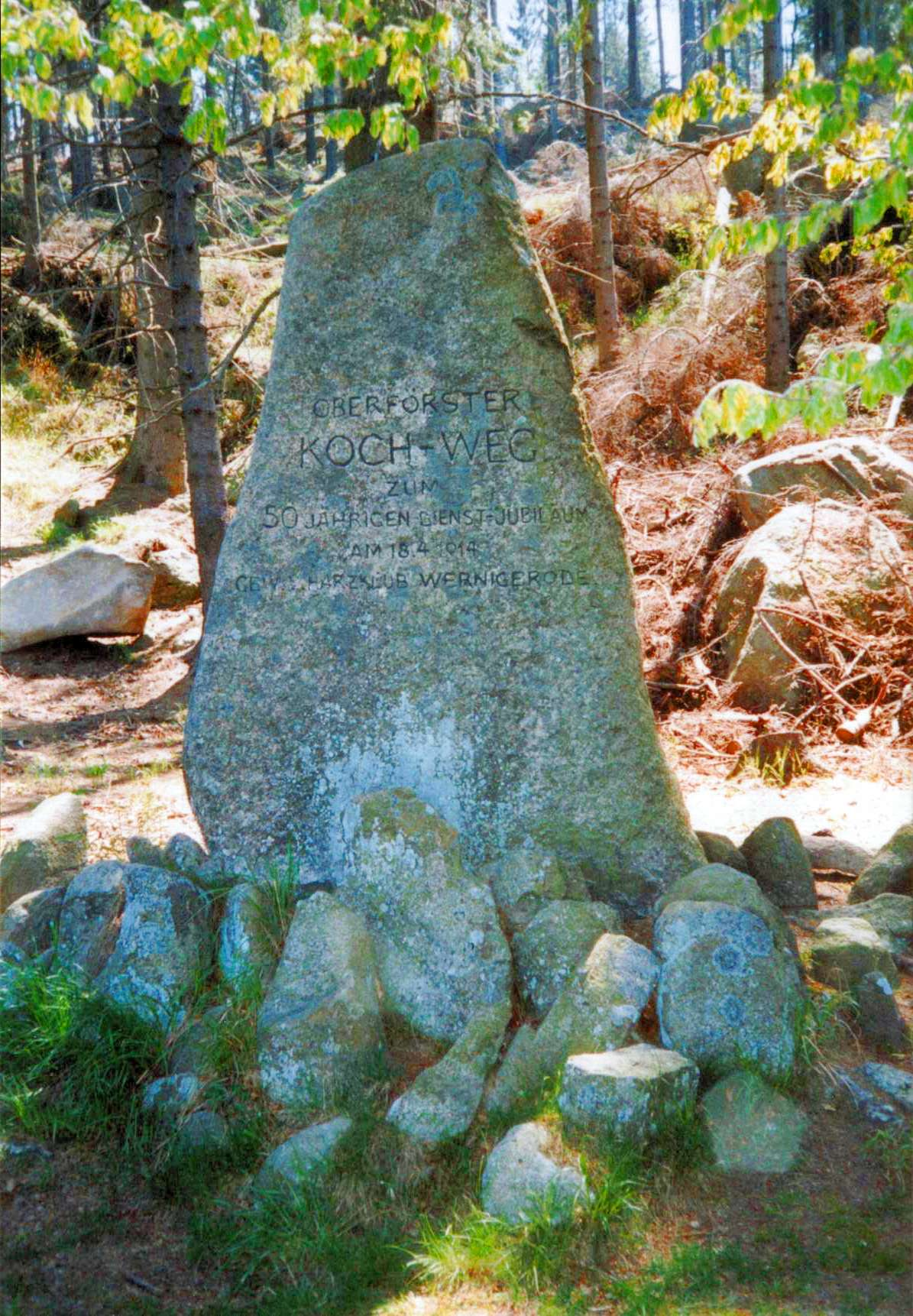
Memorial stone not far from Plessenburg. Inscription means: "Oberförster Koch Way / on the 50th anniversary of its opening / on 18.4.1914 / dedicated by the Wernigerode Harz Club"

Plessenburg is a village in the town of Ilsenburg in the Harz National Park, in the district of Harz in the German state of Saxony-Anhalt.

== Location and establishment ==
In the years 1775-76 Count Henry Ernest of Stolberg-Wernigerode had a grand hunting lodge built on the Königskoll in the Huysburger Häu south of Ilsenburg. He named it Plessenburg after his son-in-law, Prince Frederick Erdmann of Anhalt-Köthen-Pleß. In the 19th century, there was a forester's house some distance away from the hunting lodge, which soon become a popular day tripper's cafe. In 1880 a timber-framed building was built for the kitchen staff immediately next to the hunting lodge. The kitchen staff building became a restaurant when the Princes of Stolberg-Wernigerode were dispossessed after the Second World War, and it was later joined structurally to the old hunting lodge. Today it is a popular inn for day visitors, the Gasthaus Plessenburg.

== Tourism ==
Numerous footpaths converge on Plessenburg from the surrounding area; from Ilsenburg, Drübeck, Darlingerode, Wernigerode and Bad Harzburg. It is a popular intermediate stop on the outward or return journey to the highest peak in the Harz, the Brocken. Not far from the Plessenburg lie the crags of the Wolfsklippen with their observation platform, and the Ilse Falls in the Ilse valley. In addition there is a summer bus route from Wernigerode via Ilsenburg to Plessenburg (from the beginning of May to the end of October).

Plessenburg and the Oberförster Koch Memorial are numbers 7 and 25 in the system of checkpoints on the Harzer Wandernadel hiking network. Also in the vicinity is the Ferdinandstein (no. 16).
