= Himmelpforten Monastery (Harz) =

Ruined monastery

Coordinates: 51°49′47″N 10°44′30″E

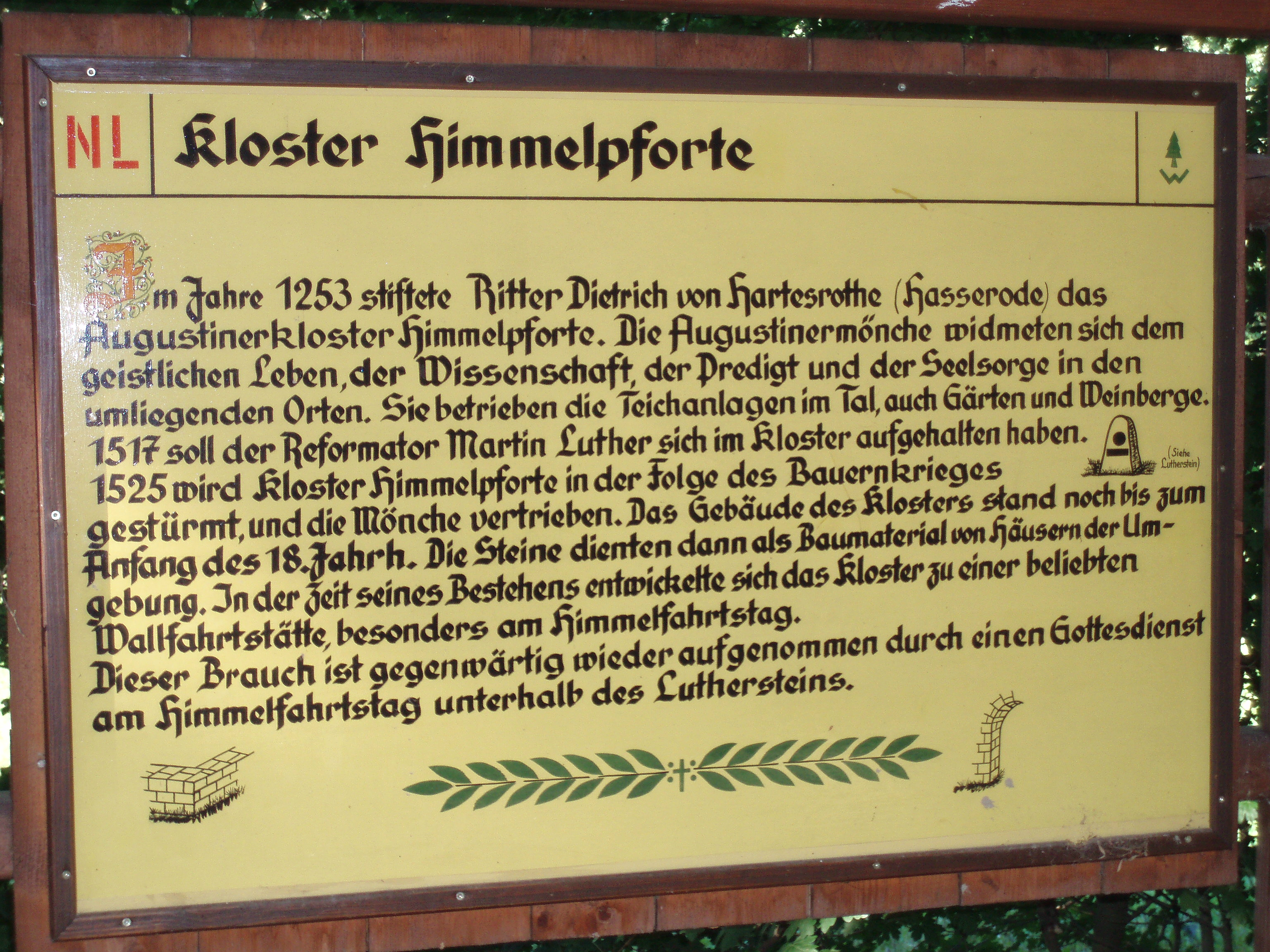
Information board

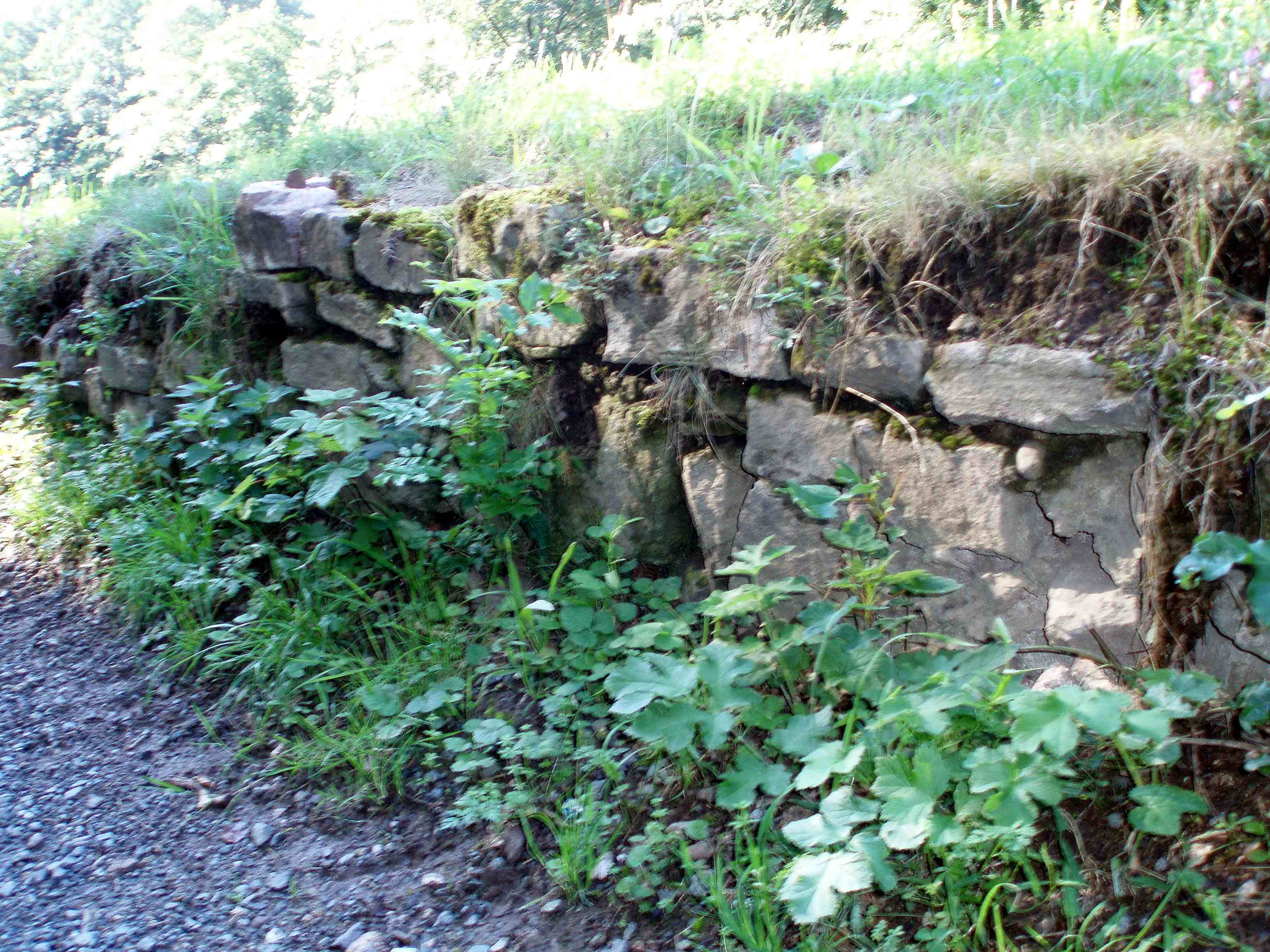
Ruins of the abbey wall

Himmelpforten Monastery (German: Kloster Himmelpforten) was an Augustinian hermitage in the Harz Mountains of Germany, halfway between Hasserode (in the borough of Wernigerode ) and Darlingerode. The name "Himmelpforten" means the "Gates of Heaven".

== History ==
The monastery was founded in 1253 by the lords of Hartesrode in a sheltered, wooded valley, northwest of Hasserode. They chose this site because Hermits of St. William had previously resided here. The Augustinian friars bred fish and even grew vineyards. Martin Luther visited Himmelpforten on 6 August 1517, where he met his friend and fellow friar, at that time the Vicar General of the Order, Johann von Staupitz, with whom he discussed the sale of indulgences.

The Luther memorial tablet (Luthergedenkstein) erected in 1917 commemorates that meeting.

== Personalities ==
The noted theologian and preacher, Friar Andreas Proles, served in this monastery as prior until his death in 1503.
