= Scharfenstein (Ilsenburg) =

Mountain in Harz, Saxony-Anhalt, Germany

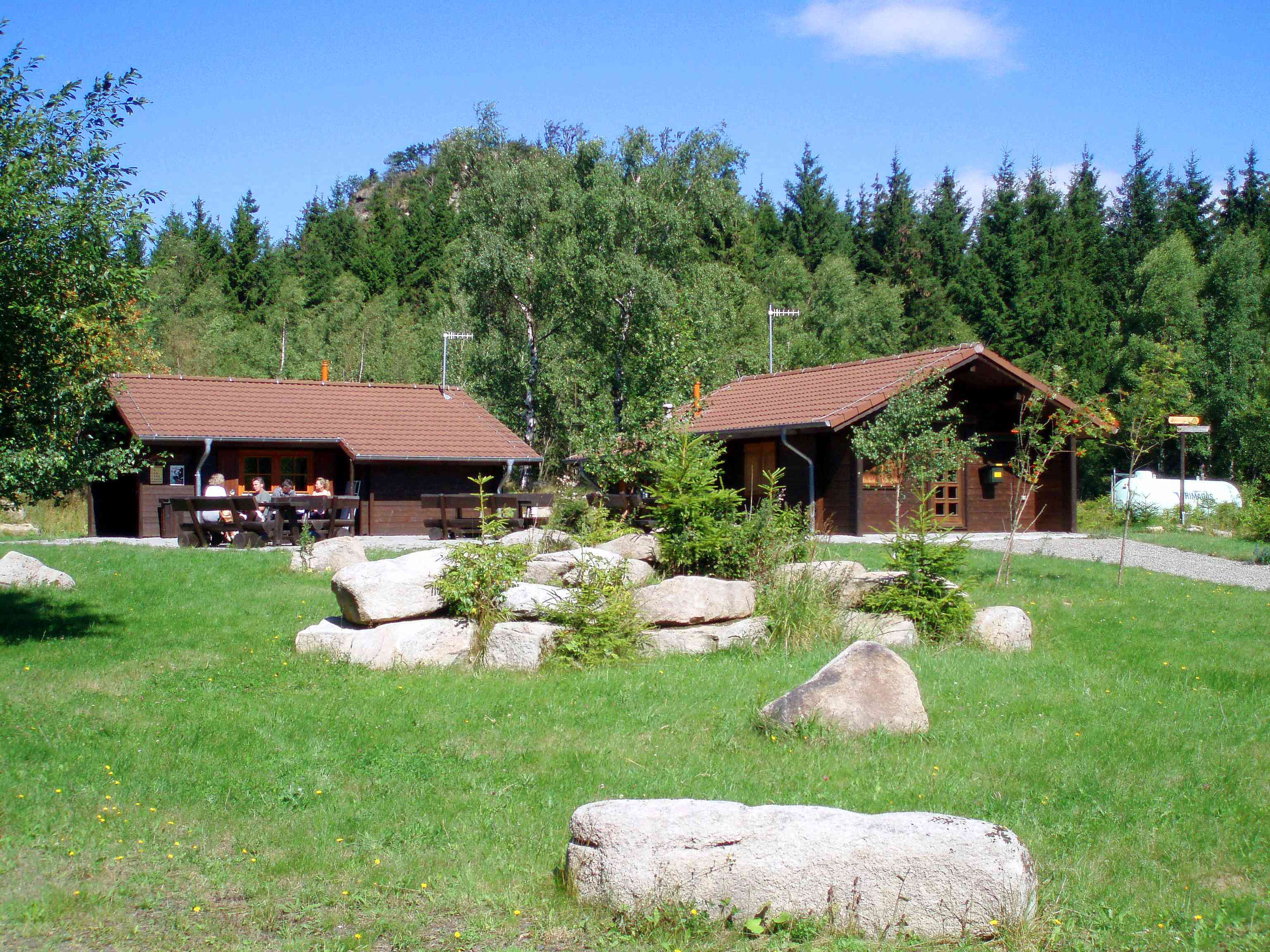
- View from the ranger station of the Scharfenstein and Scharfensteinklippe

Highest point
- Elevation: 697.6 m above sea level (NN) (2,289 ft)
- Coordinates: 51°49′56″N 10°36′03″E

Geography
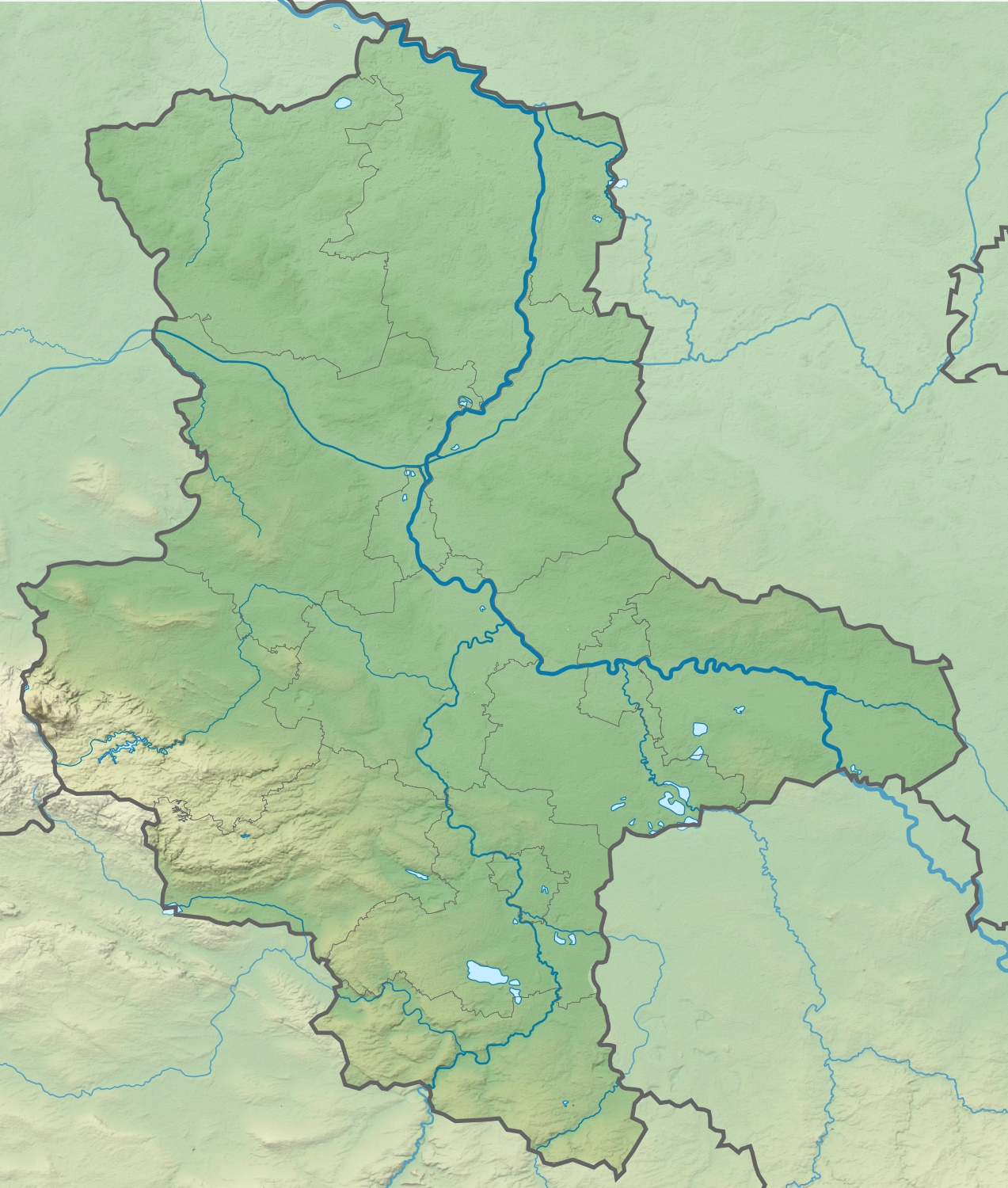
- Location within Saxony-Anhalt
- Location: Ilsenburg, Harz district, Saxony-Anhalt, Germany
- Parent range: Harz (Upper Harz, High Harz)

The Scharfenstein is a mountain, 697.6 m above sea level (NN) high, in the Harz Mountains of Germany, near Ilsenburg in the district of Harz in Saxony-Anhalt. It is part of the Harz National Park.

== Geographical location ==
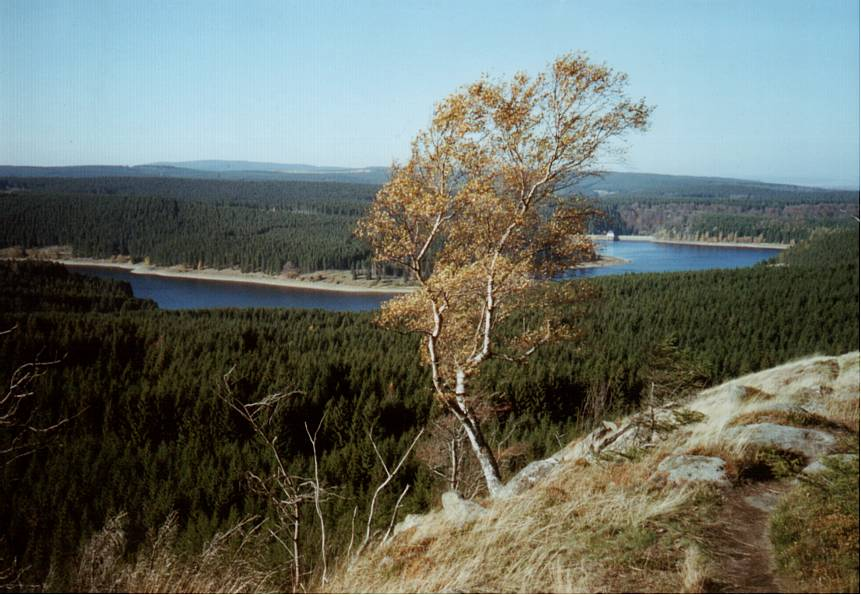
View from the Scharfensteinklippe of the Ecker Reservoir

The Scharfenstein lies southwest of Ilsenburg, southeast of the Lower Saxony town of Bad Harzburg, north of the Kleiner Brocken mountain and east of the Ecker Reservoir, which lies on the Ecker River, straddling the border between the states of Saxony-Anhalt and Lower Saxony. The mountain is topped by a tor, the Scharfensteinklippe; which has particularly good views of the Brocken, and in the direction of Torfhaus and the Ecker Reservoir. Below the summit is the Scharfenstein ranger station of the national park with a self-service cafe.

== Name ==
Its name is descriptive and comes from the German scharfer/spitzer ("sharp", "pointed") or schroffer ("rugged", "craggy") and Stein ("rock" or "stone"). The Scharfenstein's appearance as a solid, rocky crag is particularly evident when viewed from the south, for example, from the Ecker Reservoir.

== History ==
The area around the Scharfenstein was used from 1420 as a cattle pasture by the settlement at Ilsenburg, for which the first herdsman's house was built. The cattle farm was still being managed in 1816 from Stapelburg. Around 1875, Count Otto of Stolberg-Wernigerode has a forester's lodge built that, together with the forest settlement that emerged in the 1920s, developed into a popular stop for hikers en route to the Brocken as well as a restaurant and place to stay.

On 11/12 April 1945 US troops occupied the Scharfenstein without a fight. They were replaced in July that year by the Red Army.

Because of its location near the border of Lower Saxony the first wooden barracks was built here in 1955. Following the foundation of East Germany in 1949 and the creation of a state forest authority, organised forestry was once again carried out on the Scharfenstein. In 1955, the first wooden barracks was established here thanks to its close proximity to the Inner German Border. The old forester's lodge was demolished in 1960 and, in 1969, a new barracks was built for the East German border troops. This, in turn, fell victim to the demolition ball in 1999 and the area was renaturalised as part of the National Park. In 2002 the present park ranger station with two log cabins was opened roughly where the former barracks had been.

== Hiking ==
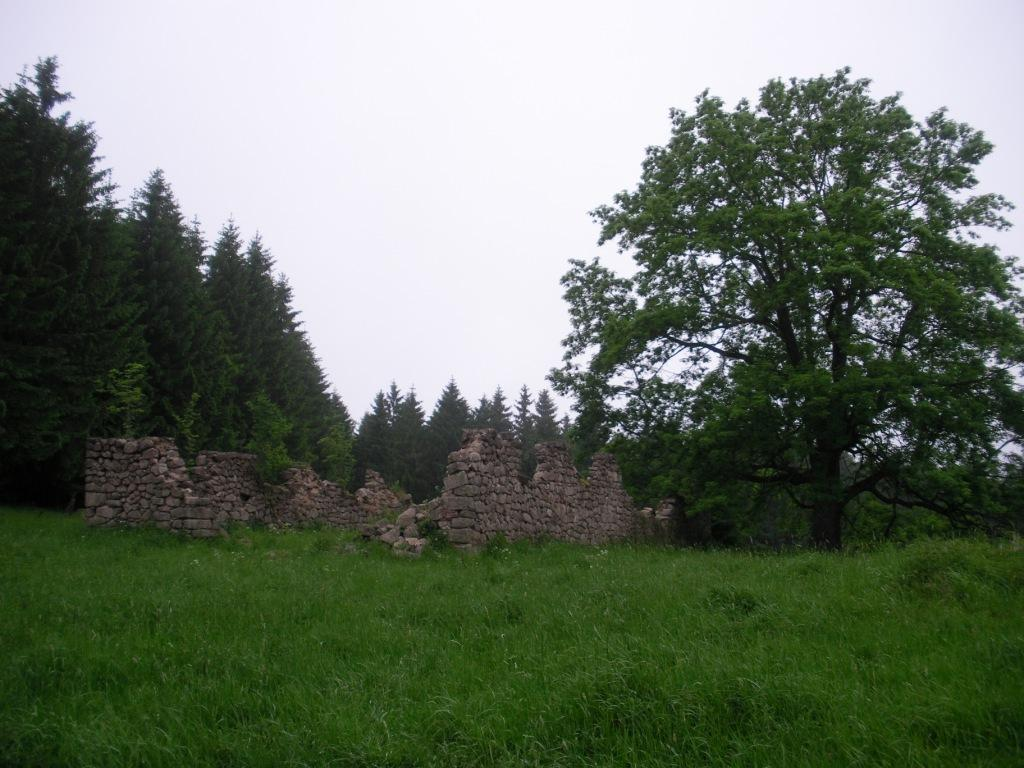
Ruins of the old cattle farm at the Scharfenstein

The Scharfenstein ranger station is part of the system of checkpoints (No. 2) in the Harzer Wandernadel walking trail network.

Immediately next to the ranger station, a narrow signposted path leads to the summit, the walk taking about 15 minutes. The same route must be used on the way down, because it is in the middle of the Harz National Park and visitors may not leave the paths. South of the Scharfenstein begins the Herdsman's Path (Hirtenstieg) which runs past the Kleiner Brocken on an old concrete road that was built to monitor the former inner German Border to the west and that leads up to the Brocken.

== See also ==
- Hiking trails in Germany
