= Ulrich Schulze =

German footballer (born 1947)

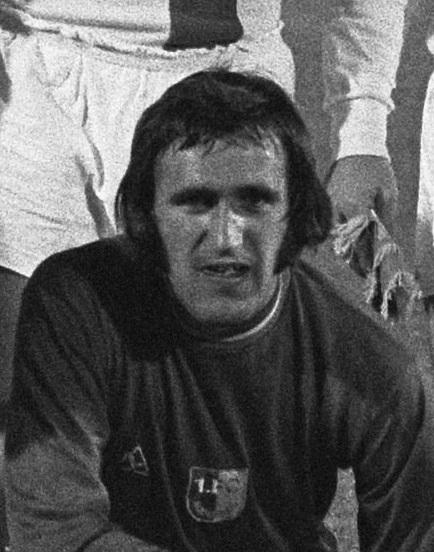
- Schulze in 1973

Personal information
- Date of birth: 25 December 1947 (age 78)
- Place of birth: Darlingerode, Germany
- Position: Goalkeeper

Youth career
- 1954–1960: SG Darlingerode
- 1960–1964: Lokomotive Halberstadt
- 1964–1966: Lokomotive Leipzig

Senior career*
Years	Team	Apps	(Gls)
1966–1968	Lokomotive Leipzig	14	(0)
1968–1976	Magdeburg	138	(0)
1976–1982	BSG Stahl Blankenburg		

International career
1974	East Germany	1	(0)

Managerial career
- 1982–1985: BSG Stahl Blankenburg
- 1985–1988: Stahl Thale
- 1988–1989: Wismut Aue
- SD Croatia Berlin
- FSV Lok/Altmark Stendal
- Neustrelitz
- 2006: Vllaznia
- * Club domestic league appearances and goals

Ulrich "Ulli" Schulze (born 25 December 1947) is a German football manager and former player. A goalkeeper, he made one appearance for the East Germany national team.

== Club career ==
Schulze grew up in the small municipality of Darlingerode near Wernigerode. In 1954 he began to play football at local club SG Darlingerode. When he was 13 years old, Schulze joined nearby club BSG Lok Halberstadt. Four years later, in 1964, Schulze moved to DDR-Oberliga side SC Leipzig. Here he won ten call-ups to the youth national team and in the 1966–67 season he played his first senior season with the club that had been reformed as 1. FC Lokomotive Leipzig in the meantime. After 14 Oberliga matches, Schulze moved to 1. FC Magdeburg for the 1968–69 season where he would alternate with Hans-Georg Moldenhauer until finally establishing himself as regular goalkeeper in the 1971–72 season. With 1. FC Magdeburg, Schulze won three Oberliga championships, won the 1973 FDGB-Pokal and was in the Magdeburg team that beat A.C. Milan in the UEFA Cup Winners' Cup on 8 May 1974, winning the competition.

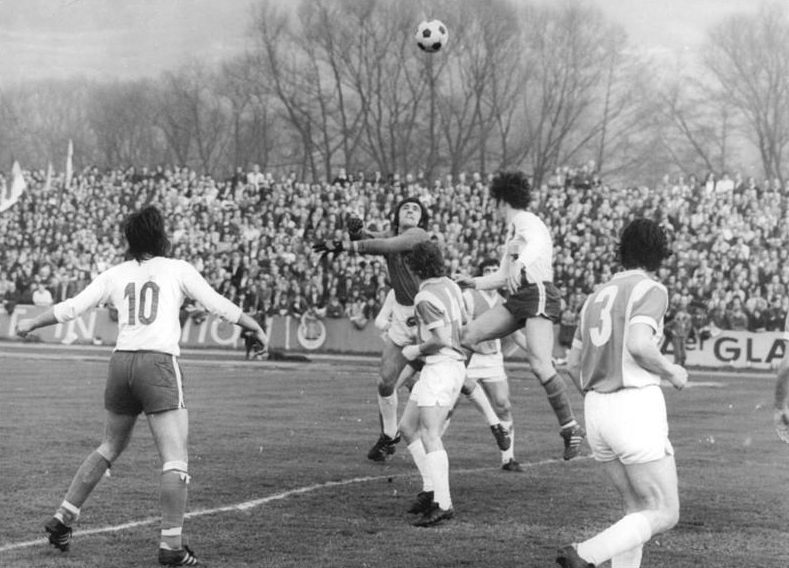
Schulze (center) in 1974

After 138 Oberliga matches for Magdeburg Schulze moved to second-tier side BSG Stahl Blankenburg where he ended his career in 1982.

== International career ==
On 12 October 1974, Schulze played in the European Championships qualifier against Iceland in Magdeburg, a 1-all draw. He earned this call-up as Jürgen Croy's back-up by good performances in the week before. But as Hans-Ulrich Grapenthin soon took over the role as back-up goalkeeper, Schulze never earned another call-up.

== Managerial career ==
After his playing days were over, Schulze took over managing Stahl Blankenburg, staying with the club until 1985, when he took over Stahl Thale. In 1987, he won promotion to the second-tier DDR-Liga, but soon thereafter left for Wismut Aue, an Oberliga club he managed until December 1989. Following German reunification he managed SD Croatia Berlin, Lok Stendal and TSG Neustrelitz. In 2006, he went abroad and briefly managed the Albanian club KS Vllaznia Shkodër. His last job to date was managing the U19 team of 1. FC Neubrandenburg 04 that competes in the second-highest youth league.
