= Joseph Cross (tower) =

Coordinates: 51°34′50″N 11°00′20″E

- Josephskreuz
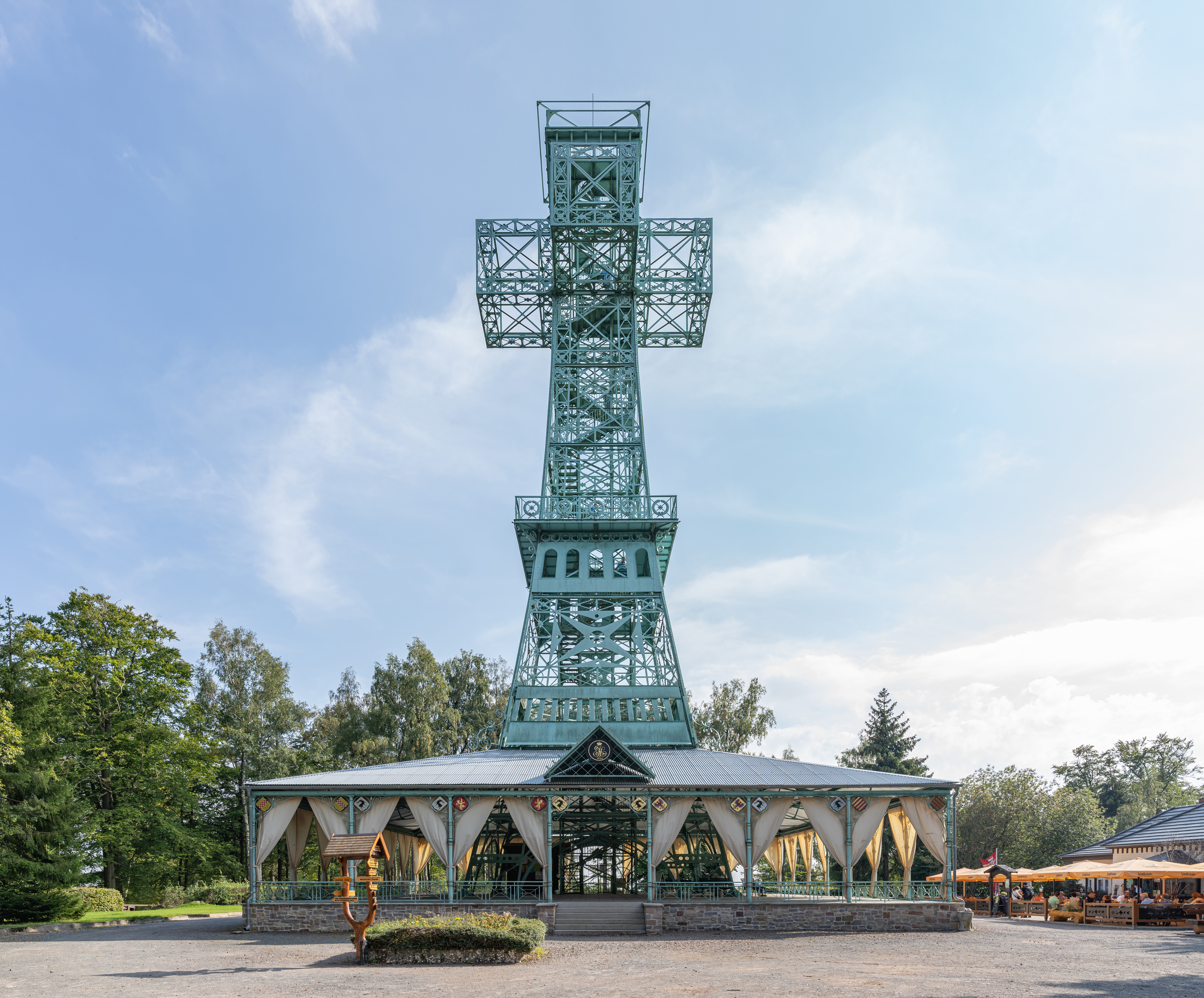
- The Joseph Cross
- Interactive map of Joseph Cross
- Location: Stolberg (Harz)
- Type: Observation tower
- Material: Steel
- Height: 38 m (125 ft)
- Weight: 125 t (123 long tons; 138 short tons)
- Opening date: 9 August 1896

The Joseph Cross (German: Josephskreuz) is an observation tower in form of a double cross on the 580-metre-high Großer Auerberg near Stolberg (Harz), Germany. The Joseph Cross is a steel framework construction with a height of 38 m (125 ft) and a weight of 125 t (123 long tons; 138 short tons), which was built between 20 April 1896 and 9 August 1896. The Joseph Cross is open for visitors after it was closed from 1987 to 1990.

== History ==
In the 17th century there was a timber-framed observation tower on the Auerberg that was demolished in 1768 due to disrepair and weather damage.

In 1832, Count Joseph of Stolberg-Stolberg commissioned the Berlin architect Karl Friedrich Schinkel to design a new tower, which a carpenter from Stolberg carried out. The topping out ceremony of Schinkel's wooden tower, built in the form of a double cross, was celebrated on 24 September 1833. On 21 June 1834, the tower was officially opened and named the "Joseph Cross" after its client. The tower had no steps and could only be climbed by a ladder. In 1850 the cross-arms had to be renewed. In June 1880, the building was destroyed by lightning during a thunderstorm.

Construction of a new Joseph Cross, designed by Otto Beißwänger, began on 20 April 1896. The tower took its shape of a double-cross from the original by Schinkel, but was, however, designed along the lines of Paris' Eiffel Tower as a steel-framed structure, even components such as the arches between the legs being copied. The cost of 50,000 marks was born by the House of Stolberg and the Harz Club. On 9 August 1896 the new Joseph Cross was inaugurated.

In the 20th century, the cross fell into ruin until it was closed to visitors in 1987 due its state of disrepair. In 1989 renovation was started and it was reopened on 28 August 1990.

After a second restoration in 2003, the cross was reopened in the spring of 2004. In 2018/2019, thanks to a contribution from the European Agricultural Fund for Rural Development, the so-called "Turmhalle" (Tower Hall) at the base of the tower was renovated.

== Gallery ==
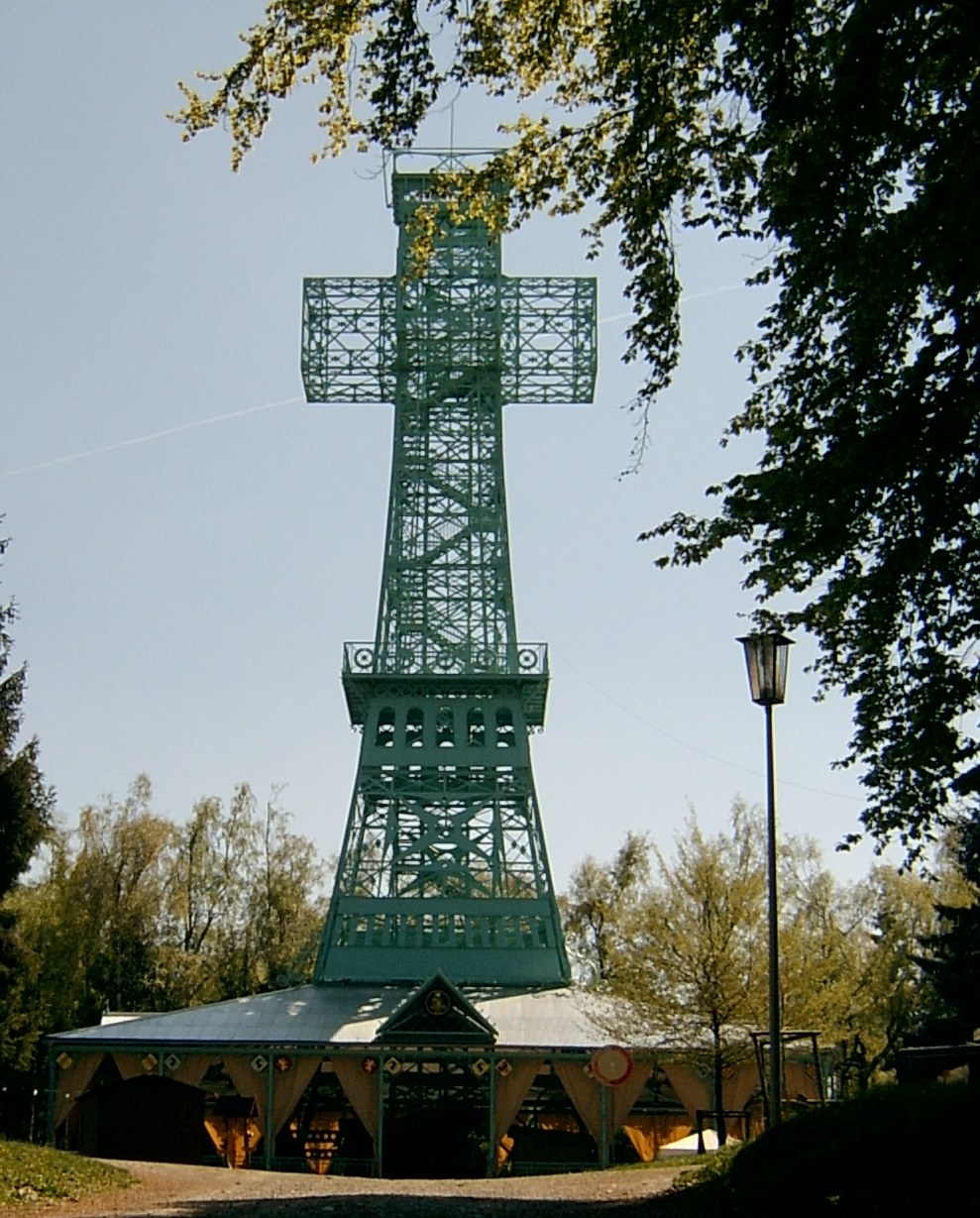

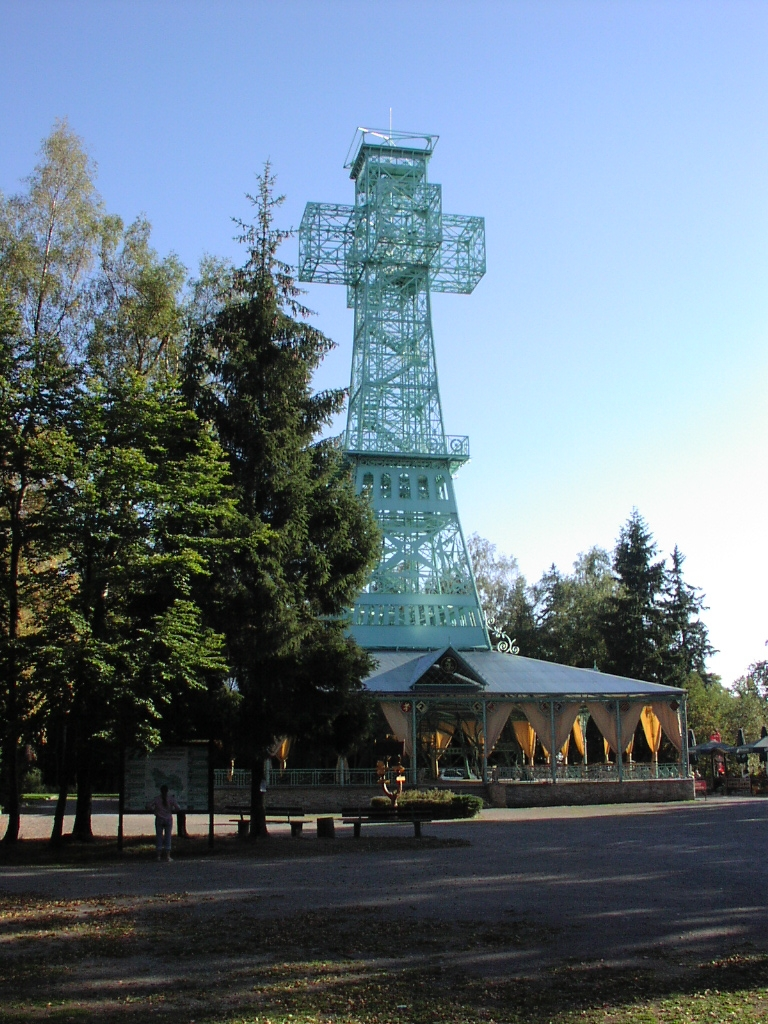

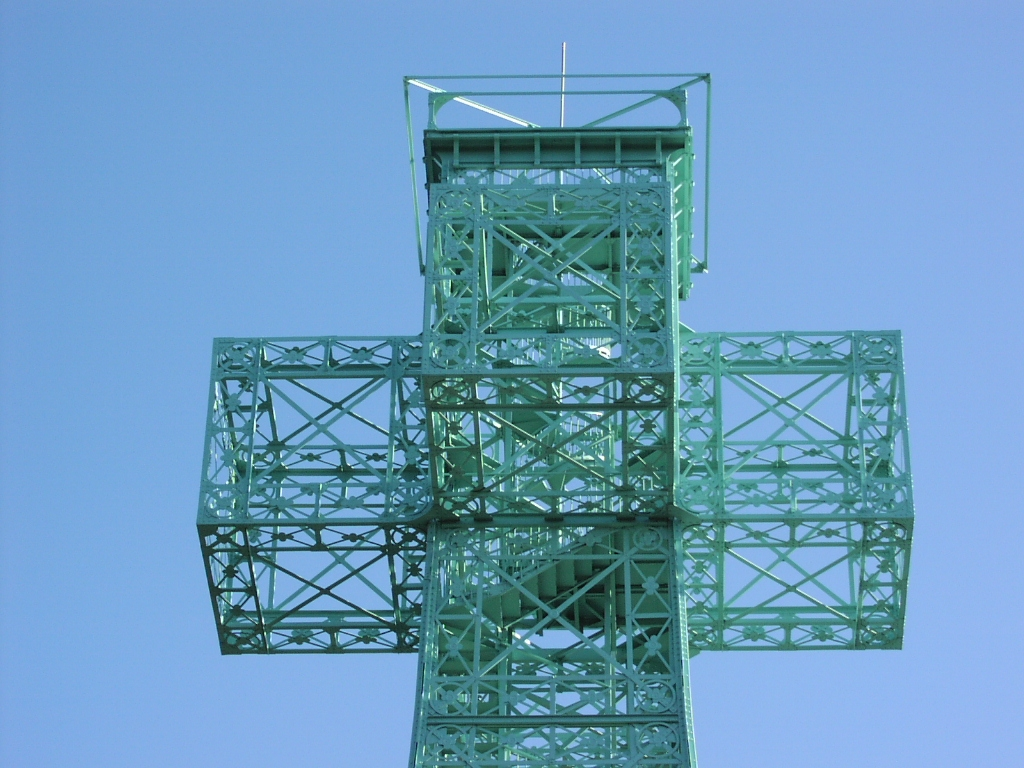
Top of the cross

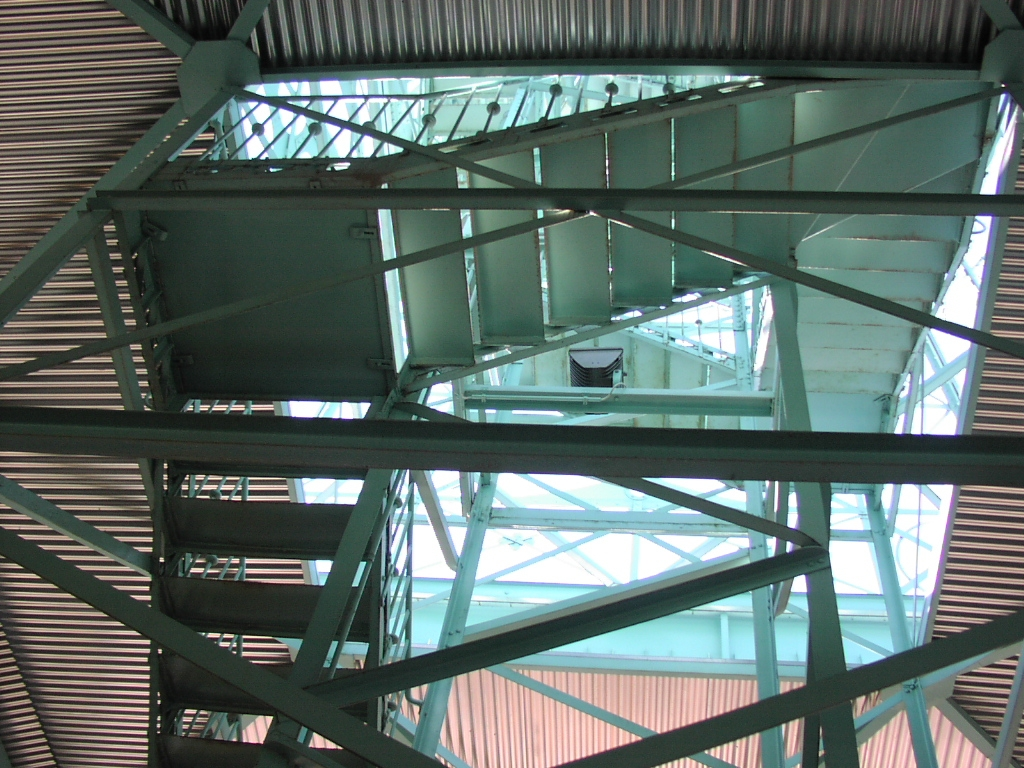
Steps to the observation platform

== Miscellaneous ==
In the Little Harz Miniature Park in Wernigerode a model of Joseph Cross on a scale of 1:25 is exhibited.

== See also ==
- List of towers
