= Bode Valley Gondola Lift =

Coordinates: 51°44′06″N 11°01′42″E

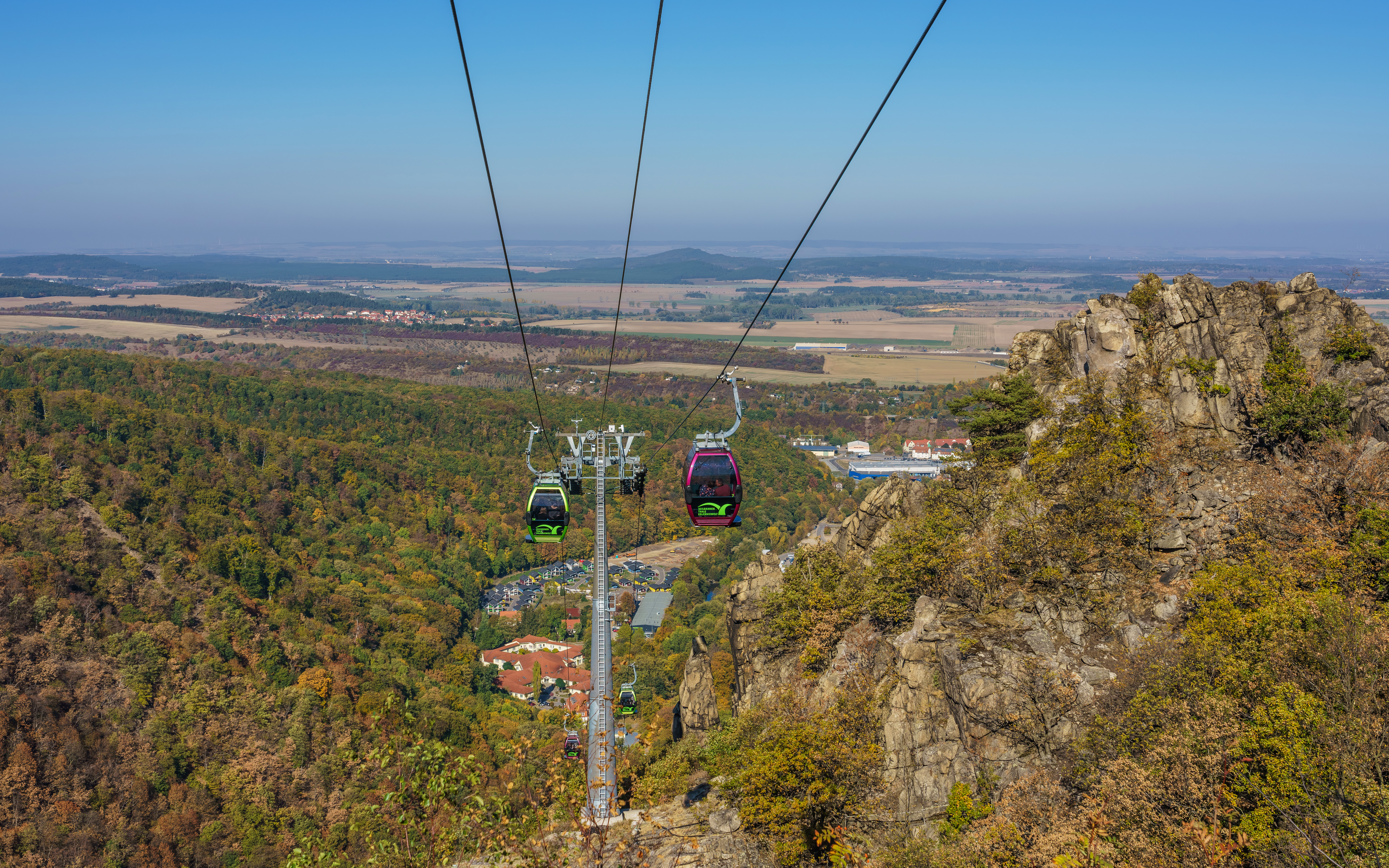
Bode Valley Gondola Lift

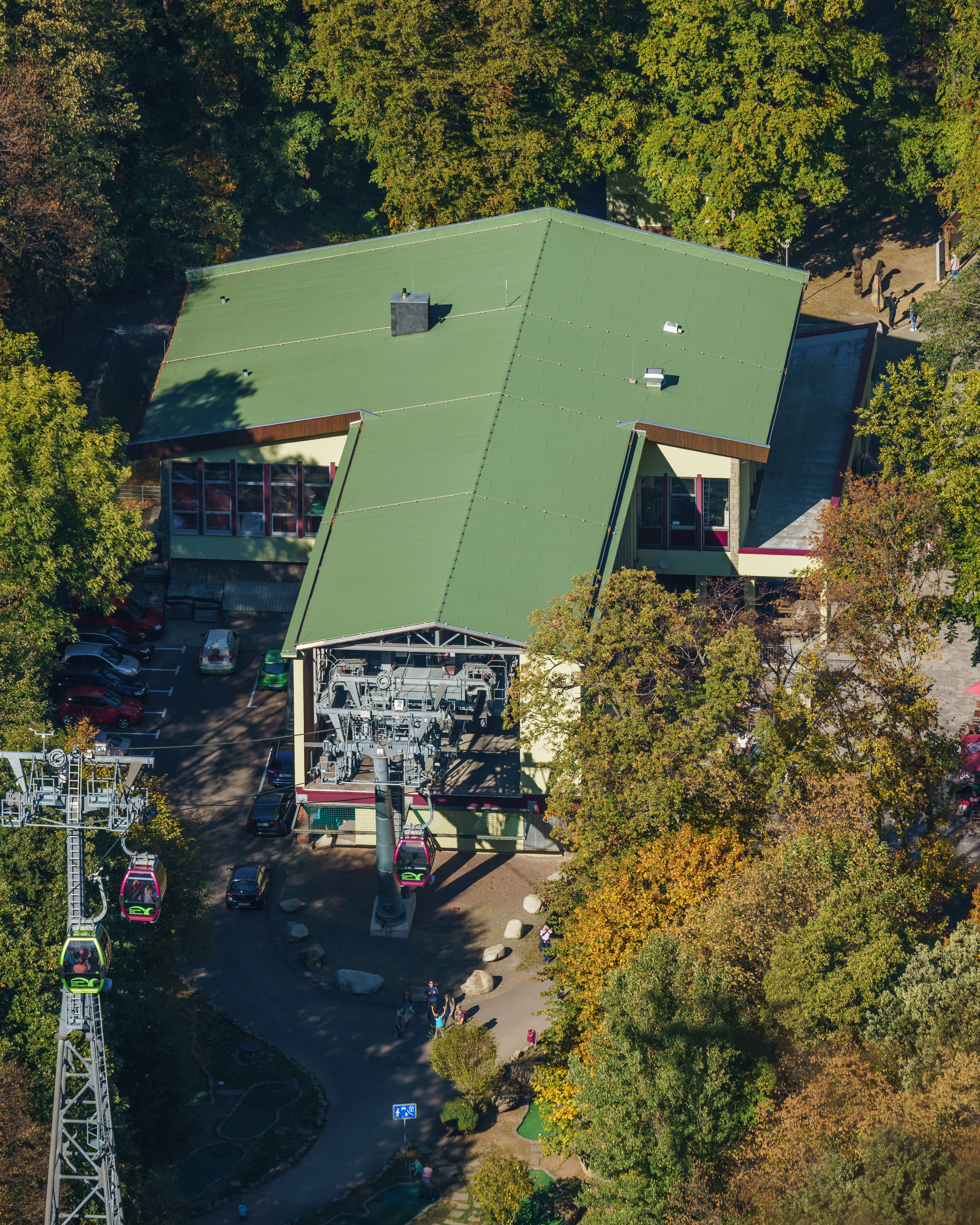
The station in Thale

The Bode Valley Gondola Lift (German: Bodetal-Seilbahn) is a gondola lift built between 1969 and 1970 by the Czechoslovak collective combine Transporta Chrudim as a joint project with PGH Elektrotherm Quedlinburg in the vicinity of Thale in the Harz mountains in Lower Saxony, Germany. It runs from its valley station at a height of 183 metres (600 ft) above sea level to the top station on the plateau of Hexentanzplatz ("Witch's Dancing Place"), which is 428 metres (1,404 ft) high. The 721 metres (788 yd) long, twin cable, gondola lift has inclines of up to 75 per cent in places. It has a total of 3 pylons, the lowest in the Bode valley having a height of 45 metres (148 ft). The other two pylons are designed for the gondola cabins to run over the top of them because of the steep inclines. The lift has 38 small cabins or 'gondolas', each with a capacity of 6 persons. The Bode Valley Gondola Lift operates all-year round (except for November). The cost is €3 for adults one-way (as of August 2011).

== See also ==
- Wurmberg Gondola Lift
