= Darlingerode =

- Stadtteil of Ilsenburg
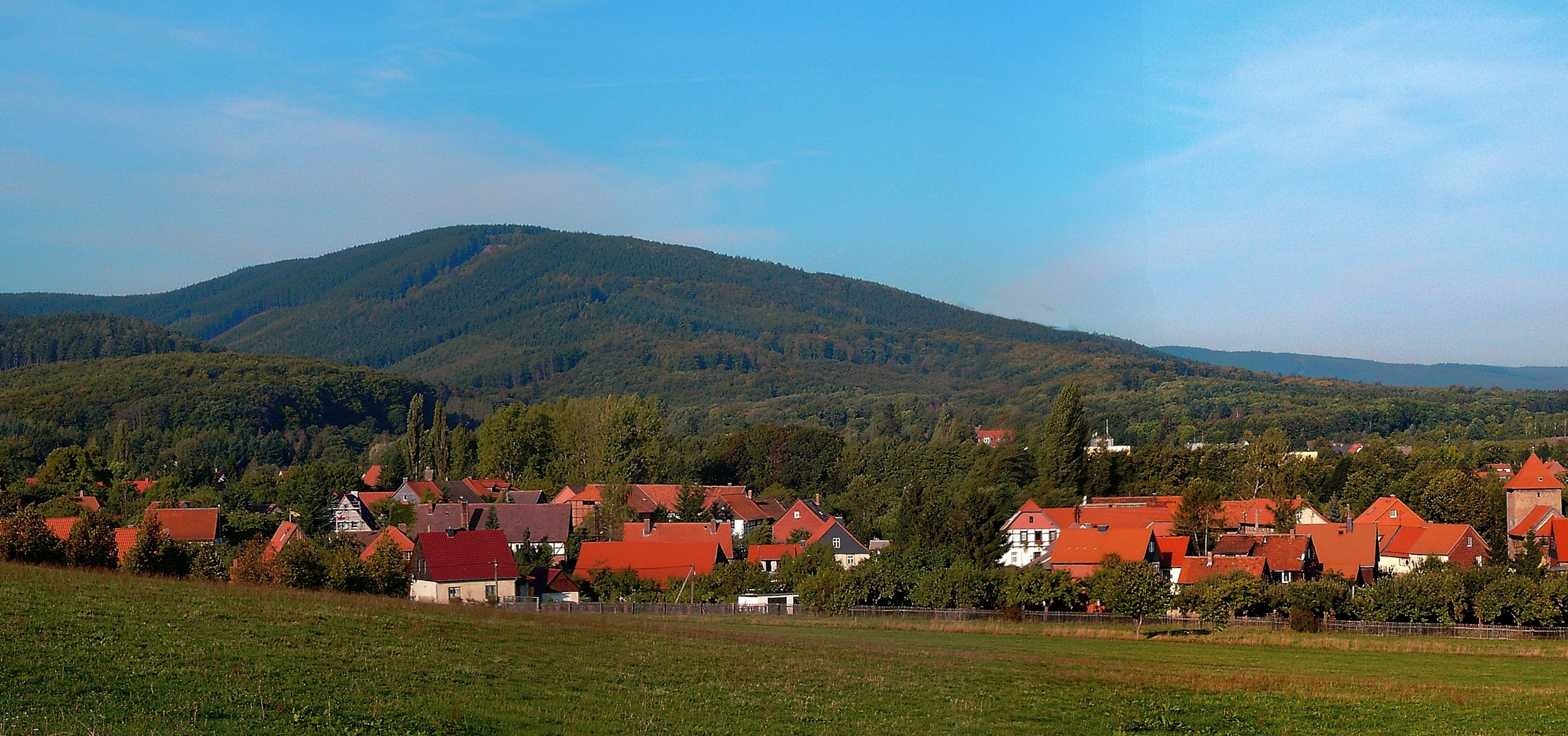
- View towards the Harz mountains

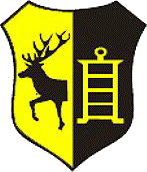
- Coat of arms
- Interactive map of Darlingerode
- Location within Germany Location within Saxony-Anhalt
- Coordinates: 51°50′55″N 10°43′53″E
- Country: Germany
- State: Saxony-Anhalt
- District: Harz
- Town: Ilsenburg

Area
  - Total: 6.47 km^{2} (2.50 sq mi)
- Elevation: 265 m (869 ft)

Population (2018-12-31)
  - Total: 2,517
  - Density: 389/km^{2} (1,010/sq mi)
- Time zone: UTC+01:00 (CET)
  - Summer (DST): UTC+02:00 (CEST)
- Postal codes: 38871
- Dialling codes: 03943
- Vehicle registration: HZ
- Website: stadt-ilsenburg.de

Darlingerode (German pronunciation: [ˌdaʁlɪŋəˈʁoːdə]) is a village and a former municipality in the district of Harz, in Saxony-Anhalt, Germany. On 1 July 2009, it was incorporated into the town of Ilsenburg.

== Geography ==
It is situated at the northern edge of the Harz mountain range on the road from Ilsenburg and Drübeck to the town of Wernigerode in the east. The village has approximately 2.400 inhabitants, it consists of the southern part Darlingerode proper and the northern Altenrode.

Darlingerode station is a stop on the Heudeber-Danstedt–Bad Harzburg/Vienenburg railway line.

== History ==
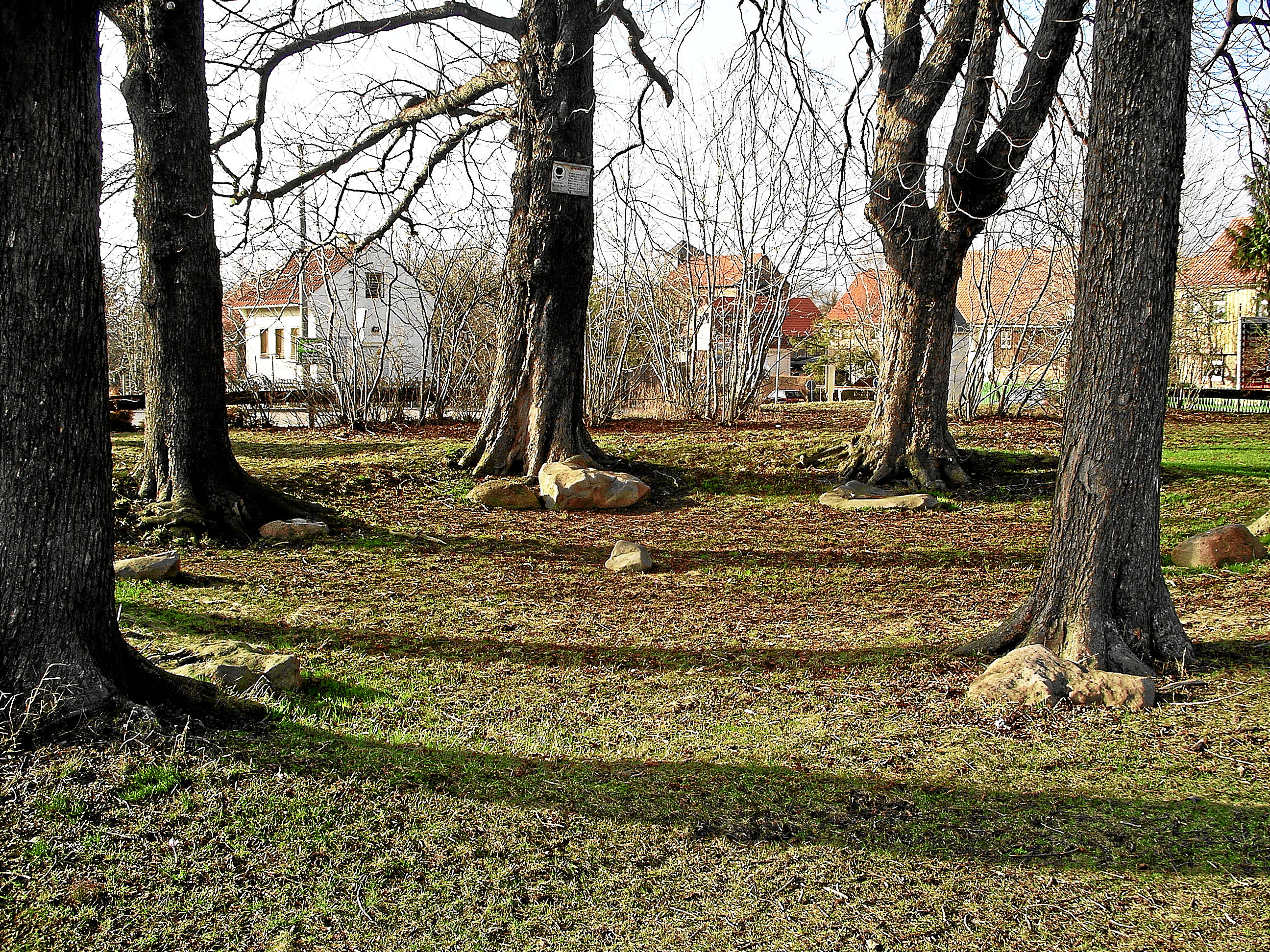
Stone circle

The village was known as Turincwartesrot in early medieval times, since, according to a 12th-century entry, a man called Turincwart settled down here and inherited or donated the place to the Fulda monastery, between 780 and 820. It was possibly deserted for a long time - the first time the settlement again appeared is 5 May 1086, in a document of Bishop Burchard II of Halberstadt. This date is regarded as the foundation of the village, and consequently the 900-year-jubilee was celebrated in 1986.

The inhabitants lived on arable farming, but also on mining in the Harz mountains. It is assumed that Emperor Otto III held a court's day at an early medieval stone circle in Darlingerode. The foundations of the Romanesque village church, first mentioned in 1086, also date back to the Ottonian era. The estates belonged to the County of Wernigerode; from 1429, they were held by the Counts of Stolberg.

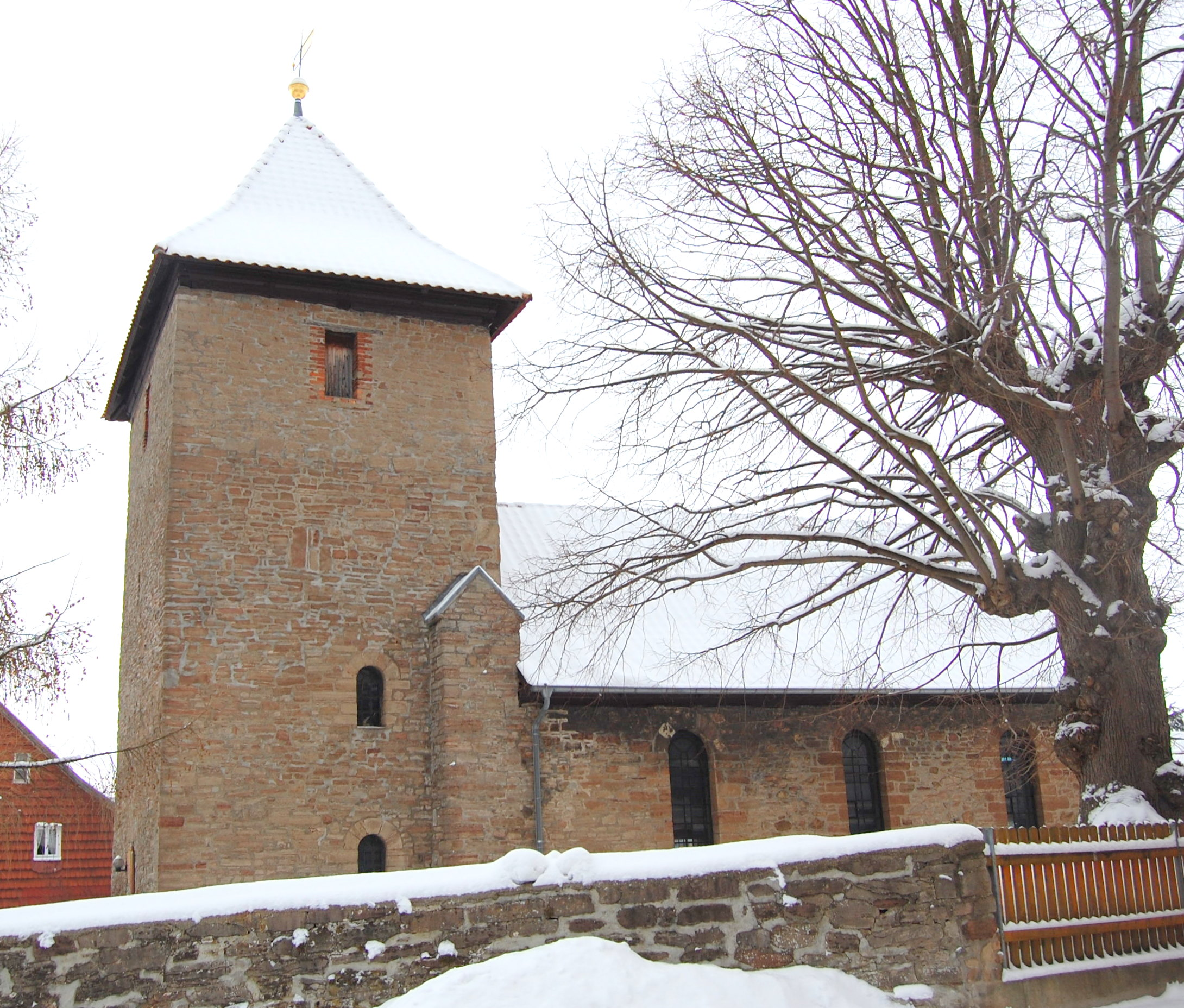
Village church

On 6 August 1517, Martin Luther visited Himmelpforten Abbey near the village, where he debated with the head of his order, Johann von Staupitz, about the so-called sale of indulgences. This may be a legend, nevertheless a memorial stone was erected 400 years later here. In the German Peasants' War of 1525, the monastery was taken and nearly destroyed by insurgents from Darlingerode and Wernigerode, the monks fled, returned for some decades, but left it in the end. Nowadays just some remains of the outer walls are to be seen.

During the Thirty Years' War, the area was repeatedly devastated by Imperial troops under Wallenstein and Tilly as well as by Swedish forces. The inhabitants probably were connected with people who fled into the near woods and defied the plundering troops, the Harzschützen movement.

After the dissolution of the Holy Roman Empire and the Napoleonic Wars, the Counts of Counts of Stolberg-Wernigerode became mediatized princes in the Prussian province of Saxony.

== Notable people ==
- Ulrich Schulze (born 1947), footballer
