= Drübeck =

- Stadtteil of Ilsenburg
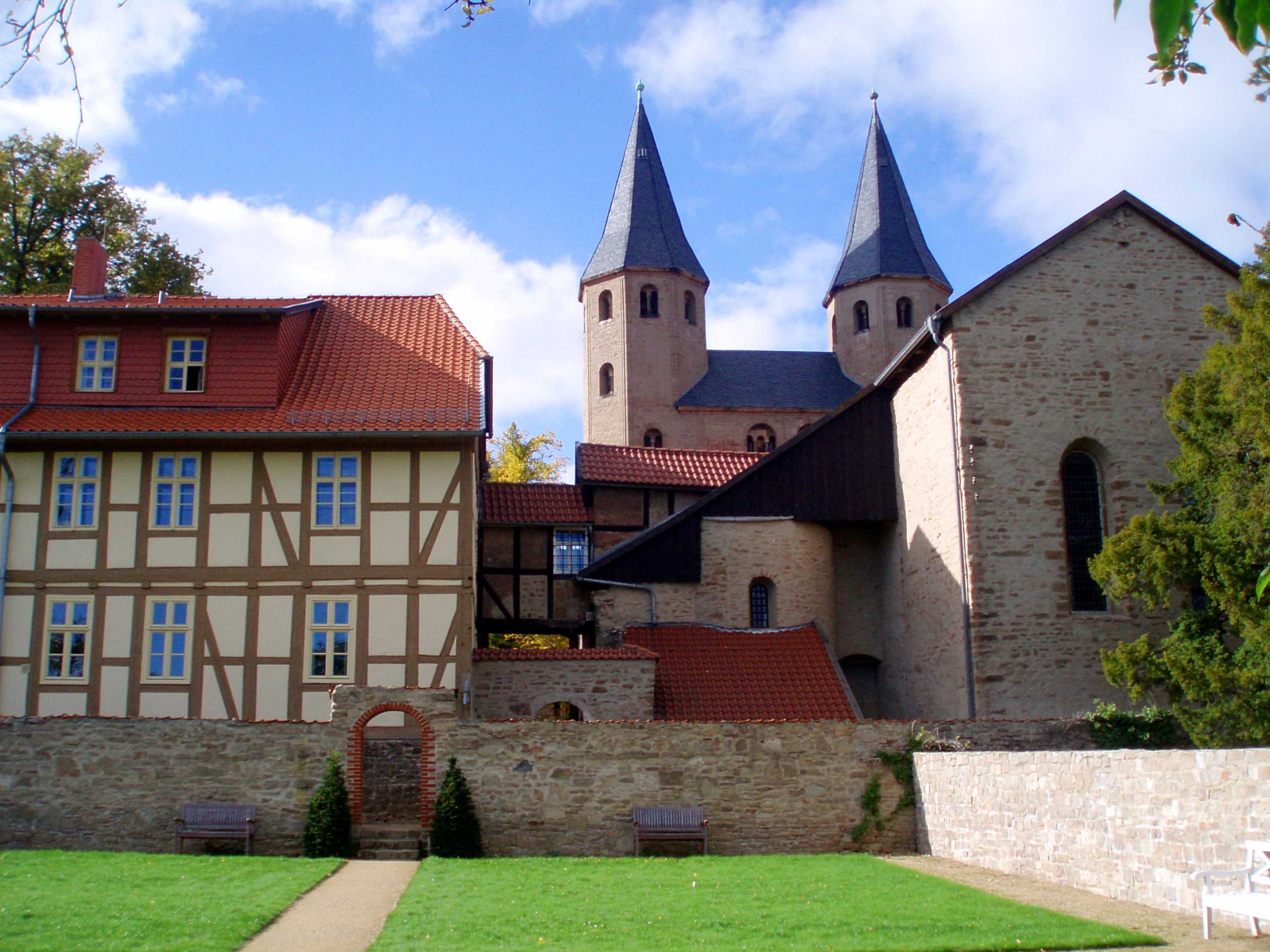
- Drübeck Abbey

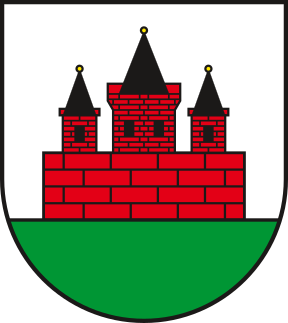
- Coat of arms
- Interactive map of Drübeck
- Location within Germany Location within Saxony-Anhalt
- Coordinates: 51°51′23″N 10°42′46″E
- Country: Germany
- State: Saxony-Anhalt
- District: Harz
- Town: Ilsenburg

Area
  - Total: 14.16 km^{2} (5.47 sq mi)
- Elevation: 258 m (846 ft)

Population (2006-12-31)
  - Total: 1,481
  - Density: 104.6/km^{2} (270.9/sq mi)
- Time zone: UTC+01:00 (CET)
  - Summer (DST): UTC+02:00 (CEST)
- Postal codes: 38871
- Dialling codes: 039452, 03943
- Vehicle registration: HZ
- Website: stadt-ilsenburg.de

Drübeck (German pronunciation: [ˈdʁyːbɛk]) is a village and a former municipality in the district of Harz, in Saxony-Anhalt, Germany. Since 1 July 2009, it is part of the town Ilsenburg.

== Abbey ==
It is the site of a former monastery of nuns of the Order of Saint Benedict, first mentioned as Drubechi ("Three Brooks") in a 960 deed by Emperor Otto I. At this time, the Romanesque abbey church was built, today a landmark at the Romanesque tourist route (Straße der Romanik) of Saxony-Anhalt. After the monastery became extinct in the Thirty Years' War, the estates were acquired by the Counts of Stolberg-Wernigerode, who established a Protestant congregation of canonesses here in 1732, now a conference centre of the Evangelical Church of the Church Province of Saxony.
