= Harz Club =

Hiking club in Germany

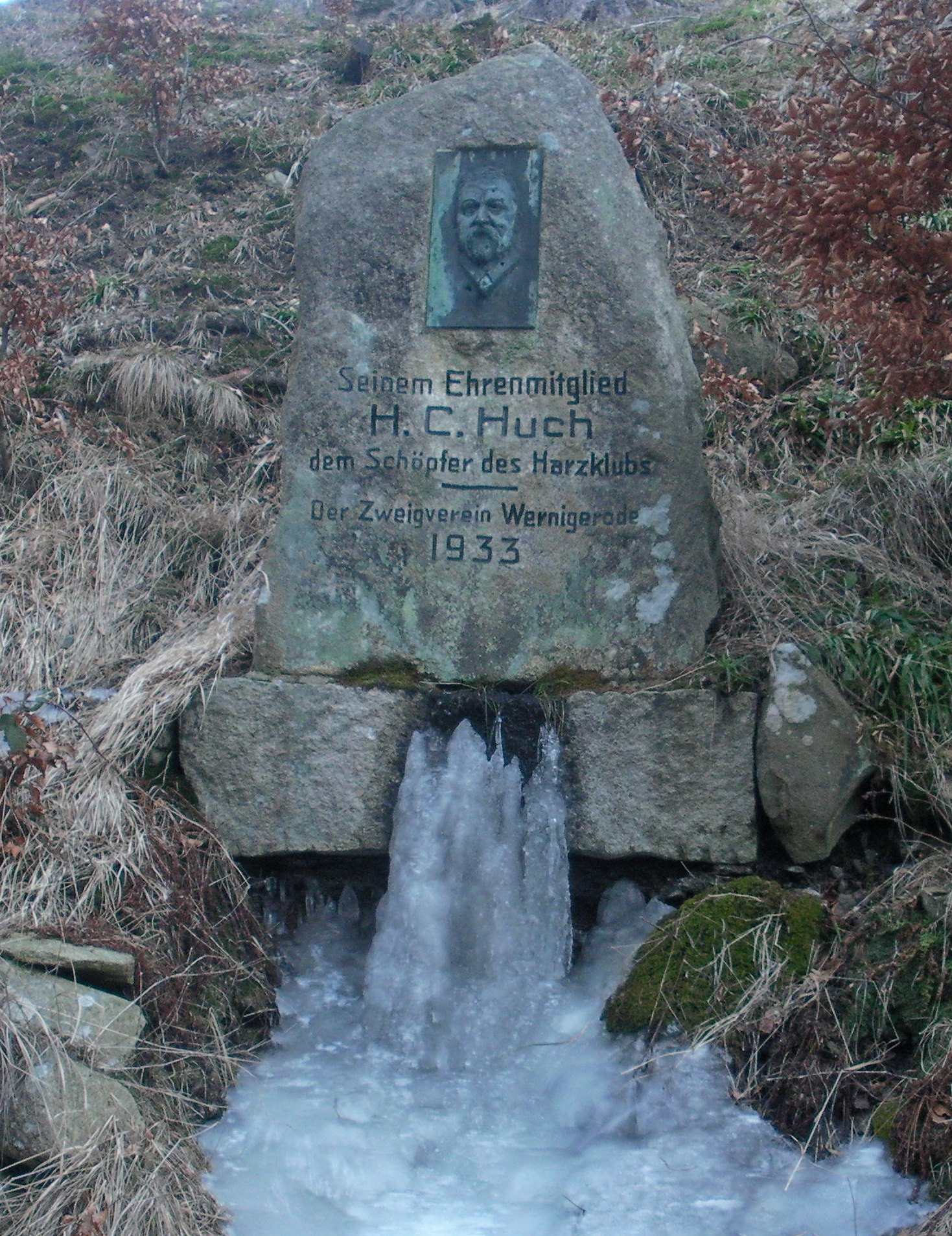
Monument to the co-founder of the Harz Club, Heinrich Conrad Huch, on the Steinerne Renne

The Harz Club (German: Harzklub) is club dedicated to maintaining the traditions of the Harz mountains in Germany and looking after the walking trails in the Harz. It was founded in 1886 in Seesen and as of 2022 the club has about 16,000 members in approximately 90 branches.

== History ==
The Harz Club was founded on 8 August 1886 in Seesen. The railway director, Albert Schneider, was its first chairman. One of the co-founders was Carl Reuß. Its first task was to open up the Harz to walkers and tourists. Later, numerous local history groups were started and it took on the maintenance of Harz traditions. Nature conservation was added to its articles as an important aim in 1907. Before the outbreak of the Second World War membership stood at almost 20,000 in 120 branches.

Following the division of the Harz, the development of the Harz Nature Park became the priority within the western zone. In East Germany the Harz Club was banned as an organisation, similar functions were entrusted to the subordinate levels of the Cultural Association of the GDR.

After German reunification over 40 branches were founded in the Harz region of the new federal states of Saxony-Anhalt and Thuringia. In 1994 the club's name was changed into the Local History, Walking and Nature Conservation Association (Heimat-, Wander- und Naturschutzbund).

Its main chairman is Michael Ermrich, chief executive of the district of Harz. The Harz Club maintains an office in Clausthal-Zellerfeld and is a member of the Federation of German Mountain and Walking Clubs (Verband Deutscher Gebirgs- und Wandervereine).

== Tasks ==
The Harz Club sets itself the following tasks:

- Nature conservation and preservation of the countryside
- Promotion of walking; guided walks
- Publication of walking maps and walking information
- Maintenance of outdoor walking facilities (benches, huts, etc.)
- Signing of walking trails
- Local history: customs, traditional costume, dialects, folk music, yodelling
- Youth work
- Publication of the local history and members magazine Der Harz
- Promotion of local history research and archiving
- Preservation of cultural objects (loca history booths, cultural monuments in the countryside)
- Training courses and workshops
- Advertising of Harz local history and public relations

== Walking hostels ==
The Harz Club maintains four walking hostels in the Harz with overnight accommodation for families and groups in:

- Wildemann
- Bad Lauterberg – Lönsweg 12
- Torfhaus – Goetheweg
- Sonnenberg

== See also ==
- Harzer Hexenstieg
- Harzer Wandernadel — hiking network.
