= Scharfenstein (Wernigerode) =

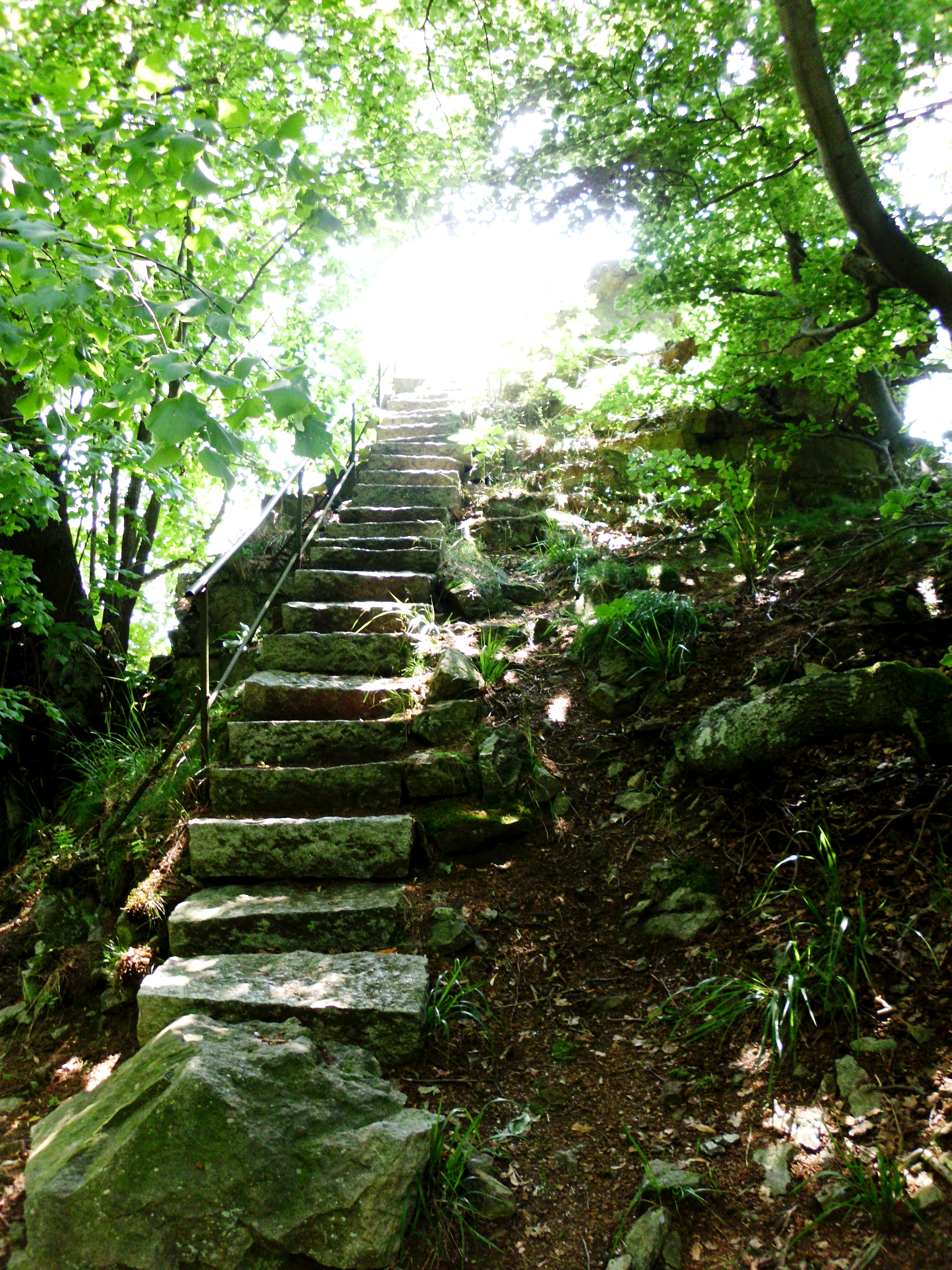

Highest point
- Elevation: 462.4 m above sea level (NN) (1,517 ft)
- Coordinates: 51°48′35″N 10°47′54″E

Geography
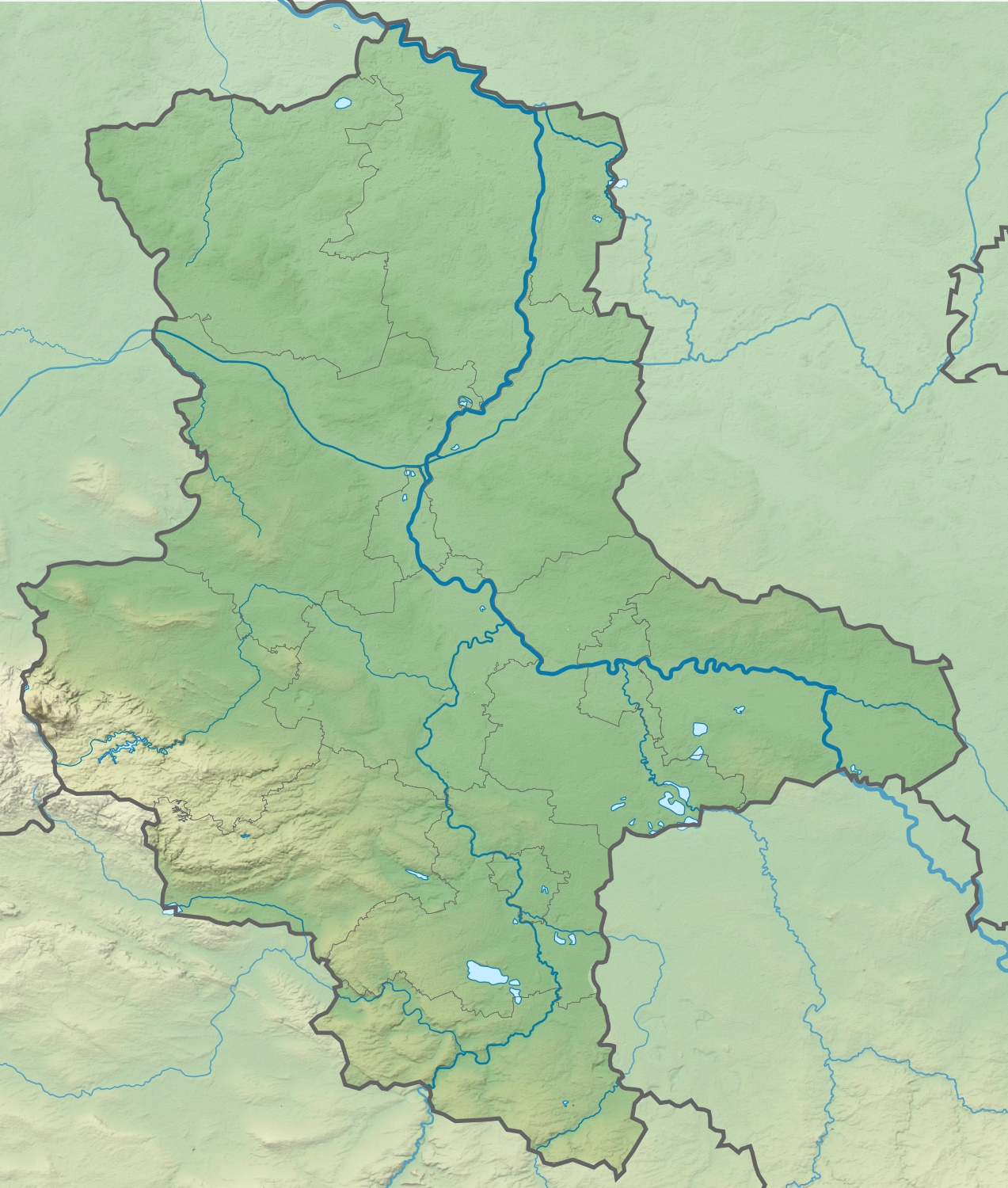
- Location within Saxony-Anhalt
- Location: Wernigerode, Harz county, Saxony-Anhalt, Germany
- Parent range: Harz (Oberharz)

The Scharfenstein is a hill spur, 462.4 m above sea level (NN), of the Eichberg-Süd (486.4 m) in the Harz Mountains of Germany, near the town of Wernigerode in the county of Harz in Saxony-Anhalt.

== Location ==
The Scharfenstein lies in the Harz/Saxony-Anhalt Nature Park on the eastern edge of the Upper Harz. It is located about 1.5 km south-southwest of Nöschenrode, a village southeast of Wernigerode. To the north a notch leads to the Eichberg-Süd and, to the east, is the Astberg (474.8 m). Towards the west and southwest the spur drops into the valley of Kalte Tal ("Cold Valley") and to the south and southeast into that of the Zillierbach stream.

There is a rock formation called the Scharfensteinklippe on the hill.

== Hiking ==
The Scharfenstein is no. 34 (Scharfenstein) in the system of checkpoints of the Harzer Wandernadel hiking network. There is a footpath to the summit from the north, from the Eichberg-Süd. From its southern end a narrow stone staircase leads to the top of the spur. From the viewing point here there are views of the Harz, notably the highest mountain, the Brocken. The return path is the same as the spur drops steeply on all sides with the exception of the route to the north.
