= Zillierbach Dam =

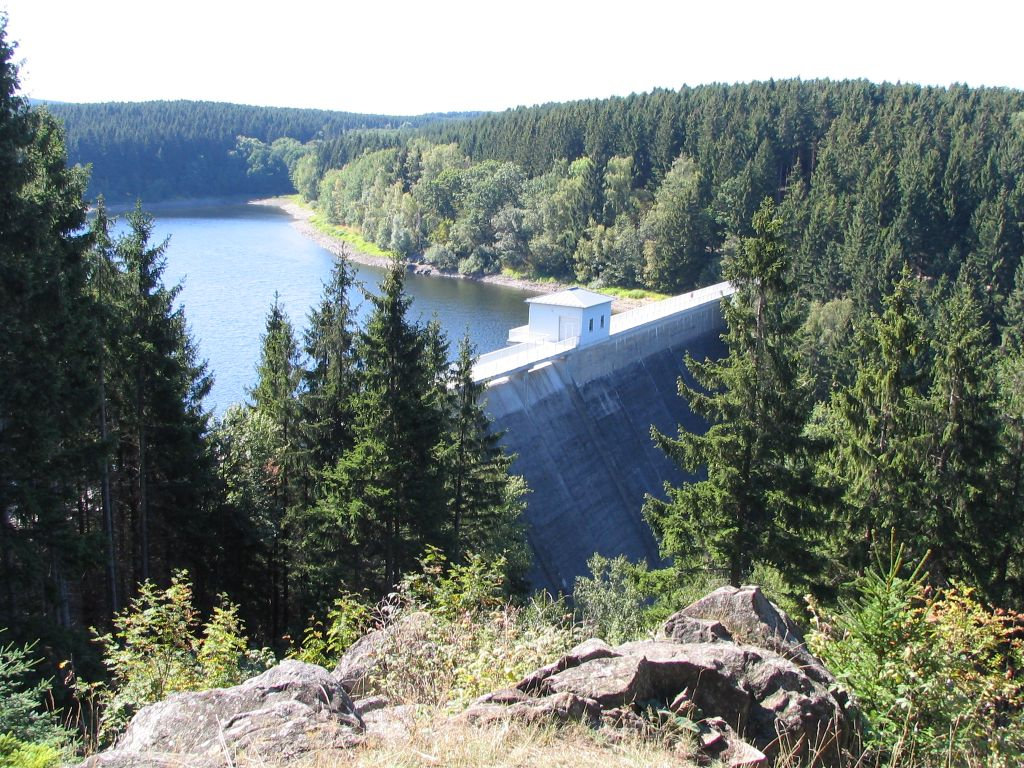

- Location within Germany
- Country: Germany
- Location: Harz
- Coordinates: 51°47′21″N 10°46′36″E
- Construction began: 1934
- Opening date: 1936

Dam and spillways
- Type of dam: Gravity dam
- Impounds: Zillierbach
- Height: 47 m (154 ft)
- Length: 186 m (610 ft)
- Width (crest): 3.5 m (11 ft)
- Dam volume: 54,000 m^{3} (1,900,000 ft^{3})

Reservoir
- Total capacity: 2,830,000 m^{3} (100,000,000 ft^{3})
- Catchment area: 10.7 km^{2} (4.1 mi^{2})

The Zillierbach Dam (German: Zillierbachtalsperre) lies in the East Harz in the German state of Saxony-Anhalt near the town of Elbingerode (Harz) and impounds the Zillierbach stream. It supplies drinking water to several villages in the High Harz (Elbingerode, Elend (Harz), Schierke, teilweise Rübeland) as well as the town of Wernigerode; it also provides flood protection.

The Zillierbach was known as the Holtemme until the 16th century, then from 1558 as the Zilgerbach. Not until much later was it given its present name. Before the construction of the dam at Peterstein, it supplied the mills in Wernigerode and in the area around Halberstadt. Its variable water supply was evened out by an artificial ditch on the south side of the Hohneklippen, the Wormsgraben, built in the late 12th century.

== Dam ==
The barrage is a concrete gravity dam. Initially it was intended to build an arch dam; but this was changed during construction. From 1998 to 2001 the dam was overhauled. In the middle of the wall is the valve house with its operating equipment.

== Construction ==
The plan to build a dam first appeared in 1931. During the early phase of construction in 1934 cult artefacts from around the turn of the eras (AD 0) were found. The construction material was delivered from Drei Annen Hohne on a railway. The aggregate was extracted locally. A sawmill was built at the inlet to the reservoir just to provide wood for the dam casing. The cost was estimated beforehand at 3.31 million Reichsmarks (equivalent to 16 million 2021 euros). The bulk of the work was completed in June 1936. 54,500 m³ of casting mortar was used. In 1937 the waterworks below the dam was taken into service.

== Overhaul and modernisation ==
After 60 years of operation the stability of the dam against collapse could no longer be guaranteed. Likewise the technical equipment was outmoded. From November 1998 to May 2000 the dam and waterworks were overhauled at a financial cost of 7 million deutsche marks. The dam crest was widened to 3.30 metres and raised by about 1 metre. The valve house on the crest was given a 1.5 m wide gangway around it. The parapet walls were replaced by a railing. Prior to the overhaul, the equipment in the valve house had to be set manually and measurements could only be made on the spot in the power station. When the dam was first built, drainage channels were laid between the wall segments which had gradually disintegrated over time. As a result, vertical boreholes were drilled to drain the water away. The waterworks was modernised and supplies 2.9 million m³ of water annually. Since the overhaul and the aforementioned modifications, the crest is now open to walkers crossing the valley. The forestry commission has also removed trees blocking the view of the southern side of the dam from the observation point at Peterstein (checkpoint 36 on the Harzer Wandernadel hiking network).

== Recreation ==
Swimming in the reservoir is forbidden in order to protect the fresh water. The reservoir is surrounded by a 4.5-km-long hiking trail. It can be reached from Drei Annen Hohne, Elbingerode or Wernigerode. A footpath leads to the nearby Peterstein mountain summit, from which there is a view over the reservoir. Trees that obscured the view were removed from the mountaintop during dam and reservoir renovation by the forestry commission.

== See also ==
- List of dams in the Harz
- List of reservoirs and dams in Germany

== Notes ==
- Dittmar Marquordt:Neuer Harzbote.Heft 5, Fremdenverkehrsverein Bodfeld/Harz, Elbingerode (Harz), 1999, S.175.
- Hugo Ehrt:Neuer Harzbote.Heft 13, Fremdenverkehrsverein Bodfeld/Harz, Elbingerode (Harz), 2003, S.565.
