= Minsleben =

Ortsteil of Wernigerode

- Ortsteil of Wernigerode
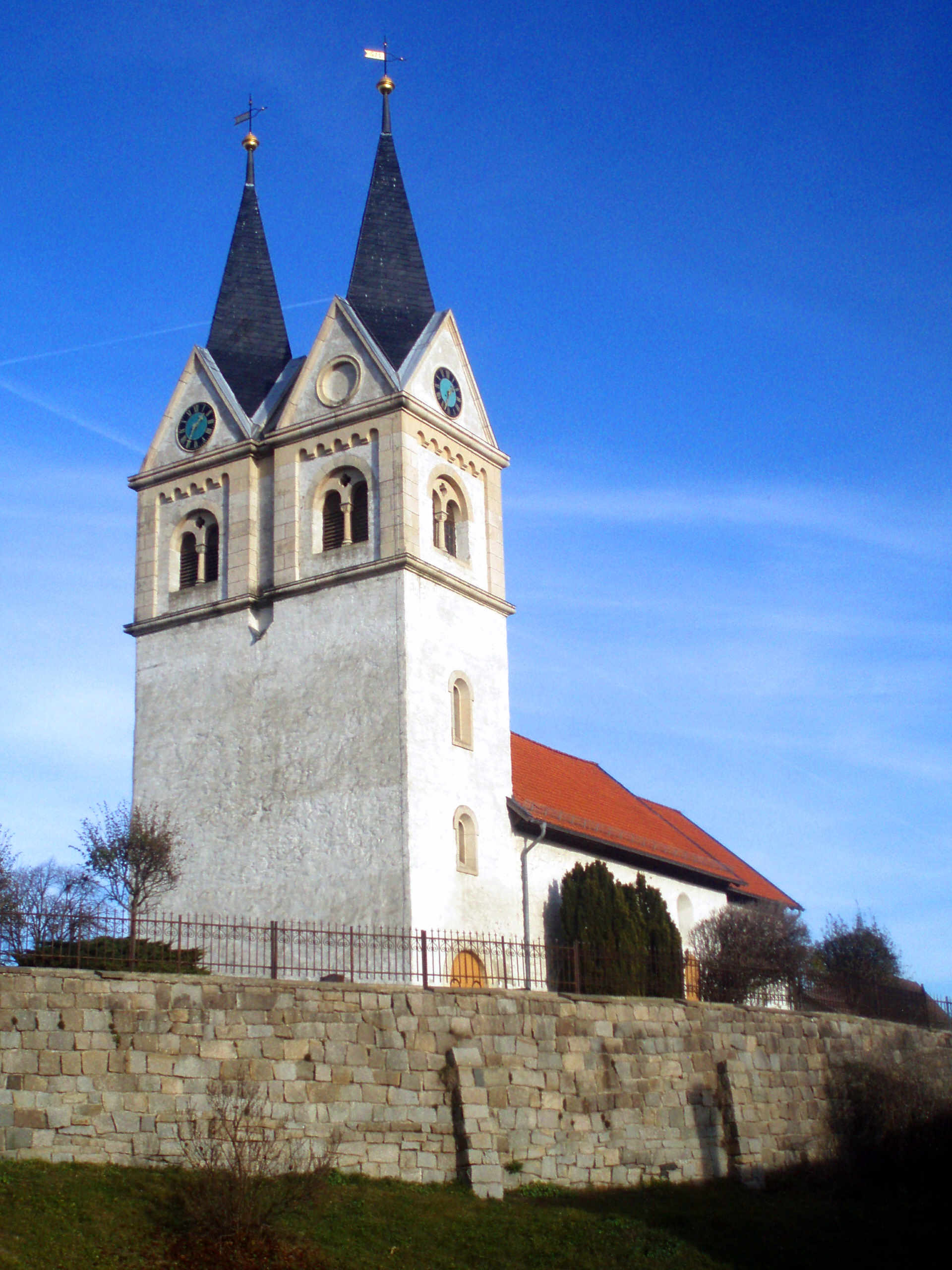
- Church of Minsleben
- Interactive map of Minsleben
- Location within Germany Location within Saxony-Anhalt
- Coordinates: 51°52′N 10°49′E
- Country: Germany
- State: Saxony-Anhalt
- District: Harz
- Town: Wernigerode
- Time zone: UTC+01:00 (CET)
  - Summer (DST): UTC+02:00 (CEST)
- Postal codes: 38855

Minsleben (German pronunciation: [mɪntsˈleːbm̩]) is a Ortsteil (district) of Wernigerode since April 1, 1993.

== Geographical position ==
Minsleben is on the northern edge of the Harz mountains in the plain open to the north. The Holtemme flows past the village. The Minsleben stop on the Heudeber-Danstedt–Vienenburg railway line has not been served since October 2006. Connecting roads lead from Minsleben to Wernigerode, Reddeber, Heudeber and Silstedt. The Hundemühle is nearby.

== History ==
The place can look back on over 1000 years of history. In the village was a noble court, which had been in the possession of the Reiffenstein family for a long time. The manor house is now partially used as a residential building, the associated park is open to the public. The manor mill can also be visited on certain days.

At the beginning of the 20th century, a Minsleben train worker cut 89 shrubs and trees along the railway line into human and animal shapes. This became an attraction for the passengers and his work was also spread and documented on postcards and in magazines.

On April 7, 1945, two American fighter-bombers attacked two passenger trains and a freight train with concentration camp inmates at Minsleben station. There were 32 fatalities and numerous seriously wounded.

== Memorials and monuments ==
- The Dorflinde on the Krugberg is under protection as a natural monument.
- Memorial stone for the 100th birthday of Emperor William I.
- Memorial stone to the 32 fatalities of an American fighter-bomber attack on three railroad trains in the station area
- Collection tomb in the "Ortsfriedhof" (local Cemetery), in which a name known Belgian is buried, who was deported to Germany during the Second World War and became a victim of forced labor.
