= Nöschenrode =

Stadtteil of Wernigerode

- Stadtteil of Wernigerode
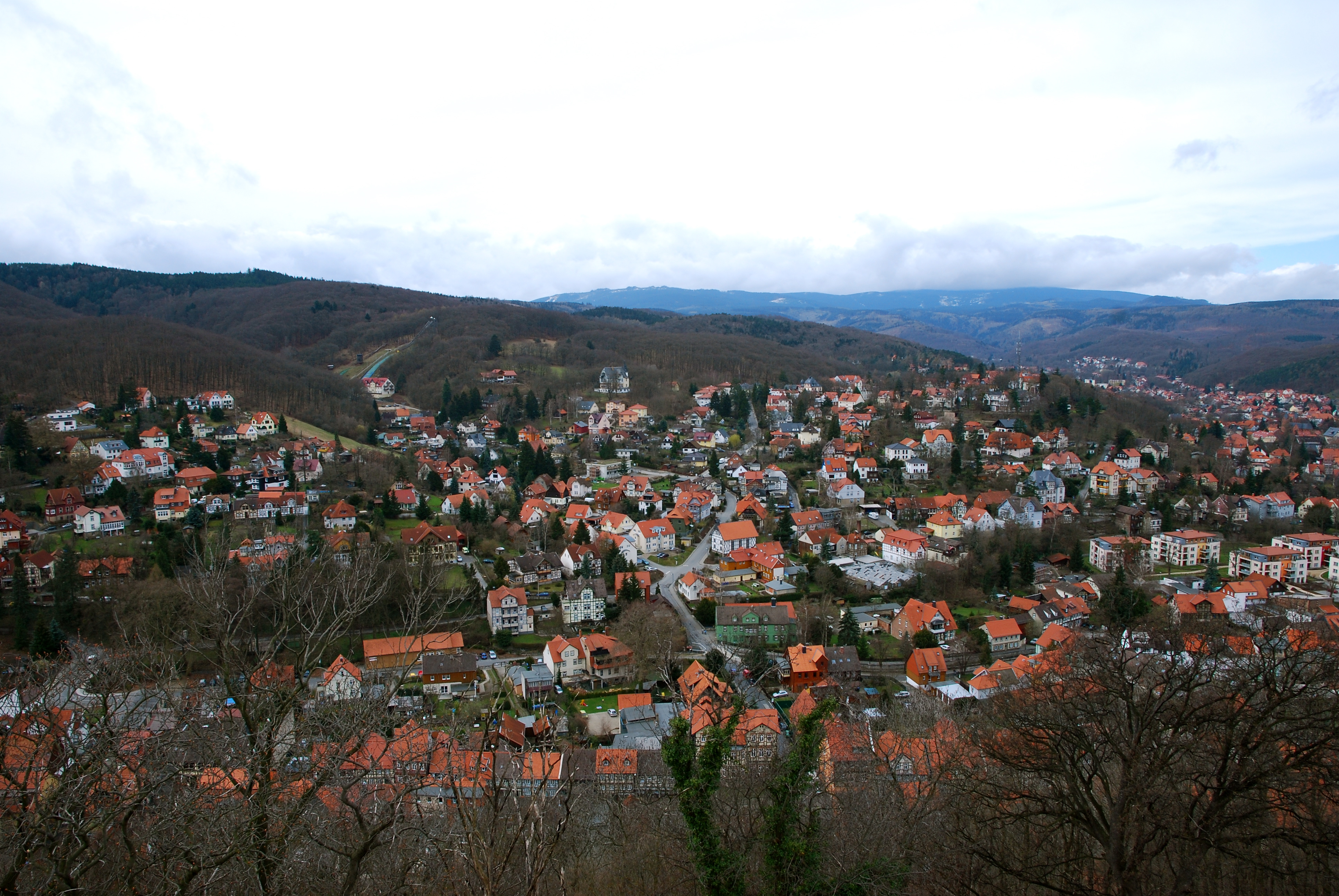
- A view over the city
- Interactive map of Nöschenrode
- Location within Germany Location within Saxony-Anhalt
- Coordinates: 51°49′37″N 10°47′40″E
- Country: Germany
- State: Saxony-Anhalt
- District: Harz
- Town: Wernigerode
- Time zone: UTC+01:00 (CET)
  - Summer (DST): UTC+02:00 (CEST)
- Postal codes: 38855
- Vehicle registration: WR; HZ

Nöschenrode (German pronunciation: [nœːʃɛn̩ˈʁoːdə]) is a Stadtteil of Wernigerode in Saxony-Anhalt, Germany.

== Geographical position ==
Nöschenrode is located at the foot of the Harz Mountains in the Mühlental. The Zillierbach, which comes from the Zillierbachtalsperre, flows through the town. The Bundesstraße 244 runs through the town.

== History ==
It got first recorded in 1370 as Noscherot in a document. The place originated below Wernigerode Castle and belonged to the County of Wernigerode. On the shoreline of the Zillierbach in the Mühlental there were several mills, which were mentioned as early as 1417, including a sawmill, oil mill and marble mill. With the preservation of wood justice, the place received an economic boom. On 30 September 1929, Nöschenrode was incorporated into Wernigerode.
