= Irene Ellenberger =

German architect

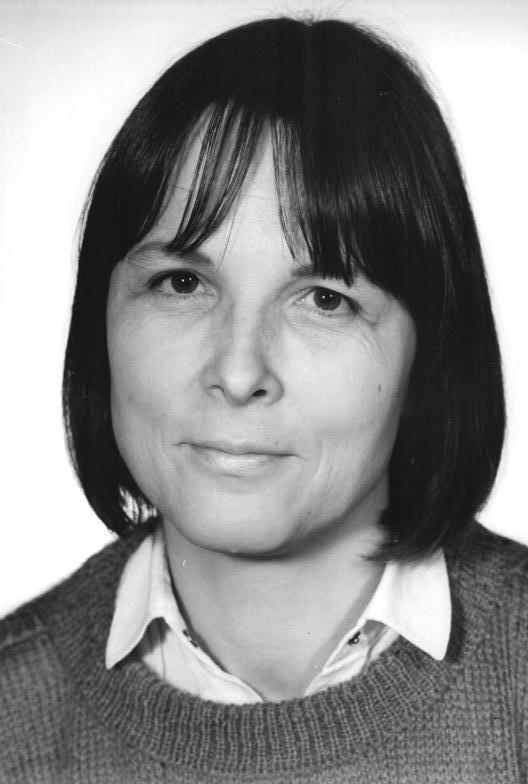
- Irene Ellenberger Elke Schöps, 1990
- Born: Irene Ruth Ellenberger; 20 April 1946 (age 80); Wernigerode, Thuringia, Soviet occupation zone in Germany
- Occupations: Architect; Politician
- Political party: New Forum 1989; SDP 1989; SPD since 1989
- Spouse: y
- Children: 2

Irene Ellenberger (born 20 April 1946) is a German architect who grew up in East Germany and who in 1990 became a politician (SDP/SPD).

Between 1994 and 1999 she served as the Minister for Health and Social Affairs (as the ministerial department was configured at that time) in Thuringia, in succession to the Christian Democrat, Frank-Michael Pietzsch. Later, between 1999 and 2004, she served as one of the two vice presidents of the Thuringia Landtag (regional legislative assembly).

== Life ==
=== Early years ===
Ellenberger was born at Wernigerode in the aftermath of the Second World War, with Wernigerode located on the western edge of the Soviet occupation zone. Her father was a civil engineer by profession. She grew up in the nearby village of Blankenberg.

She successfully completed her school leaving exam in 1964. By this time the Soviet occupation zone had been relaunched, formally in October 1949, as the German Democratic Republic. On leaving school she undertook an apprenticeship as a building worker. This was less unusual in East Germany than in some parts of Europe, since the slaughter of war in the 1940s and massive migration to the west during the 1950s had left the country with acute labour shortages in several key sectors. Nevertheless, asked about it in an interview many years later, Ellenberger confirmed that women in the construction industry were "frowned upon", but having completed her schooling at the relatively young age of 17, her options had been limited. Her father's connections in the construction sector had provided her with a training opportunity which provided a practical preparation for her subsequent career. She also confirmed that she had been aware, when embarking on an apprenticeship as a building worker, that this did not necessarily mean she would do this work throughout her career. In 1965 she moved on to the Technical Academy for Architecture and Construction at Weimar, emerging in 1971 with an engineering degree (Dipl.-Ing) which constituted the basis for her subsequent architectural career in construction. Between 1974 and 1990 Ellenberger was employed as a Project engineer.

=== Politics ===
1989 was a year of increasingly public political and social tension in East Germany. Ellenberger joined the New Forum movement during 1989, but then, as she later recalled, nothing happened. By this time she was finding her architectural work, which under the East German system she has described as a somewhat industrial process, monotonous. Towards the end of 1989, hesitantly, turned to party politics, joining the Social Democratic local branch in Weimar. Her choice of the SDP reflected both the long-standing political tradition of her family, dating back to the years before dictatorship, and her huge admiration for Willy Brandt. She later said that her move into politics reflected an urge to take care of the people of Weimar, her home town.

=== Election to the national parliament ===
Following the fall of the Berlin Wall in November 1989, the East German General Election in March 1990 offered voters more than one list of candidates. The Social Democratic Party in the GDR, which had renamed itself the SPD in Thuringia, invited Ellenberger to place her name on the party's list for the national election in order to help ensure the party met a quota requirement for female candidates that had been decreed by the national party executive ("Vorstand"). Initially reluctant to stand for parliament, Ellenberger was persuaded by family members to allow her name to appear on the provisional party's candidate list for the Erfurt electoral district. At the start of the meeting convened to discuss the district's candidates for the national election her name was listed in the thirteenth position, but towards the end of the discussions votes were taken, and Ellenberger ended up in second place on the Erfurt district SPD candidate list. On 18 March 1990 Irene Ellenberger was elected a member East Germany's first freely elected National Parliament (Volkskammer).

=== Thuringia politics ===
Following German reunification, in October 1990, Ellenberger was not among the approximately 40 SPD members of the last East German Volkskammer who transferred to the enlarged Bundestag of the reunited country.Reunification saw the reinstatement in the "New federal states" (former East Germany) of a regional tier of government that had been abolished in 1952. October 1990 also saw elections to the re-instated Landtag of Thuringia. Ellenberger was one of 21 SPD members elected to the regional legislature, retaining her seat at the next election in 1994. Ellenberger achieved and retained ministerial office as the regional Minister for Health and Social Affairs between 1994 and 1999. A major challenge in Thuringia was the consolidation of the region's medical, veterinary and food research offices, which incorporated consumer protection responsibilities, from three locations down to one, under a plan that envisaged significant staffing cuts, with the accompanying challenge of ensuring that funding cuts did not damage the effectiveness of the services provided. As a member of the minority party in a coalition she also had to argue her position persuasively in respect of decisions over politically sensitive questions such as hospital planning. She was proud of the labour market programme implemented on her watch which she felt benefited the employment prospects of college leavers and older workers. At the 1999 election the CDU regained their overall majority in the Landtag which put an end to coalition government in Thuringia. However, senior members of the parties that had come second and third were appointed as "Landtag vice-presidents": Irene Ellenberger held this appointment on behalf of the SPD between 1999 and 2004.

Ellenberger did not stand for re-election in 2004. Asked about this later, she explained that after fifteen years as a member of the Landtag she had become exhausted. The decision not to stand for a fourth parliamentary term was also influenced by the fact that several senior SPD parliamentary colleagues, notably Gerd Schuchardt and Frieder Lippmann, whose professional collaboration she had valued, had also decided to retire from the Assembly in 2004.
