= Derenburg =

- Stadtteil of Blankenburg am Harz
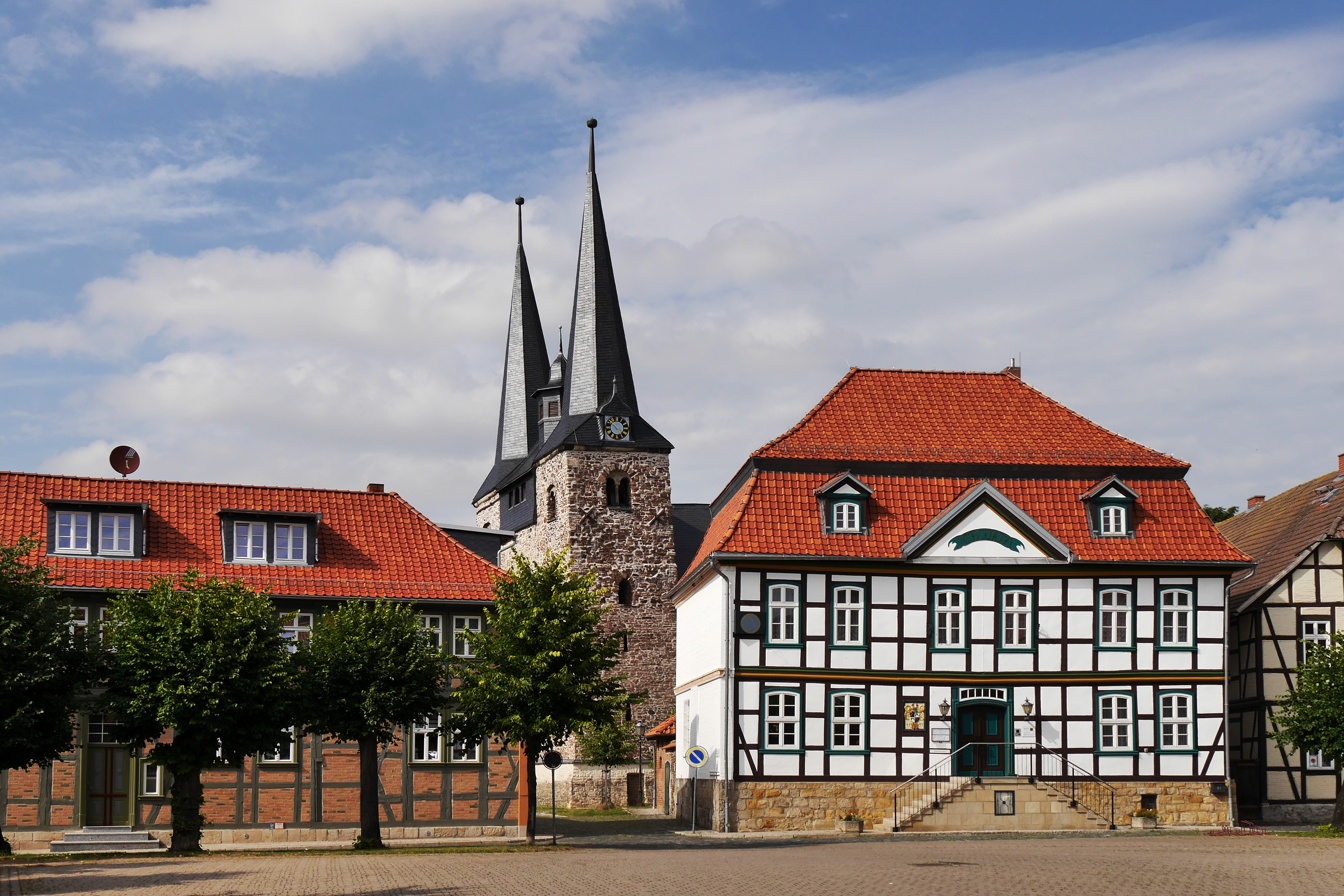
- Market square and St. Trinity Church

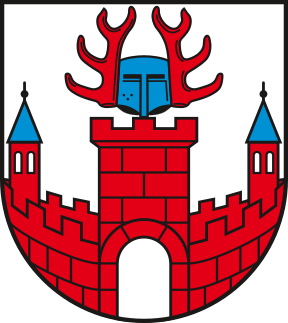
- Coat of arms
- Interactive map of Derenburg
- Location within Germany Location within Saxony-Anhalt
- Coordinates: 51°52′N 10°54′E
- Country: Germany
- State: Saxony-Anhalt
- District: Harz
- Town: Blankenburg am Harz

Area
  - Total: 37.25 km^{2} (14.38 sq mi)
- Elevation: 164 m (538 ft)

Population (2021)
  - Total: 2,466
  - Density: 66.20/km^{2} (171.5/sq mi)
- Time zone: UTC+01:00 (CET)
  - Summer (DST): UTC+02:00 (CEST)
- Postal codes: 38895
- Dialling codes: 039453
- Vehicle registration: HZ
- Website: www.derenburg.de

Derenburg is a town in the district of Harz, in Saxony-Anhalt, Germany. Since 1 January 2010, it has been part of the Blankenburg am Harz municipality. Its population is 2,466 (2021).

== Geography ==
The settlement is situated in the northern foothills of the Harz mountain range on the Holtemme river, some 9 kilometres (5.6 mi) east of Wernigerode, and 10 km (6.2 mi) west of Halberstadt. It has access to the Bundesstraße 6n highway at the nearby Heimburg junction.

== History ==
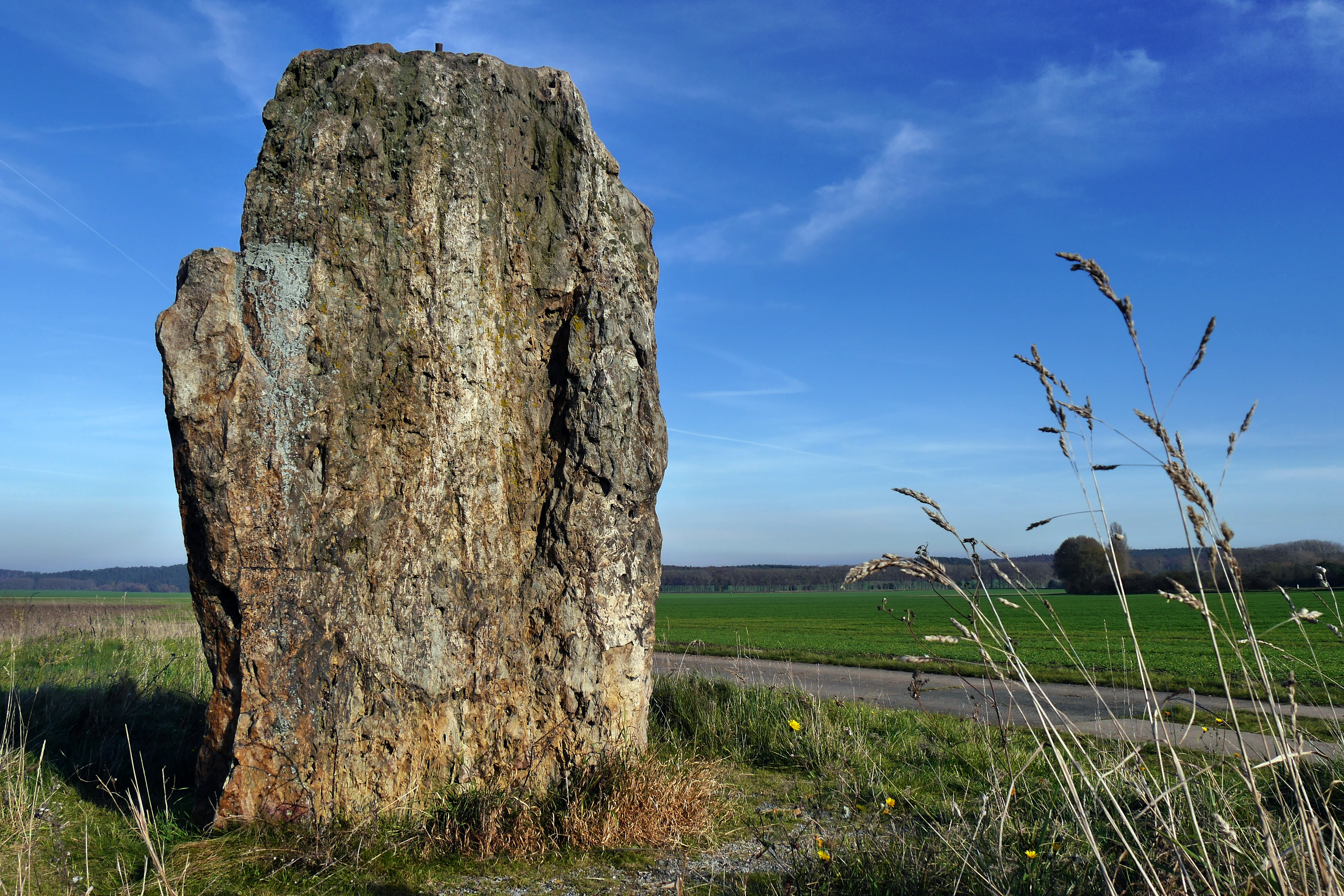
Menhir near Derenburg

Derenburg is the site of a grave field dating back to the Linear Pottery culture about 5500–4500 BC. Archaeological excavations have revealed some ornaments made from Spondylus shells fairly rare in this Northern region. Moreover, several large menhirs in the area denote a prehistoric settlement.

Derenburg was probably founded under the rule of King Henry the Fowler (d. 936 AD), who had a fortified Königspfalz erected; the first likely mention of the settlement is in a 937 deed issued by his son and successor Otto I. Then part of the Eastphalian region of medieval Saxony, it was even the site of an Imperial Diet convened by Otto's daughter Abbess Matilda of Quedlinburg in 993, while her nephew King Otto III was on campaign in Italy. Derenburg Castle remained a preferred location of the Ottonian dynasty until in 1008 King Henry II ceded the estates to Gandersheim Abbey under his aunt Abbess Sophia. Subsequently, the comital House of Regenstein was enfeoffed with the lordship and the Pfalz of Derenburg lost its Imperial status.

Derenburg witch trial of 1555, contemporary pamphlet

From the 14th century onwards, the Lordship of Derenburg was affected by the conflicts between the Regenstein counts and the Prince-Bishops of Halberstadt. The town became notorious for the Derenburg witch trials conducted in 1555; further witch-hunts continued up to the early 18th century. During the Thirty Years' War, in 1623, Derenburg was devastated by Imperial troops led by Colonel Heinrich von Schlick. With the secularised Principality of Halberstadt, the town became part of the newly established Kingdom of Prussia in 1701.

== Twin towns ==
Derenburg is twinned with Schladen (part of Schladen-Werla), Germany.
