= Holtemme =

River in Germany

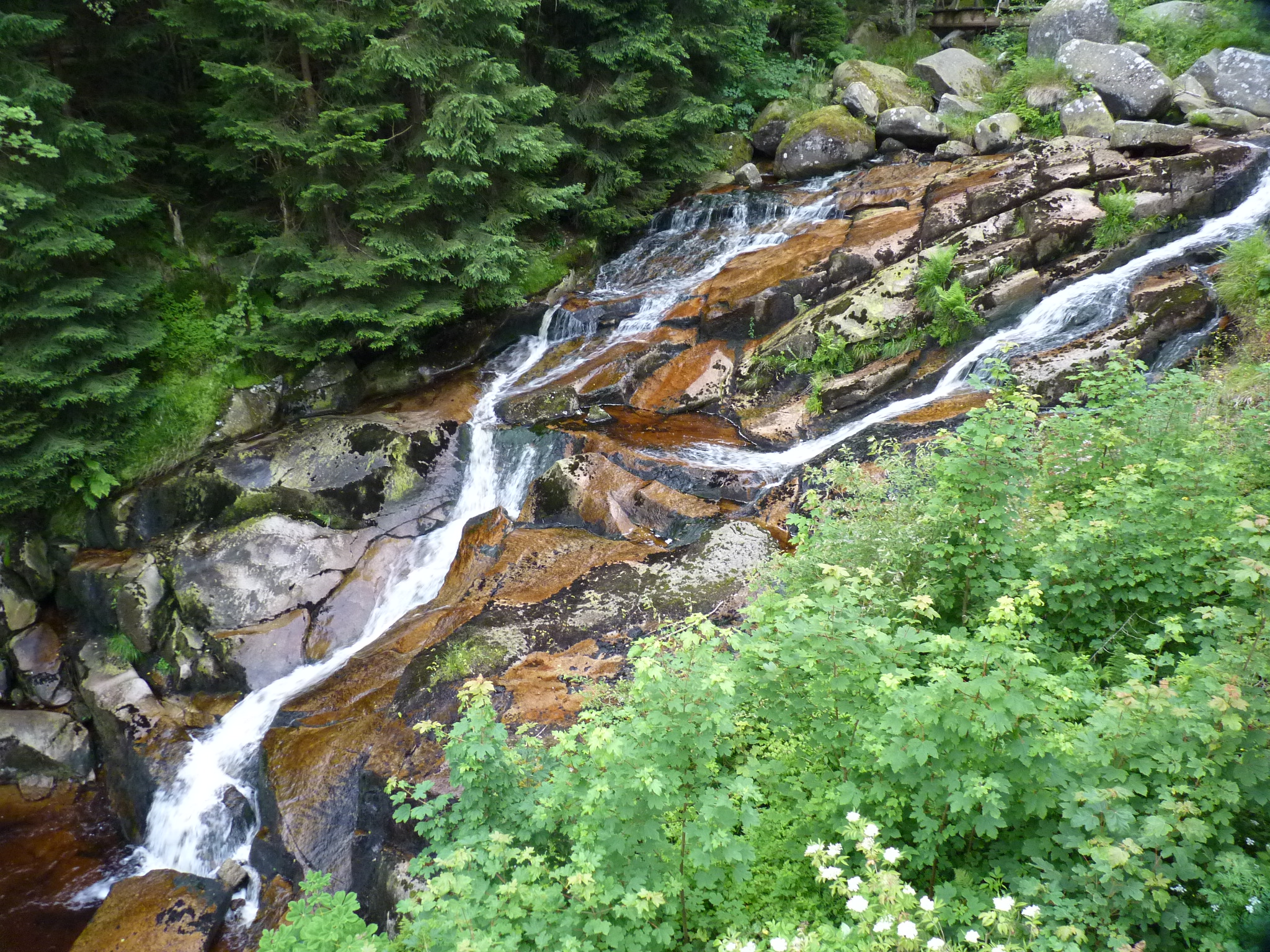
- The Steinerne Renne on the upper reaches of the Holtemme

Location
- Country: Germany
- State: Saxony-Anhalt

Physical characteristics
- Source
  - location: on the northeastern slopes of the Renneckenberg in the Harz
  - elevation: 840 m above sea level (HN)
- Mouth
  - location: near Krottorf into the Bode
  - coordinates: 51°57′49″N 11°10′59″E
  - elevation: 97 m above sea level (HN)
- Length: 47 km (29 mi)
- Basin size: 271 km^{2} (105 sq mi)

Basin features
- Progression: Bode→ Saale→ Elbe→ North Sea
- Landmarks: Large towns: Wernigerode, Halberstadt; Small towns: Derenburg

The Holtemme is a 47-kilometre (29 mi) long tributary of the river Bode in Saxony-Anhalt, Germany.

It rises in the Harz mountains at the eastern foot of the Brocken, descends during its upper course as the Steinerne Renne, a steep stream bed riddled with granite rocks, flows through Hasserode, Wernigerode and past their villages of Minsleben and Silstedt, through Derenburg and Halberstadt and discharges into the Bode near Krottorf.

In Wernigerode, not far from the western gate, the Zillierbach, which is also known as the Flutrenne, merges into the Holtemme.
