= Silstedt =

- Stadtteil of Wernigerode
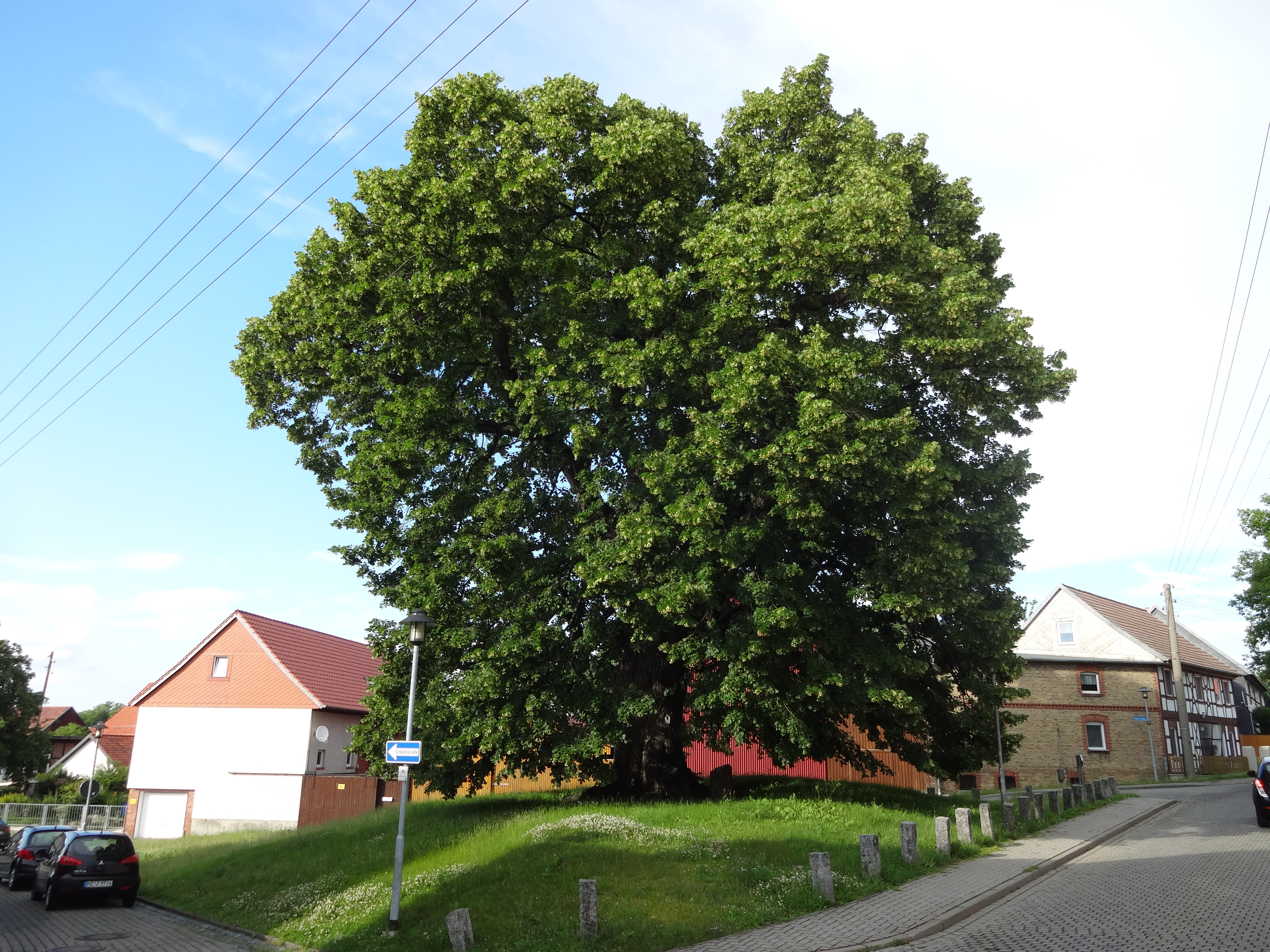
- The natural monument Krönungslinde
- Interactive map of Silstedt
- Location within Germany Location within Saxony-Anhalt
- Coordinates: 51°51′41″N 10°50′55″E
- Country: Germany
- State: Saxony-Anhalt
- District: Harz
- Town: Wernigerode
- Elevation: 191 m (627 ft)
- Time zone: UTC+01:00 (CET)
  - Summer (DST): UTC+02:00 (CEST)
- Postal codes: 38855
- Vehicle registration: HZ, WR

Silstedt is a village in Saxony-Anhalt. It is part of the town Wernigerode.

== Geography ==
Silstedt is located at the northeastern side of Wernigerode. Through Silstedt goes the Landesstraße L82, that goes from Wernigerode to Derenburg. In the Northeast flows the Holtemme.

== History ==
It got first mentioned on 12 November 995 as Silzestedi from Otto III to the Meißen diocese. On 1 April 1993, it was incorporated into Wernigerode.

== Demographics ==
Historical population

Year	Pop.	±% p.a.
1579	344	—
1725	486	+0.24%
1741	511	+0.31%
1750	490	−0.47%
1773	514	+0.21%
1808	662	+0.73%
1826	680	+0.15%
1840	774	+0.93%
1857	830	+0.41%

Year	Pop.	±% p.a.
1882	980	+0.67%
1901	1,010	+0.16%
1911	1,056	+0.45%
1933	1,096	+0.17%
1939	1,124	+0.42%
1957	1,463	+1.48%
2008	1,100	−0.56%
2010	1,000	−4.65%
