= Reddeber =

- Stadtteil of Wernigerode
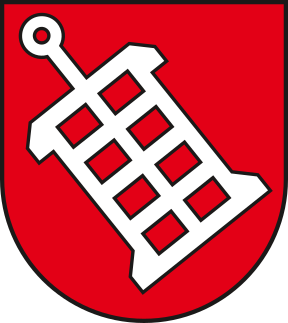
- Coat of arms
- Interactive map of Reddeber
- Location within Germany Location within Saxony-Anhalt
- Coordinates: 51°52′N 10°48′E
- Country: Germany
- State: Saxony-Anhalt
- District: Harz
- Town: Wernigerode

Area
  - Total: 4.76 km^{2} (1.84 sq mi)
- Elevation: 201 m (659 ft)

Population (2006-12-31)
  - Total: 880
  - Density: 180/km^{2} (480/sq mi)
- Time zone: UTC+01:00 (CET)
  - Summer (DST): UTC+02:00 (CEST)
- Postal codes: 38855
- Dialling codes: 03943
- Vehicle registration: HZ

Reddeber is a village and a former municipality in the district of Harz, in Saxony-Anhalt, Germany.

Since 1 January 2011, it is part of the town Wernigerode.
