= Zillierbach =

River in Germany

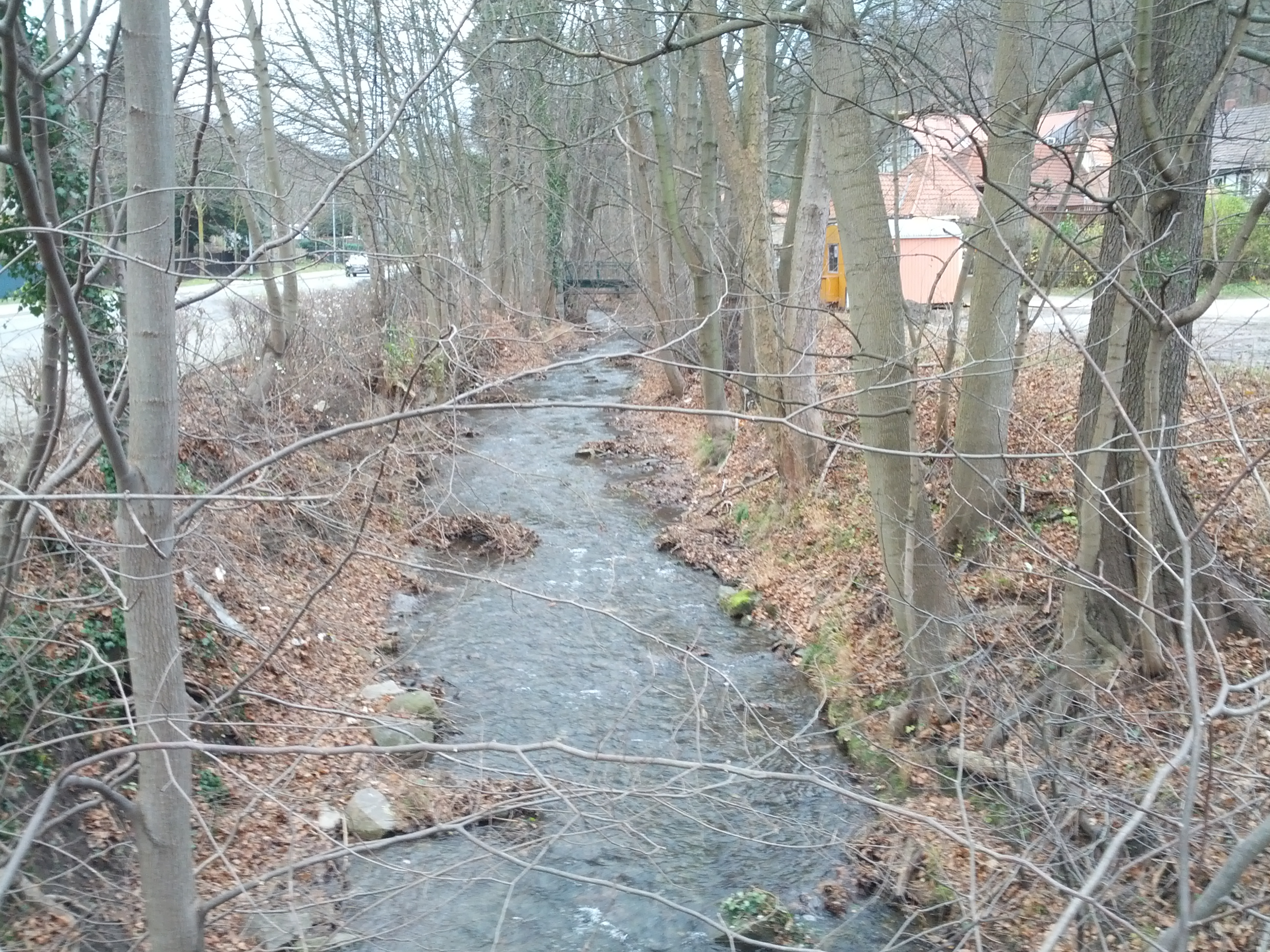

Location
- Country: Germany
- State: Saxony-Anhalt

Physical characteristics
- Source
  - location: Southeast side of the Hohneklippen
- Mouth
  - location: in Wernigerode into the Holtemme
  - coordinates: 51°50′04″N 10°46′44″E
- Length: 13 km (8 mi)

Basin features
- Progression: Holtemme→ Bode→ Saale→ Elbe→ North Sea

The Zillierbach (until 1558 called the Zilgerbach) is a stream in the Harz mountains of central Germany (Harz district) in the state of Saxony-Anhalt. It is about 13 kilometres (8 mi) long. The stream rises on the western side of the Hohneklippen crags and runs initially southwards, then swings northeast at Drei Annen Hohne. South of Drei Annen Hohne it picks up the waters of the Wormsgraben, its main tributary. The Zillierbach supplies the Zillierbach Dam near Elbingerode. In front of the settlement of Voigtstieg it is joined by another two smaller brooks. In the Middle Ages the Zillierbach powered the mills between Voigtstieg and Wernigerode. This section of the valley is still called Mühlental (Mill Valley) today. In its lower reaches before its mouth the stream is known as the Flutrenne. The stream discharges into the Holtemme at Wernigerode northwest of the West Gate (Westerntor). It descends almost 400 metres (1,300 ft) from source to mouth during its 13 km journey.

== Habitat and ecology ==
The Zillierbach is home to a range of rare fish species, including the protected brown trout, which features on the coat-of-arms of the town of Wernigerode as well as that of the district of Harz. Besides trout, the stream also supports the minnow, the gudgeon and the loach. To improve the ecological environment of the Zillierbach a project was carried out from 2000 to 2002 by the German Foundation for the Environment, which envisaged five weirs with fish ladders in order to provide enable trout to negotiate the river more easily. The project was a significant factor in the town of Wernigerode being recognised for outstanding work in nature conservation as part of the competition to select the nation's "Conservation Capital" (Bundeshauptstadt Naturschutz).

== See also ==
- Holtemme
- Zillierbach Dam
- List of rivers of Saxony-Anhalt
