= Wernigerode =

Town in Saxony-Anhalt, Germany

- Town
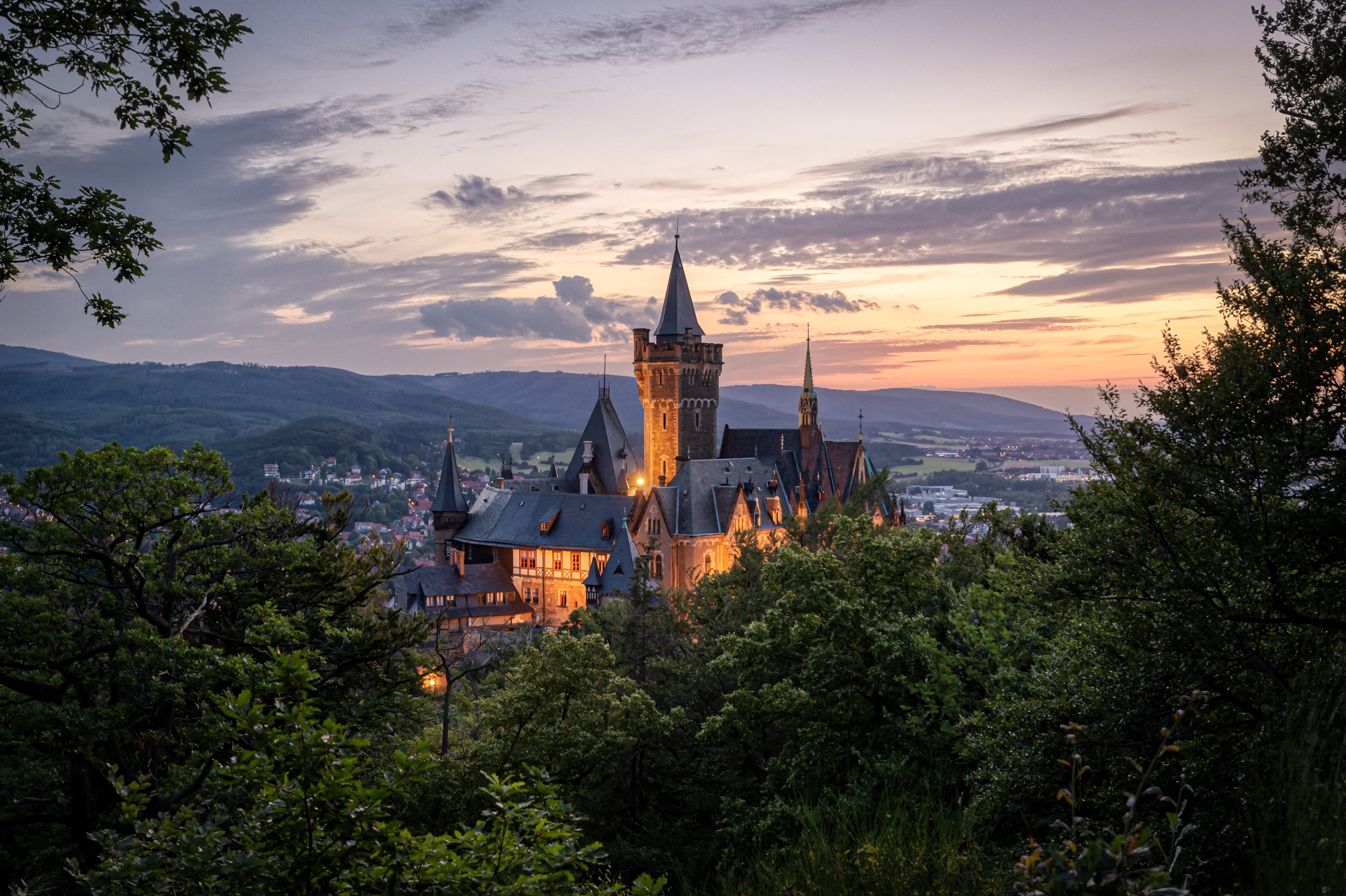
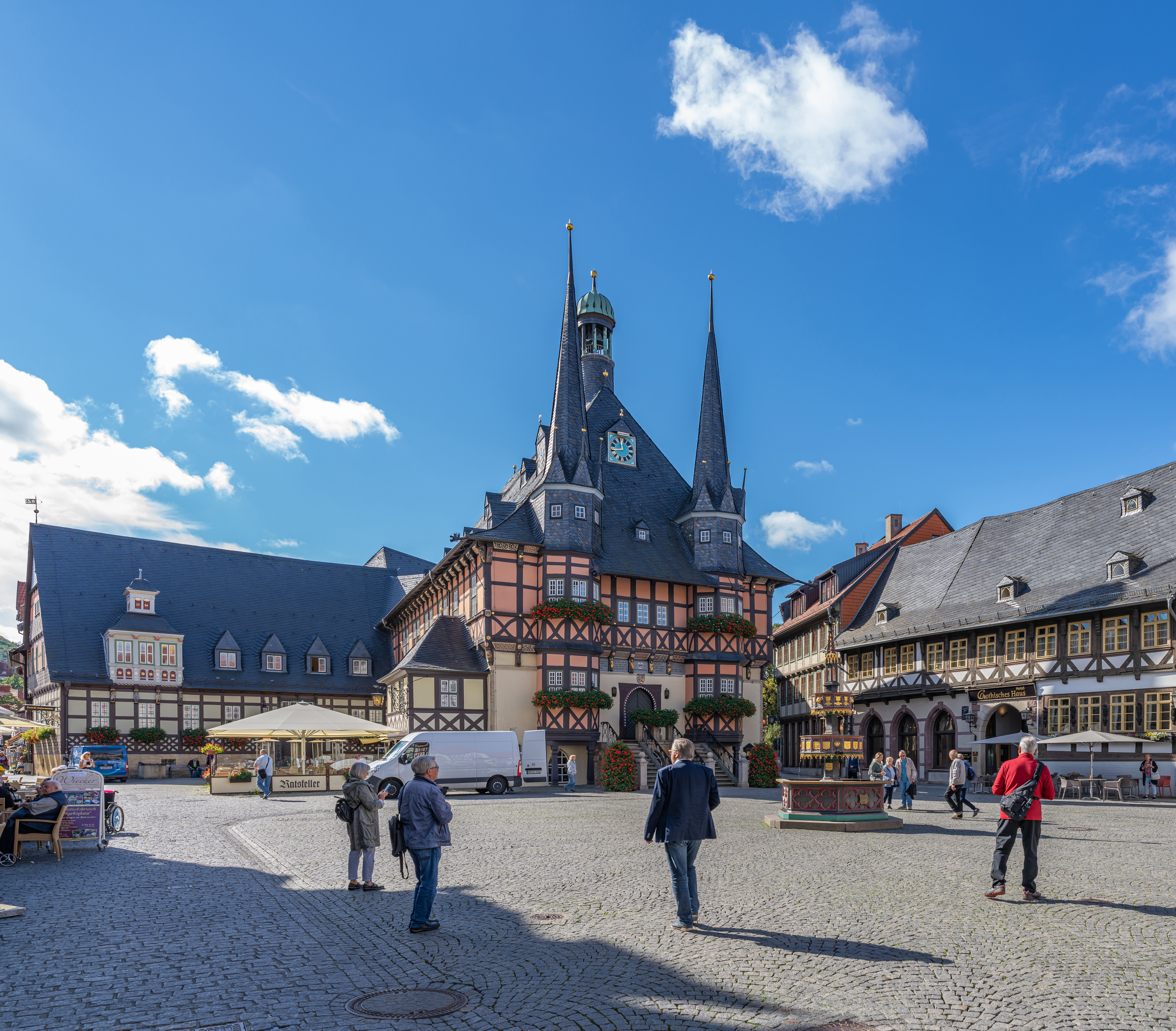
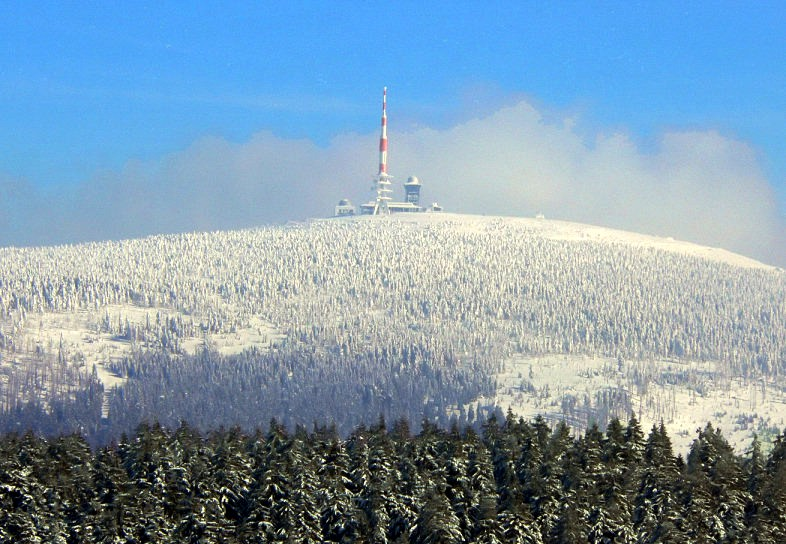
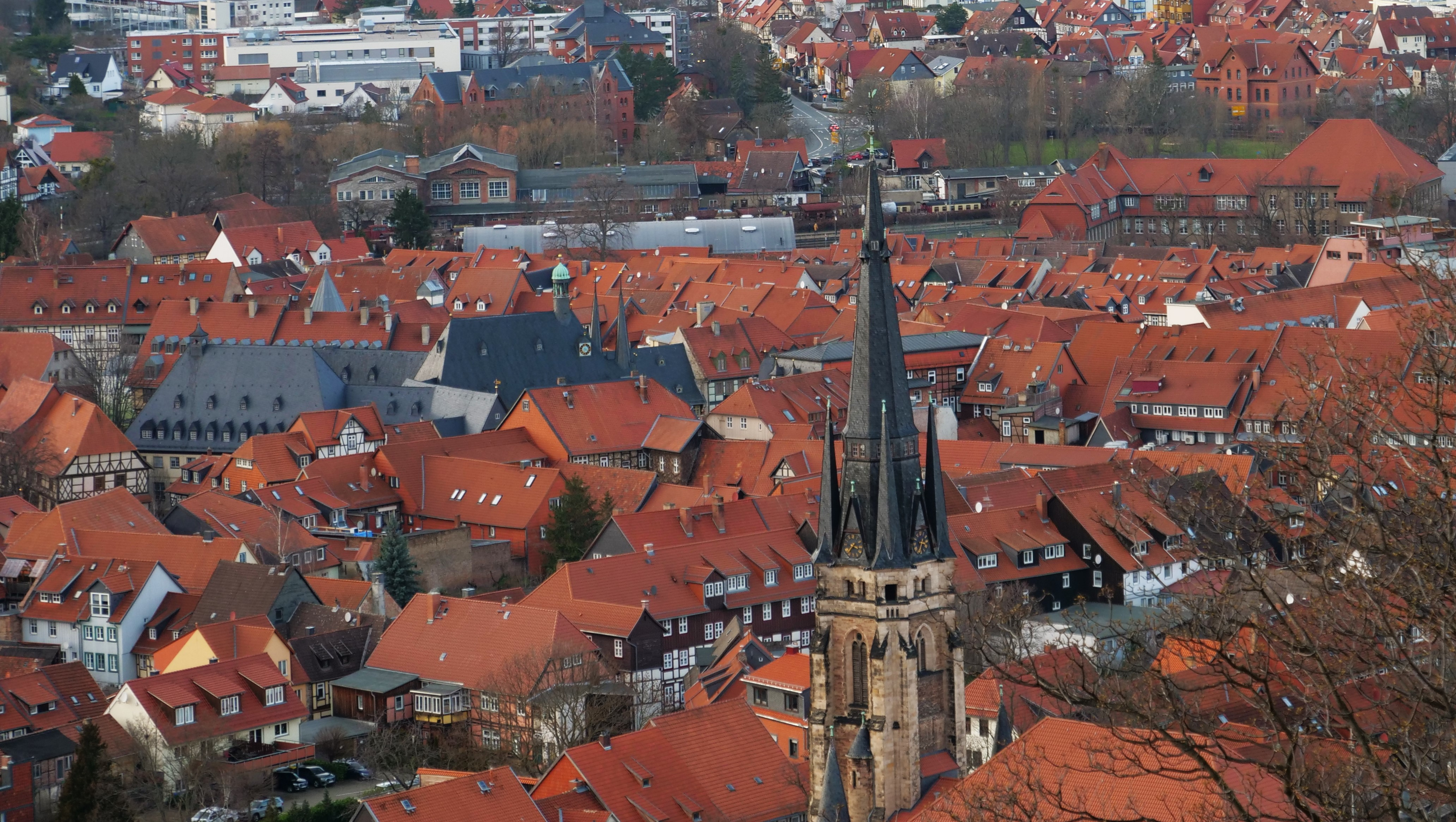
- Wernigerode Castle Townhall Brocken Old town

- Coat of arms

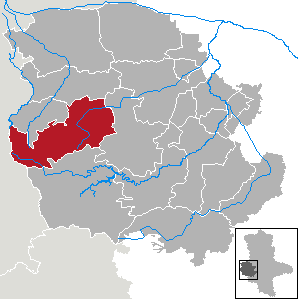
- Location of Wernigerode within Harz district
- Interactive map of Wernigerode
- Location within Germany Location within Saxony-Anhalt
- Coordinates: 51°50′6″N 10°47′7″E
- Country: Germany
- State: Saxony-Anhalt
- District: Harz

Government
  - Mayor (2022–29): Tobias Kascha (SPD)

Area
  - Total: 170.03 km^{2} (65.65 sq mi)
- Elevation: 240 m (790 ft)

Population (2025-12-31)
  - Total: 31,835
  - Density: 187.23/km^{2} (484.93/sq mi)
- Time zone: UTC+01:00 (CET)
  - Summer (DST): UTC+02:00 (CEST)
- Postal codes: 38855, 38879
- Dialling codes: 03943, 039455
- Vehicle registration: HZ, HBS, QLB, WR
- Website: www.wernigerode.de

Wernigerode (German pronunciation: [ˌvɛɐnɪɡəˈʁoːdə]) is a town in the Harz district of the German state of Saxony-Anhalt. Until 2007, it was the capital of the District of Wernigerode. Its population was 32,181 in 2020.

Wernigerode is located southwest of Halberstadt, and is picturesquely situated on the Holtemme river, on the northern slopes of the Harz Mountains. Wernigerode is located on the German Timber-Frame Road.

== Geography ==
=== Location ===
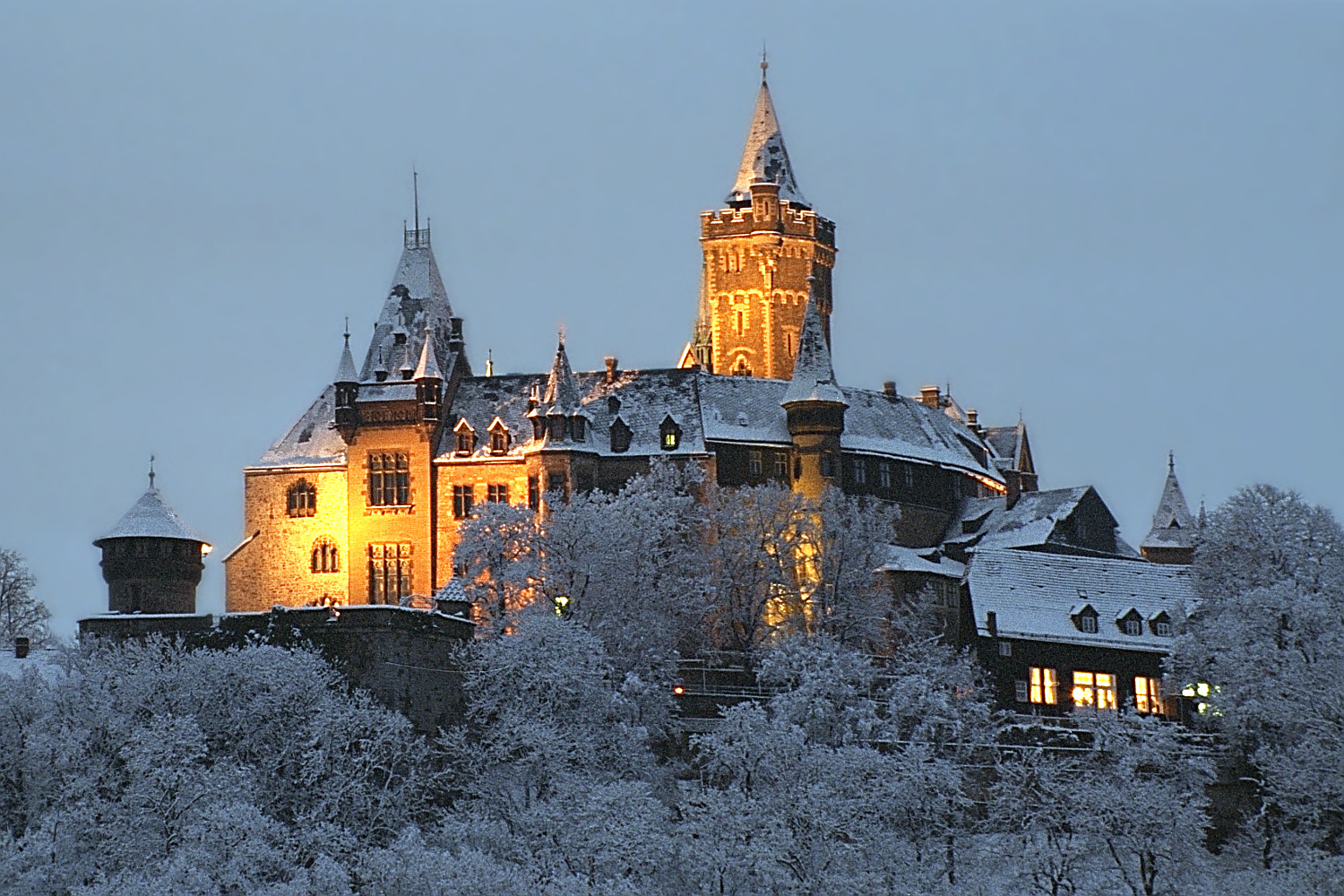
Wernigerode Castle

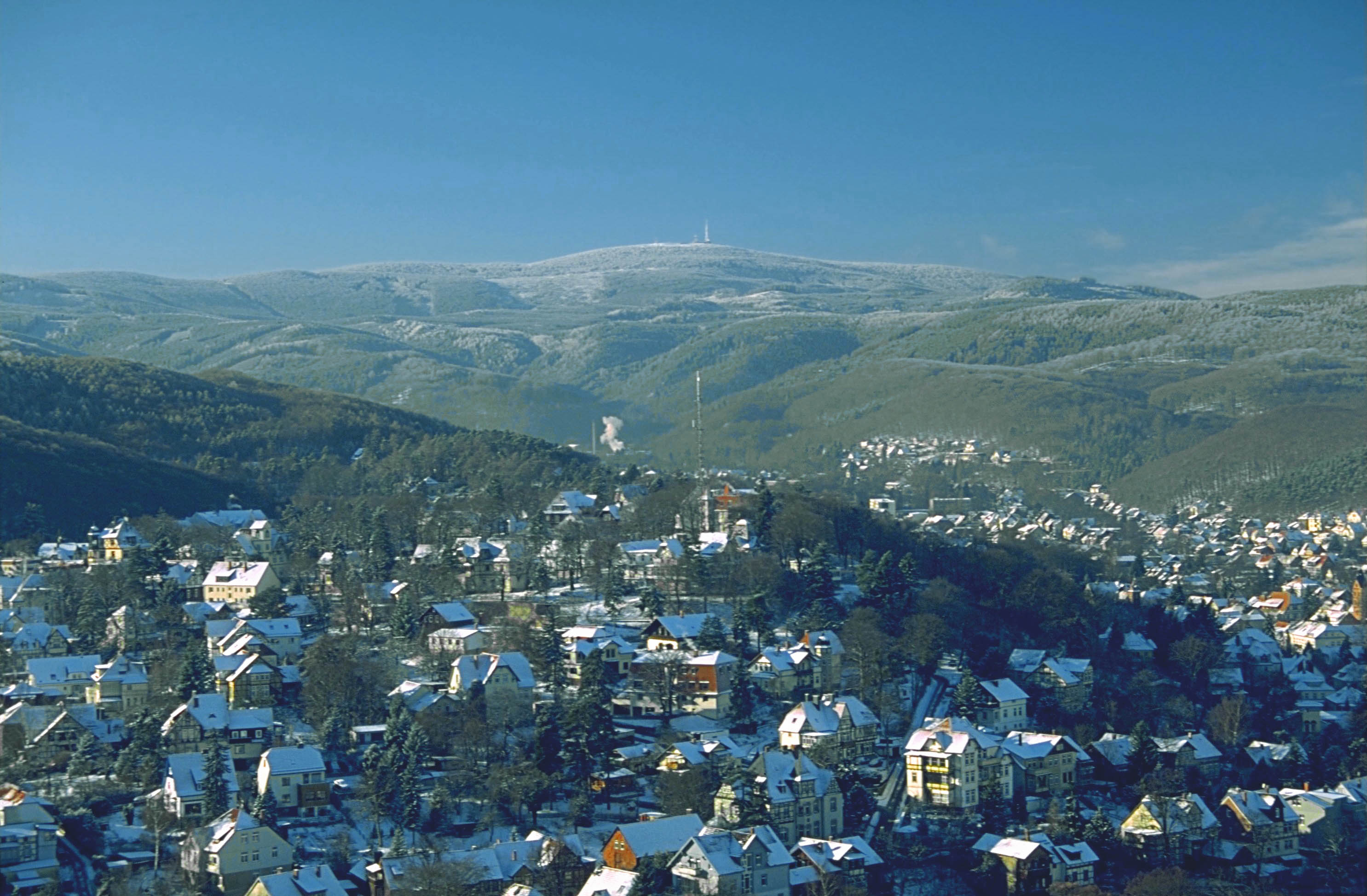
Wernigerode and the Brocken in winter

The town lies at about 250 metres (820 ft) above sea level (NN) on the northeastern flank of the Harz Mountains in central Germany, at the foot of their highest peak, the Brocken, on the B 6 and B 244 federal highways and on the railway line from Halberstadt to Vienenburg that links the cities of Halle (Saale) and Hanover.

The River Holtemme flows through the town and, not far from its western gate, it is joined by the Zillierbach stream, which is also known as the Flutrenne near its mouth. North of the town the Barrenbach flows through several ponds and empties into the Holtemme in the village of Minsleben. The historic town centre consists of an old town and a new town (Altstadt and Neustadt). The town's borough includes Hasserode, Nöschenrode, the residential estates of Stadtfeld, Burgbreite and Harzblick as well as the villages of Benzingerode, Minsleben, Silstedt, Schierke and Reddeber.

The borough measures 9.5 kilometres (5.9 mi) from west to east and 6 kilometres (3.7 mi) from north to south. Its highest point is the Brocken, at 1,141 metres (3,743 ft) above NN, and its lowest is at 215 metres (705 ft).

The town lies on the German-Dutch holiday road known as the Orange Route.

The Northern Harz Boundary Fault crosses the borough along which runs the watershed between the Weser and Elbe rivers. To the north precipitation flows into the Weser, to the southeast, later northeast, waters flow into the Elbe. This fault line runs through the suburb of Hasserode to the west south west of the city centre and forms the town's castle hill to the south east of the city centre.

=== Town divisions ===
The town of Wernigerode is divided into the town itself, including the villages of Hasserode and Nöschenrode incorporated before 1994, and five villages with their own local councils that were integrated after 1994: Benzingerode, Minsleben, Reddeber, Schierke and Silstedt.

=== Climate ===
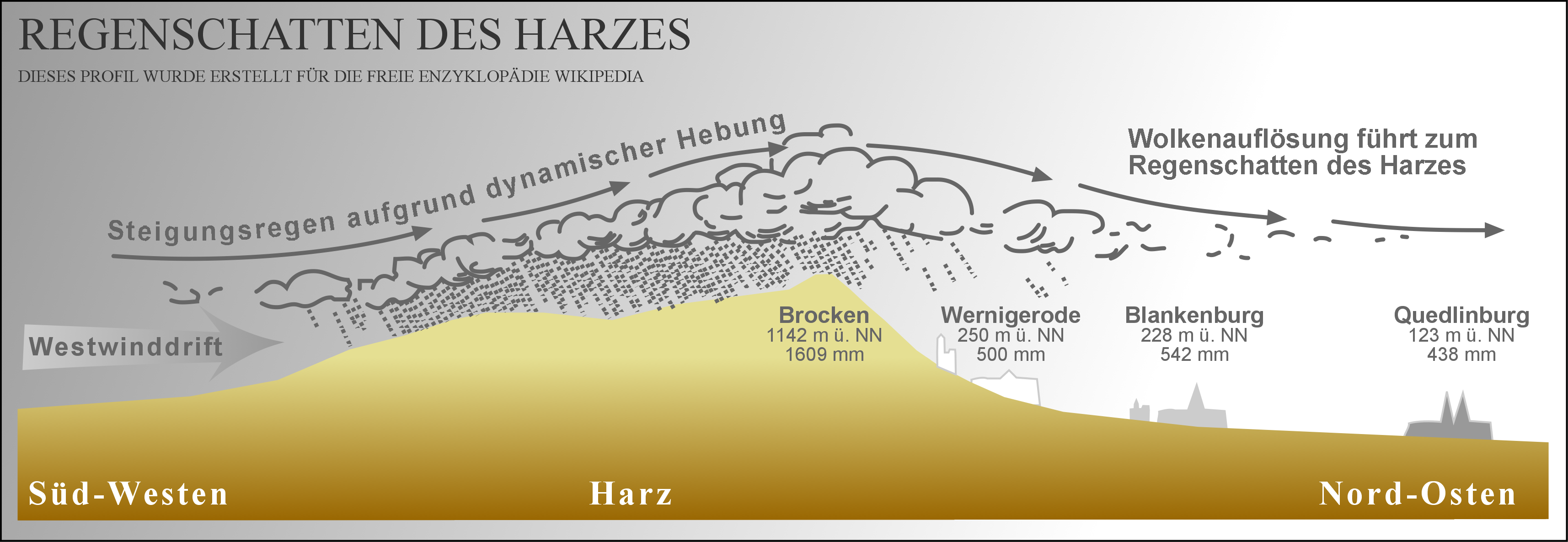
Wernigerode in the rain shadow of the Harz

Wernigerode is located in the Central European transition subzone of the temperate climatic zone. Its average annual temperature is 9.5 °C (49.1 °F); its average annual precipitation is 500 millimetres (20 in).

The warmest months are June to August with average temperatures of 16.0 to 18.3 °C (60.8 to 64.9 °F) and the coldest are December to February at 1.1 to 2.1 °C (34.0 to 35.8 °F).

The most rain falls in July, on average 54 millimetres (2.1 in), the least in February, with 30 millimetres (1.2 in) on average.

The climate, more precisely the amounts of precipitation and temperatures, are influenced by the orographic rainfall caused by the Harz Mountains. Because the town lies in the rain shadow (leeward side) of the Harz, less precipitation falls here than in similar temperate regions without the protection of a mountain range. In addition the occasional föhn winds that occur result in an increase in temperatures.

Climate data for Wernigerode (1991–2020 normals)
Month	Jan	Feb	Mar	Apr	May	Jun	Jul	Aug	Sep	Oct	Nov	Dec	Year
Mean daily maximum °C (°F)	4.5 (40.1)	4.8 (40.6)	8.9 (48.0)	14.2 (57.6)	18.2 (64.8)	21.6 (70.9)	24.2 (75.6)	23.9 (75.0)	19.2 (66.6)	14.1 (57.4)	8.6 (47.5)	5.3 (41.5)	14.2 (57.6)
Daily mean °C (°F)	1.7 (35.1)	1.6 (34.9)	4.8 (40.6)	9.1 (48.4)	13.2 (55.8)	16.5 (61.7)	19.0 (66.2)	18.2 (64.8)	14.5 (58.1)	10.2 (50.4)	5.8 (42.4)	2.7 (36.9)	9.9 (49.8)
Mean daily minimum °C (°F)	−1.2 (29.8)	−2.0 (28.4)	0.6 (33.1)	3.6 (38.5)	7.5 (45.5)	11.0 (51.8)	13.2 (55.8)	13.0 (55.4)	9.4 (48.9)	6.1 (43.0)	2.4 (36.3)	−0.5 (31.1)	5.4 (41.7)
Average precipitation mm (inches)	52.3 (2.06)	35.9 (1.41)	43.5 (1.71)	32.0 (1.26)	64.2 (2.53)	47.0 (1.85)	67.1 (2.64)	54.8 (2.16)	55.1 (2.17)	41.3 (1.63)	44.0 (1.73)	46.9 (1.85)	613.9 (24.17)
Average precipitation days (≥ 1.0 mm)	17.7	14.0	15.0	11.6	14.3	13.4	15.5	14.0	13.3	13.9	15.2	17.5	176.3
Average relative humidity (%)	80	77.3	73.9	67.2	68.6	68.2	66.0	67.2	73.1	78.7	82.1	80.5	73.6
Mean monthly sunshine hours	62.6	87.4	139.0	182.0	205.0	215.3	223.9	203.4	151.4	122.9	67.7	51.3	1,743.7
Source: World Meteorological Organization

Wernigerode has a snow load class of 3 according to the German industrial standard, DIN 1055.

== History ==
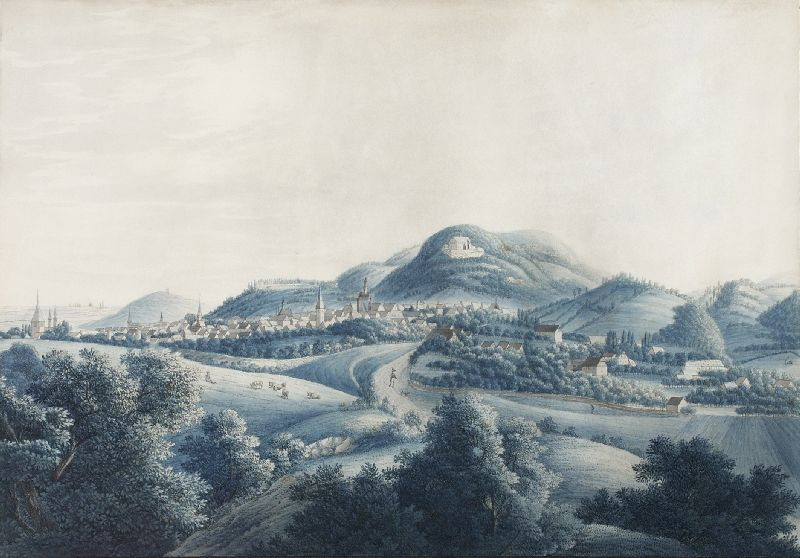
Friedrich August Schmidt: Stadt Wernigerode vom Eisenberg, c. 1820 – Wernigerode around 1820,

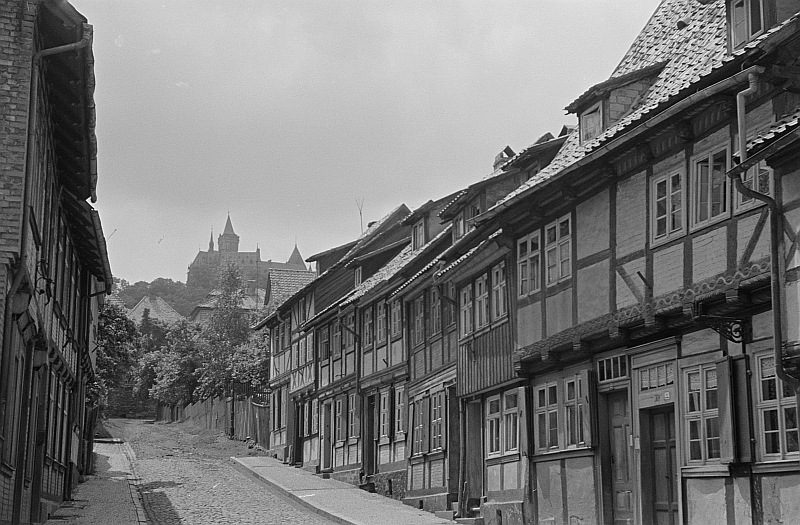
Wernigerode in 1951

Wernigerode was the capital of the medieval County of Wernigerode and Stolberg-Wernigerode. In 1815, after the Napoleonic Wars, it became part of the Prussian Province of Saxony. The Hasseröder brewery was founded in Wernigerode in 1872.

After World War II, Wernigerode was included in the new state Saxony-Anhalt within the Soviet occupation zone (relaunched in October 1949 as the German Democratic Republic/East Germany). During the Communist years, the town was very close to the inner German border. Wernigerode became part of the restored state of Saxony-Anhalt in 1990 after German reunification.

=== Emergence of the town ===
There are no written sources confirming exactly when the town was established. According to the latest research – for example, by Eduard Jacobs and Walther Grosse – there were no early relations with the Abbey at Corvey (Weser) and the abbot there, Warin, instead the town name suggests it was a protected clearance settlement.

The first area to be settle was the Klint, where there was a lowland castle, the so-called Schnakenburg. In 1805 the ruins of this castle site were demolished. The only part remaining is Haus Gadenstedt at Oberpfarrkirchhof 12 which dates to the year 1582. At the time of the first settlelement there was still ancient forest, typical of the Harz, on the heights of the Klint, which had first to be cleared, hence the suffix rode in the town name which means 'clearing'.

The town was first mentioned in the records in 1121 in connection with Count Adalbert of Haimar who had moved here from the region near Hildesheim and henceforth was titled the Count of Wernigerode. On 17 April 1229 the settlement was granted town rights along the lines of that for Goslar. In 2004 Wernigerode celebrated the 775th anniversary of that occasion.

As a result of the immigration of new townsfolk from the surrounding villages a new settlement, later called Neustadt, grew up on the northeastern edge of the old town. It was a farming settlement that lay outside the walls of the old town. St. John's Church was built as the parish church of Wernigerode's Neustadt in the last third of the 13th century in the Romanesque style.

=== Early rulers ===
The counts of Wernigerode, who can be traced back to the early 12th century, were successively vassals of the margraves of Brandenburg (1268), and the archbishops of Magdeburg (1381). On the extinction of the family in 1429 the county fell to the counts of Stolberg, who founded the Stolberg-Wernigerode branch in 1645. The latter surrendered its military and fiscal independence to Prussia in 1714, but retained some of its sovereign rights till 1876. The counts were raised to princely rank in 1890.

=== Mayors ===
- Runden, c. 1640
- Ludwig Gepel, 7 January 1921 to 6 January 1933
- Ulrich von Fresenius (1 September 1888; died 12 November 1962), 10 January 1933 to 20 April 1945
- Max Otto (1889–1969), SPD/SED, 20 April 1945 to 1951
- Gustav Strahl, 1951 to 1962
- Martin Kilian, SED, 24 October 1962 to 1990
- Herbert Teubner, CDU, 1990 to 1991
- Horst-Dieter Weyrauch, CDU, 1991 to 1994
- Ludwig Hoffmann, SPD, 1994 to 31 July 2008
- Peter Gaffert, independent, since 1 August 2008
- Tobias Kascha, SPD, since 1 August 2022

=== Population statistics ===
- 1595: 2,500
- 1806: 3,700
- 1845: 5,000
- 1869: 7,000
- 1886: 9,000
- 1895: 10,662
- 1904: 12,000
- 1914: 18,000
- 1957: 33,353
- 1990: 37,000
- 2006: 33,871
- 2007: 34,413
- 2008: 35,041
- 2009: 34,673

== Architecture ==
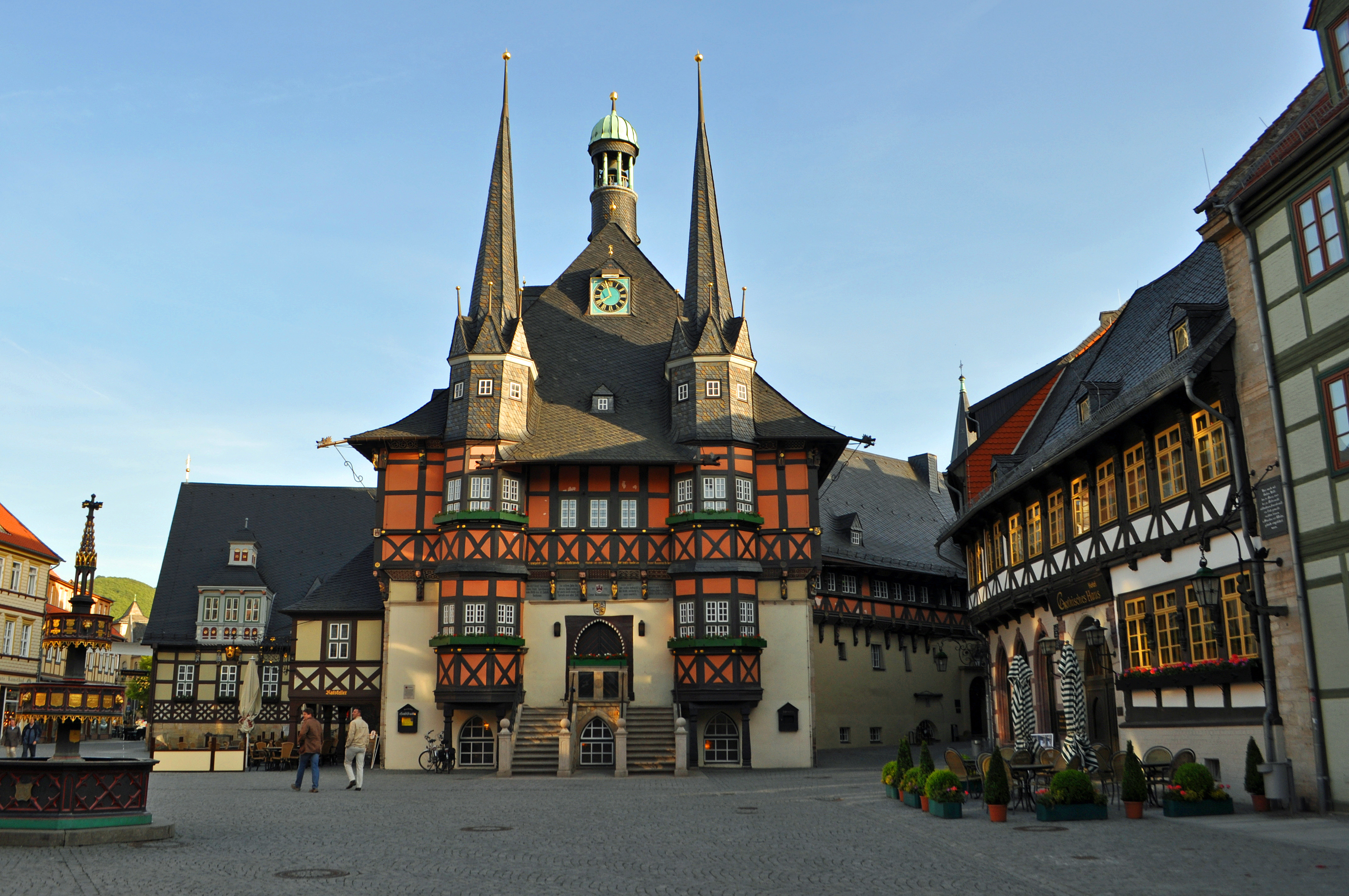
Town hall and marketplace

Wernigerode contains several interesting Gothic buildings, including a fine town hall with a timber facade from 1498. Some of the quaint old houses which have escaped the numerous fires through the years are elaborately adorned with wood-carving. The Gerhart-Hauptmann Gymnasium, occupying a modern Gothic building, is the successor to an ancient grammar school that existed until 1825. The castle (Schloß Wernigerode) of the princes of Stolberg-Wernigerode rises above the town. The original was built in the 12th century but the present castle was built between 1862 and 1893 by Karl Frühling and includes parts of the medieval building.

== Economy ==
Brandy, Hasseröder lager, cigars and dyes are among the products manufactured in Wernigerode.

== Education ==
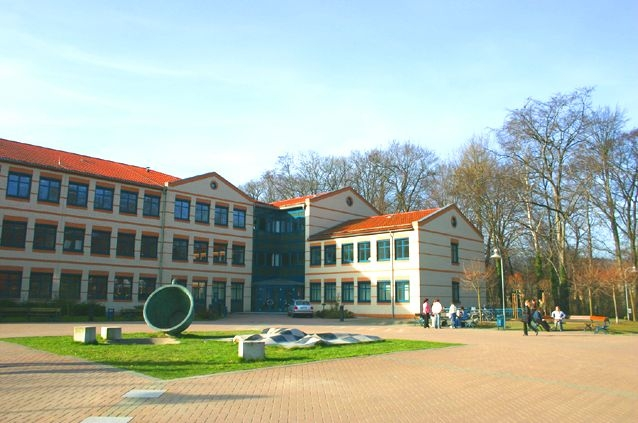
The campus in Wernigerode

Wernigerode is a site of the Harz University of Applied Studies.

== Sights ==
- Harzer Schmalspurbahn – a narrow gauge railway that leads from Wernigerode to the Brocken (1,141 m or 3,743 ft), the highest peak in the Harz Mountains, and then goes to Nordhausen to the south of the Harz mountains. The second highest peak, Wurmberg (971 m or 3,186 ft), is accessible by cable car from Braunlage which is connected by bus to Wernigerode. Wernigerode has numerous museums, galleries, libraries, monuments and parks.
- Armeleuteberg – hill with an Emperor Tower and forest inn.
- Little Harz is a Miniature park which is located in the landscape park called Bürgerpark.
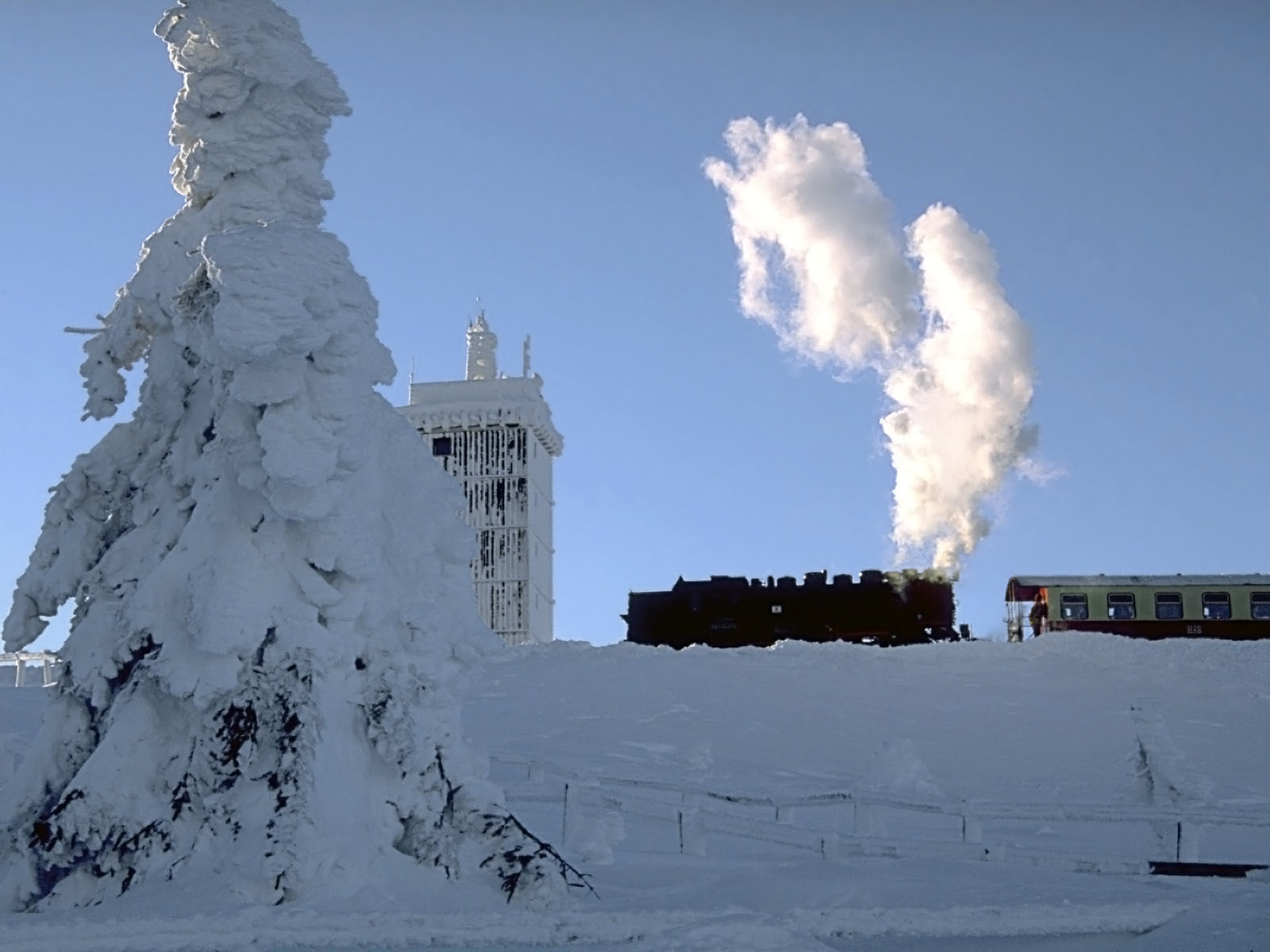
Top of the Brocken with the Brockenbahn, which starts in Wernigerode

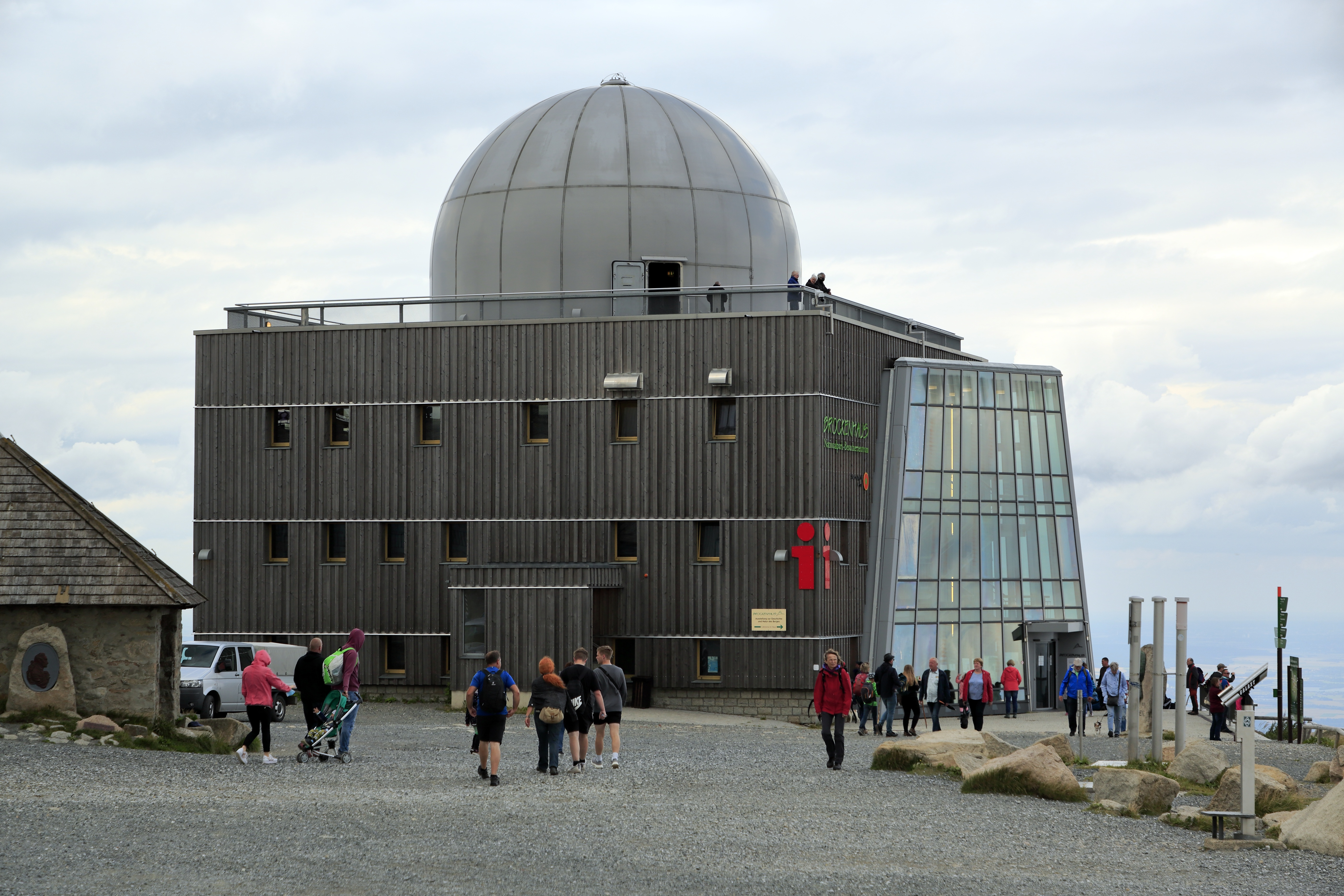
Brocken House which houses a museum and a visitor centre

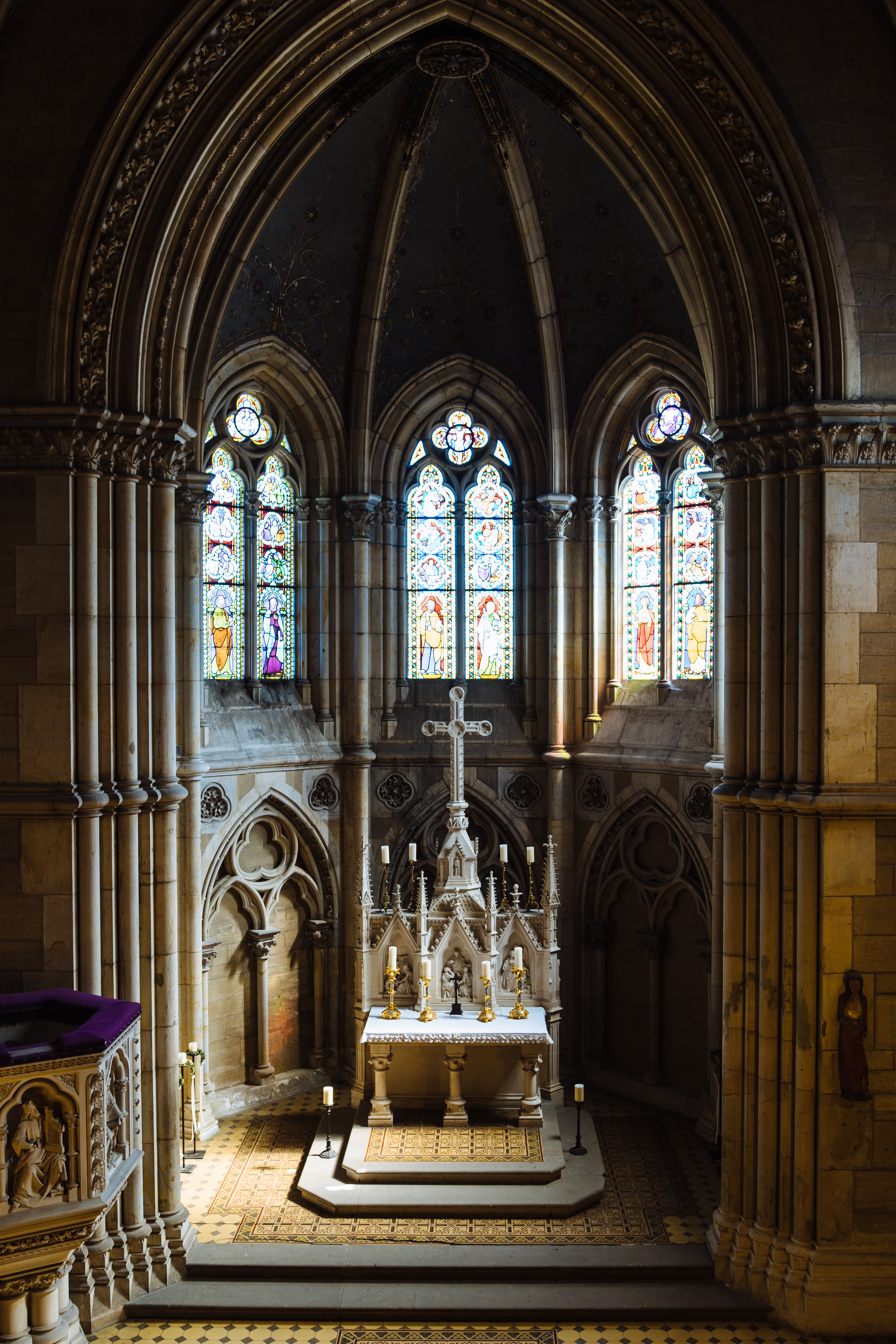
Chape lSt. Pantaleon and Anna of Wernigerode Castle

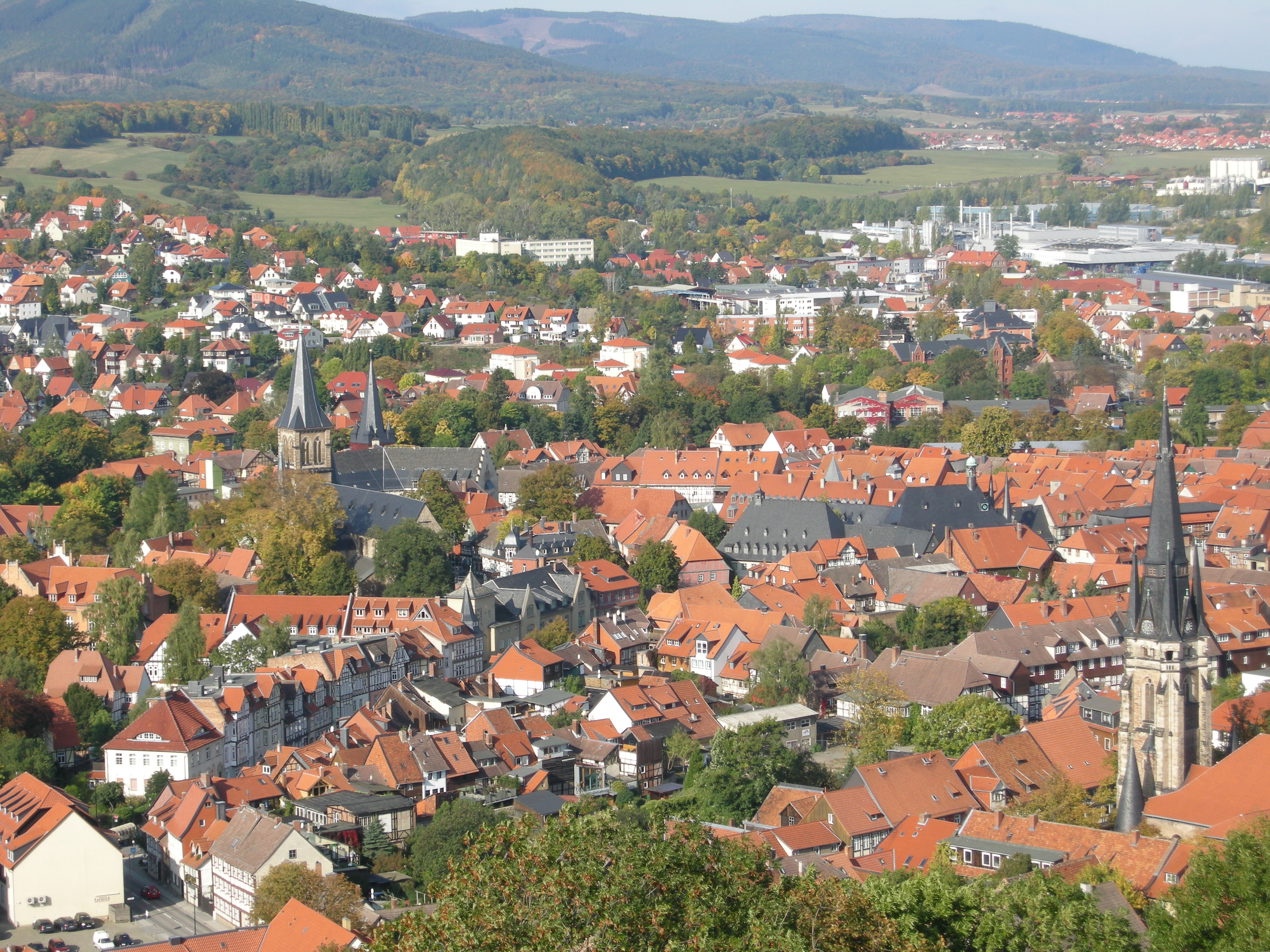
View over the old town of Wernigerode

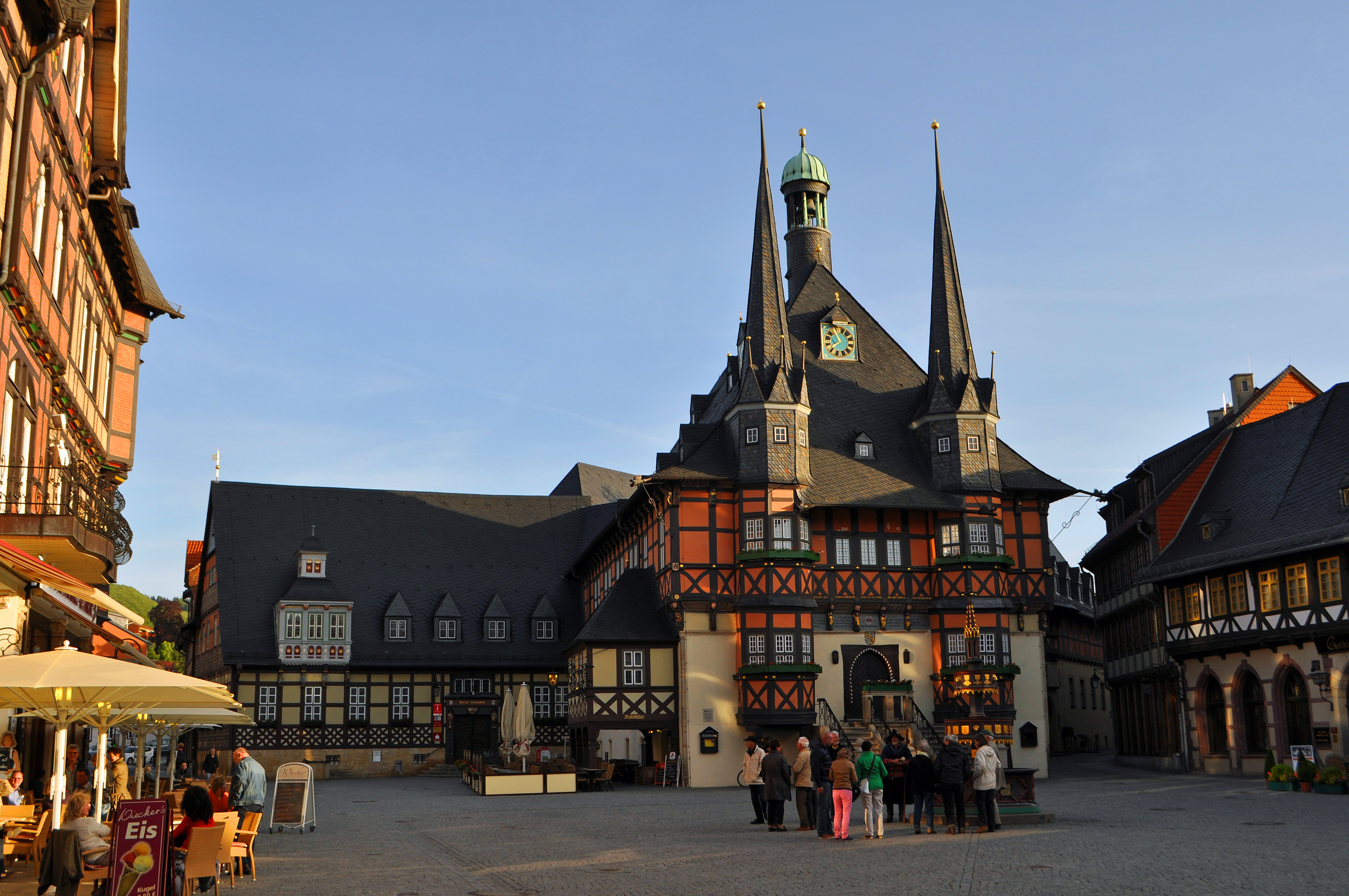
Town hall

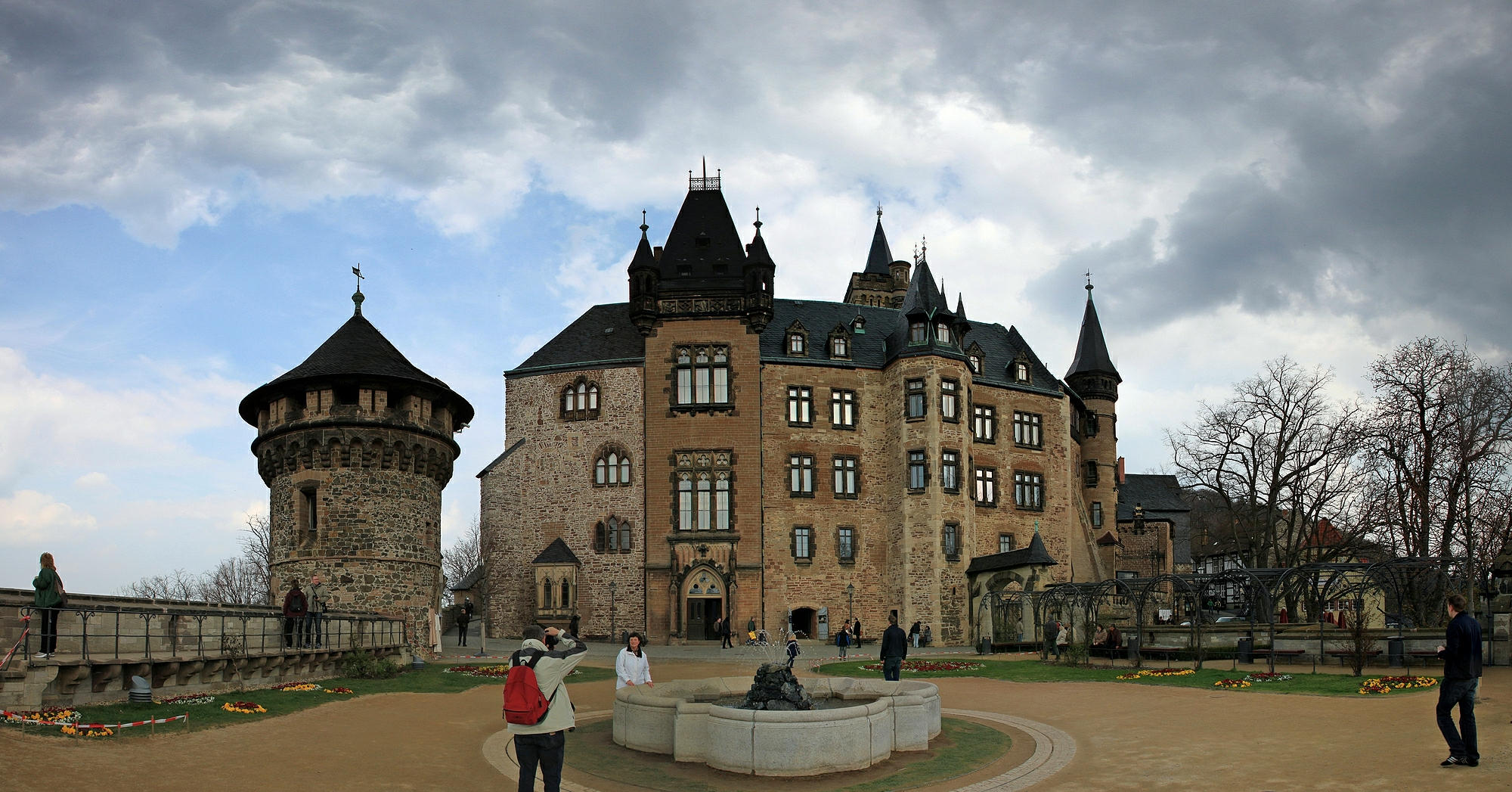
Wernigerode Castle

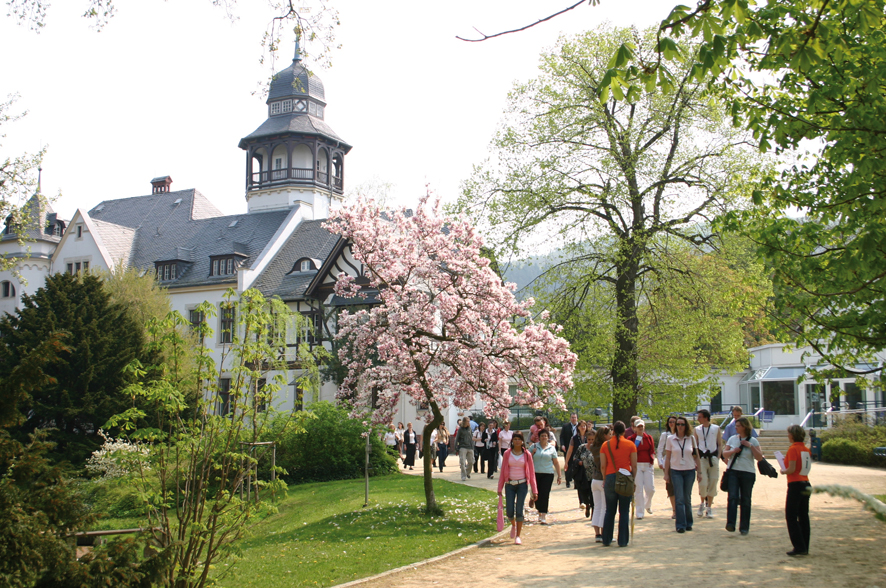
Wernigerode campus is part of the Hochschule Harz

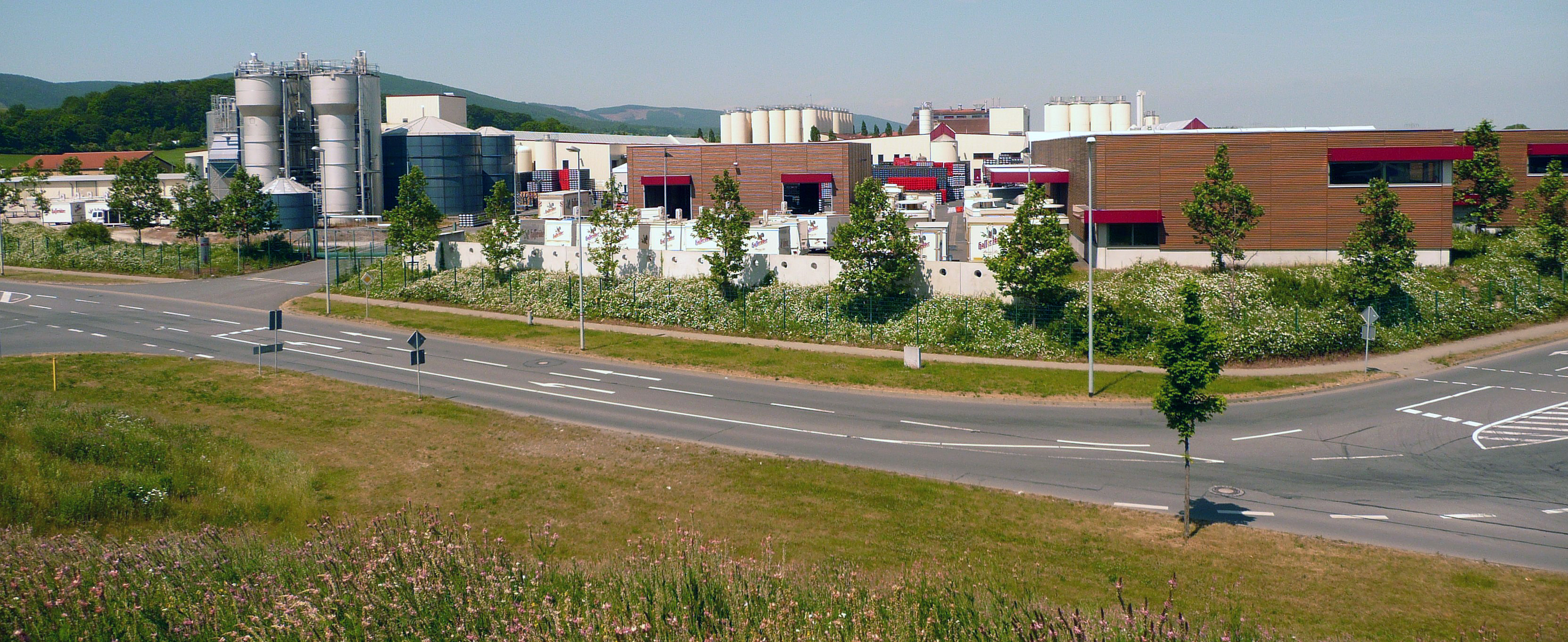
The Hasseröder brewery in Wernigerode

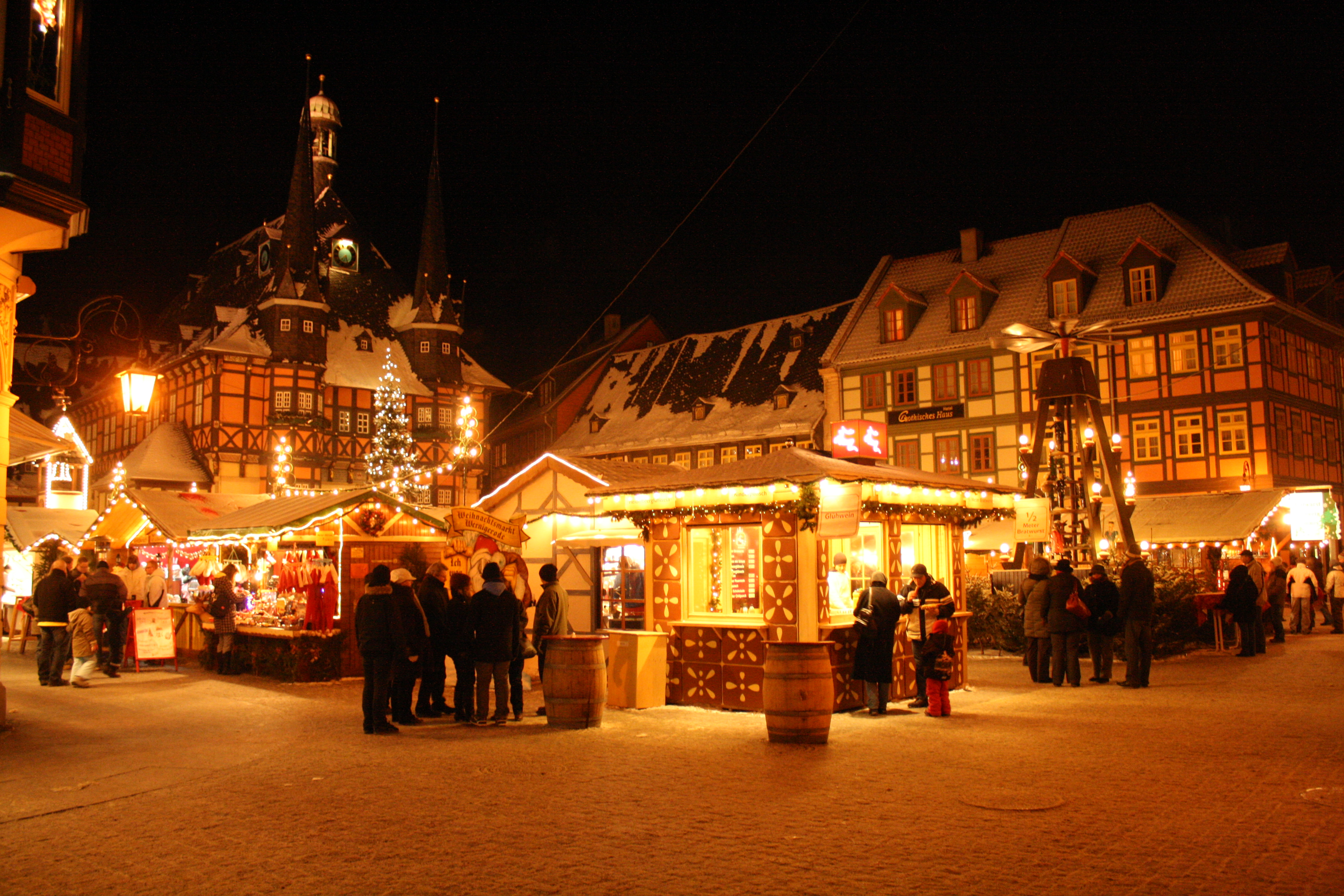
Town hall and Christmas market at night

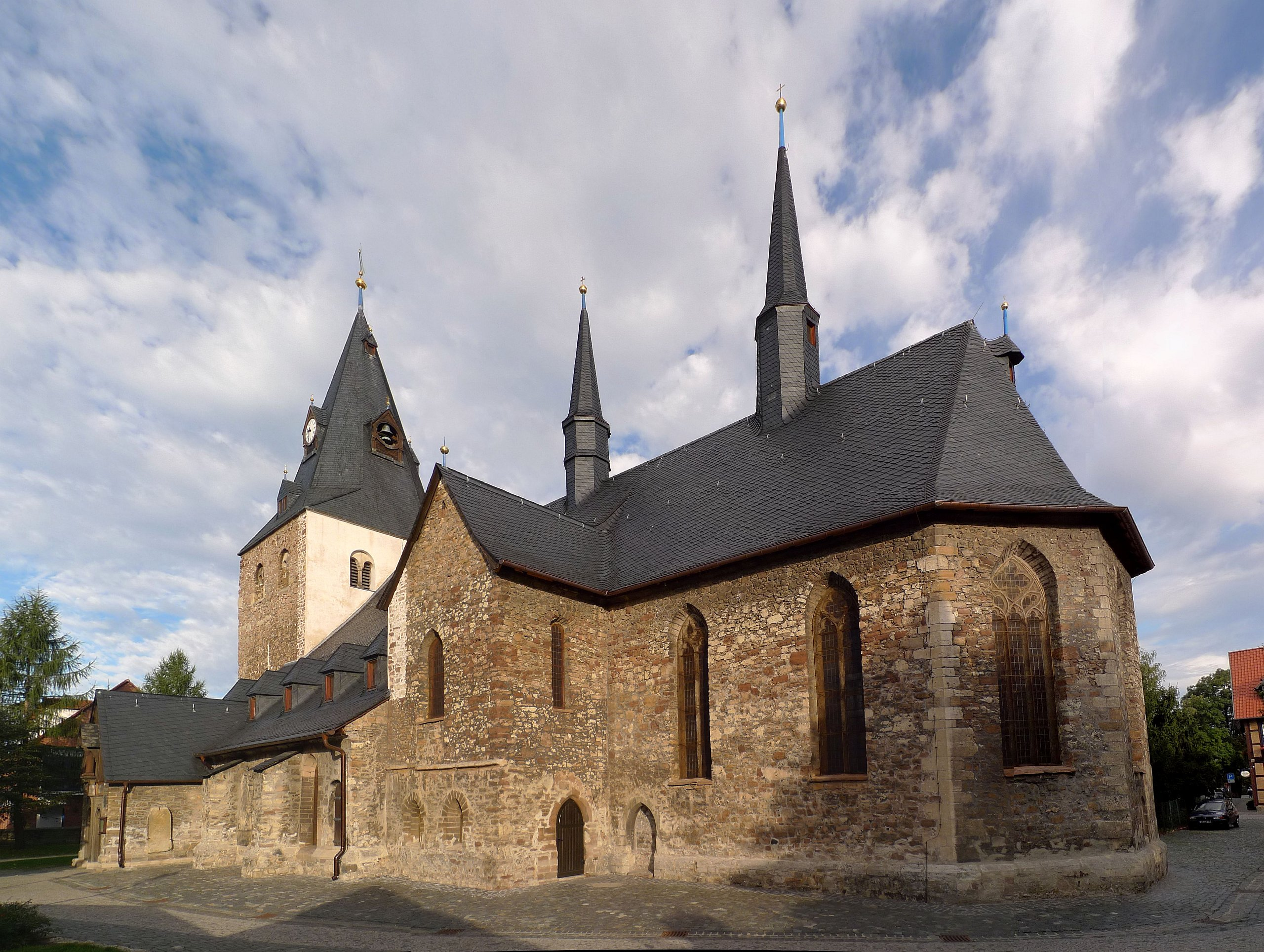
The St. Johannes Church

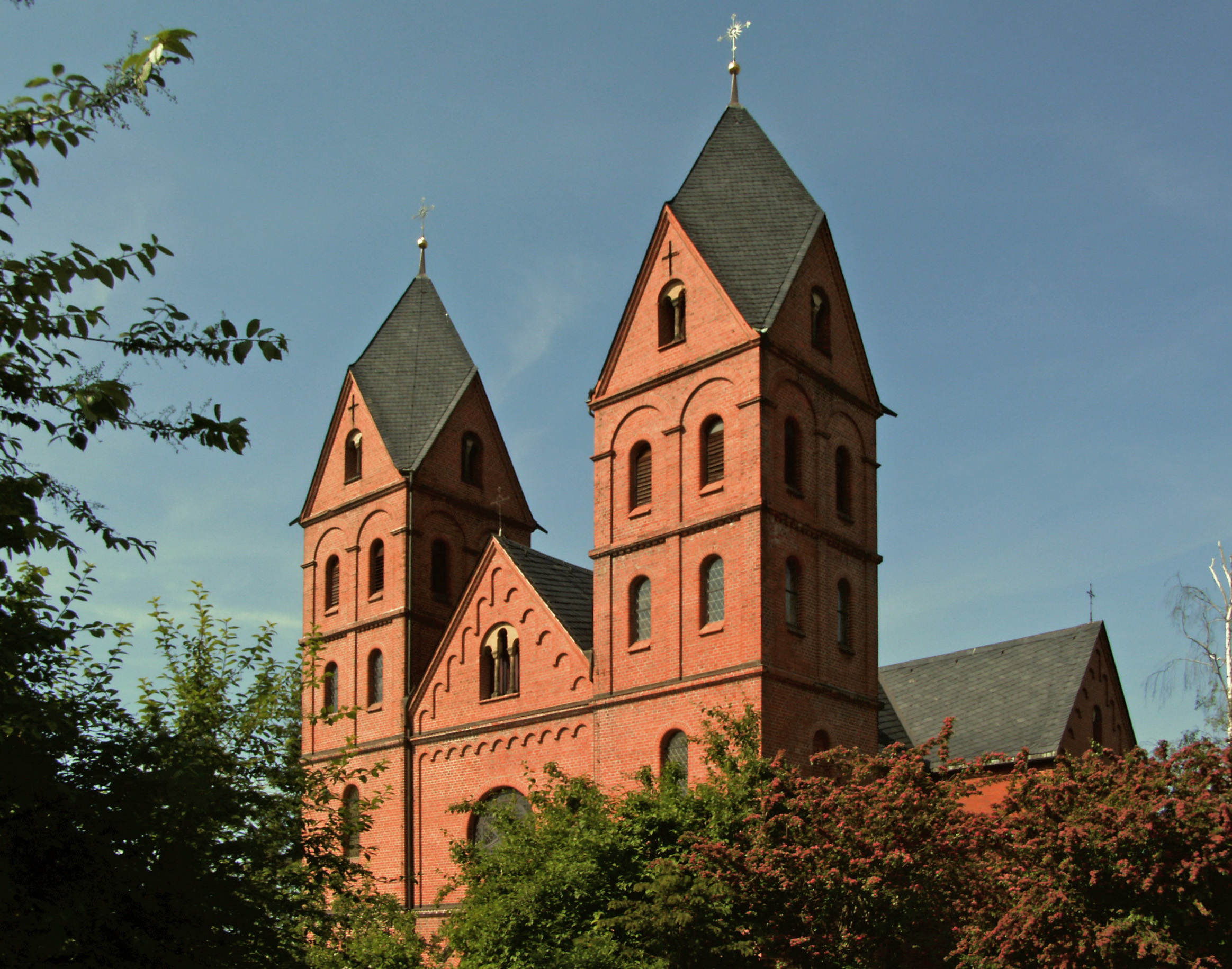
The Catholic Church

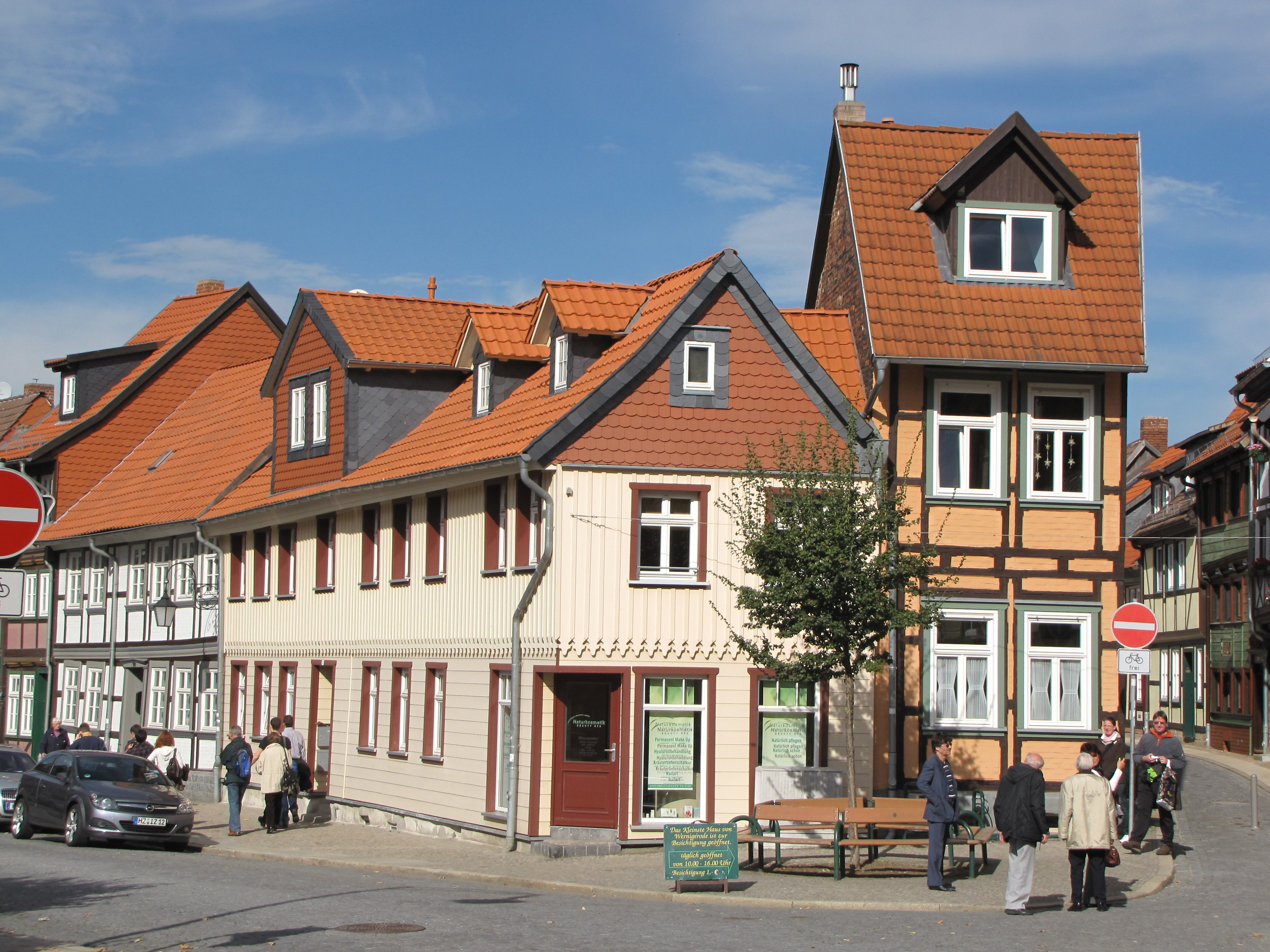
Typical old town houses

== Culture ==
Wernigerode is the home of the choir Rundfunk-Jugendchor Wernigerode.

=== Natural monuments ===
- Steinerne and Kleine Renne, and the nearby well of Wernigeröder Bürgerbrunnen
- Ottofels, rock formation with extensive views over the Harz
- Mönchsbuche, a protected beech on the old monk's way

== Sport ==
Wernigerode hosts the Brocken Marathon each October. Wernigerode's most supported club is Einheit Wernigerode, who competes in the NOFV-Oberliga, and recently qualified for the DFB-Pokal, eventually losing to SC Paderborn 07 0-10. Wernigerode also has had an American Football club, The Mountain Tigers, since 1993. During the last 19 years this team has played in Germany's Oberliga 4 and Regionaliga 3. Since its inception, it has been a mainstay for American football in the Harz region.

== Twin towns – sister cities ==
Wernigerode is twinned with:

- Carpi, Italy (1964)
- Cisnădie, Romania (2002)
- Hội An, Vietnam (2013)
- Neustadt an der Weinstraße, Germany (1989)

== Notable people ==
- Henry Ernest of Stolberg-Wernigerode (1716–1786), canon, dean and author of many hymns
- Christian Gottlieb Kratzenstein (1723–1795), physician and engineer
- Christian Frederick of Stolberg-Wernigerode (1746–1824), Count of Stolberg-Wernigerode
- Martin Heinrich Klaproth (1743–1817), chemist
- Henry of Stolberg-Wernigerode (1772–1854), Count of Stolberg-Wernigerode
- Anton of Stolberg-Wernigerode (1785–1854), chief minister in Magdeburg, governor in the Prussian Province of Saxony and Prussian Minister of State
- Heinrich Karl Beyrich (1796–1834), botanist
- Gustav Eduard von Hindersin (1804–1872), Prussian general
- Rudolf Stammler (1856–1938), jurist
- Otto Herfurth (1893–1944), general
- Wilhelm Bittrich (1895–1979), Waffen-SS General
- Friedrich Lütge (1901–1968), historian and economist
- Franz Nicklisch (1906–1975), actor
- Rolf Hermichen (1918–2014), fighter ace
- Konrad Sasse (1926–1981), musicologist
- Karl Oppermann (1930-2022), painter
- Rudolf Dannhauer (born 1934), cross-country skier
- Waldtraut Lewin (1937–2017), stage director
- Wolf Barth (1942–2016), mathematician
- Monika Wulf-Mathies (born 1942), politician
- Karin Rüger-Schulze (born 1944), track and field athlete
- Irene Ellenberger (born 1946), architect
- Lutz Unger (born 1951), swimmer
- Karsten Brandt (born 1958), cross-country skier
- Caspar René Hirschfeld (born 1965), composer
- Bernhard Schneyer (born 1968), composer
- Guido Fulst (born 1970), racing cyclist
- Jens Baxmann (born 1985), ice hockey player
- Nils Petersen (born 1988), footballer
- Christopher Grotheer (born 1992), skeleton racer
