= Brocken Garden =

Alpine botanical garden in Germany

Coordinates: 51°47′54″N 10°37′03″E

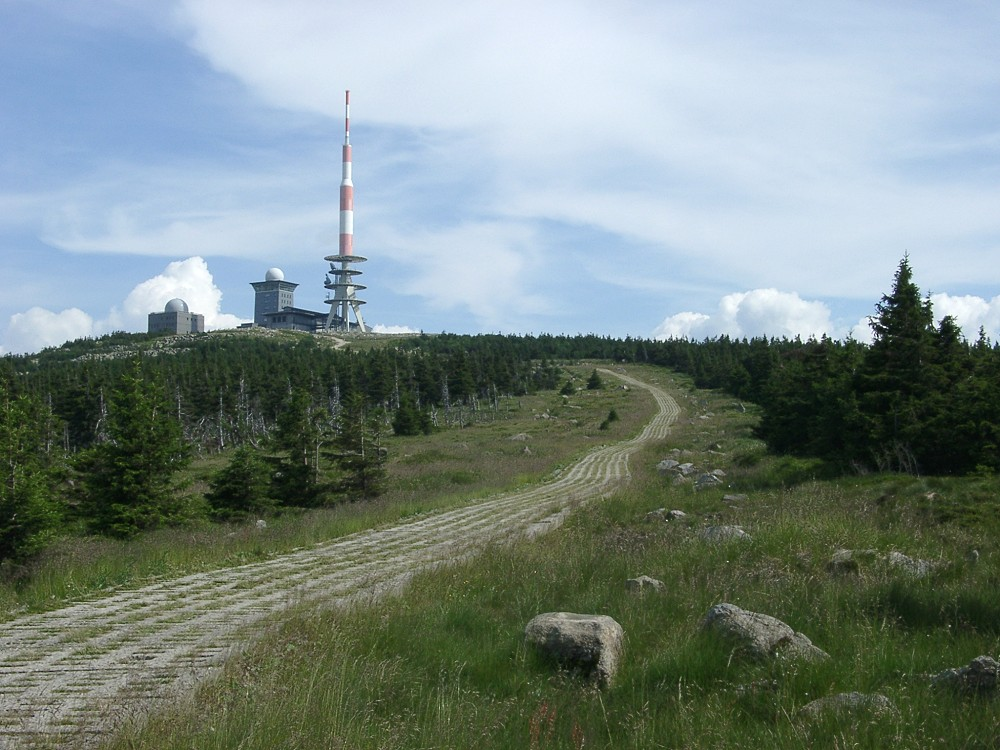
Brocken summit

The Brocken Garden (German: Brockengarten) is an alpine botanical garden on the summit of the Brocken (1,142 m above sea level), the highest peak in the Harz mountains of Germany. It lies within the Harz National Park near Wernigerode in the state of Saxony-Anhalt and has a stock of around 1,600 types of plant. These include species that only grow in the Brocken region, like the Brocken anemone or alpine pasqueflower and the Brocken hawkweed, but its main focus is on alpine plants like the white dryad and the Swiss willow. It is open daily without charge.

== History ==
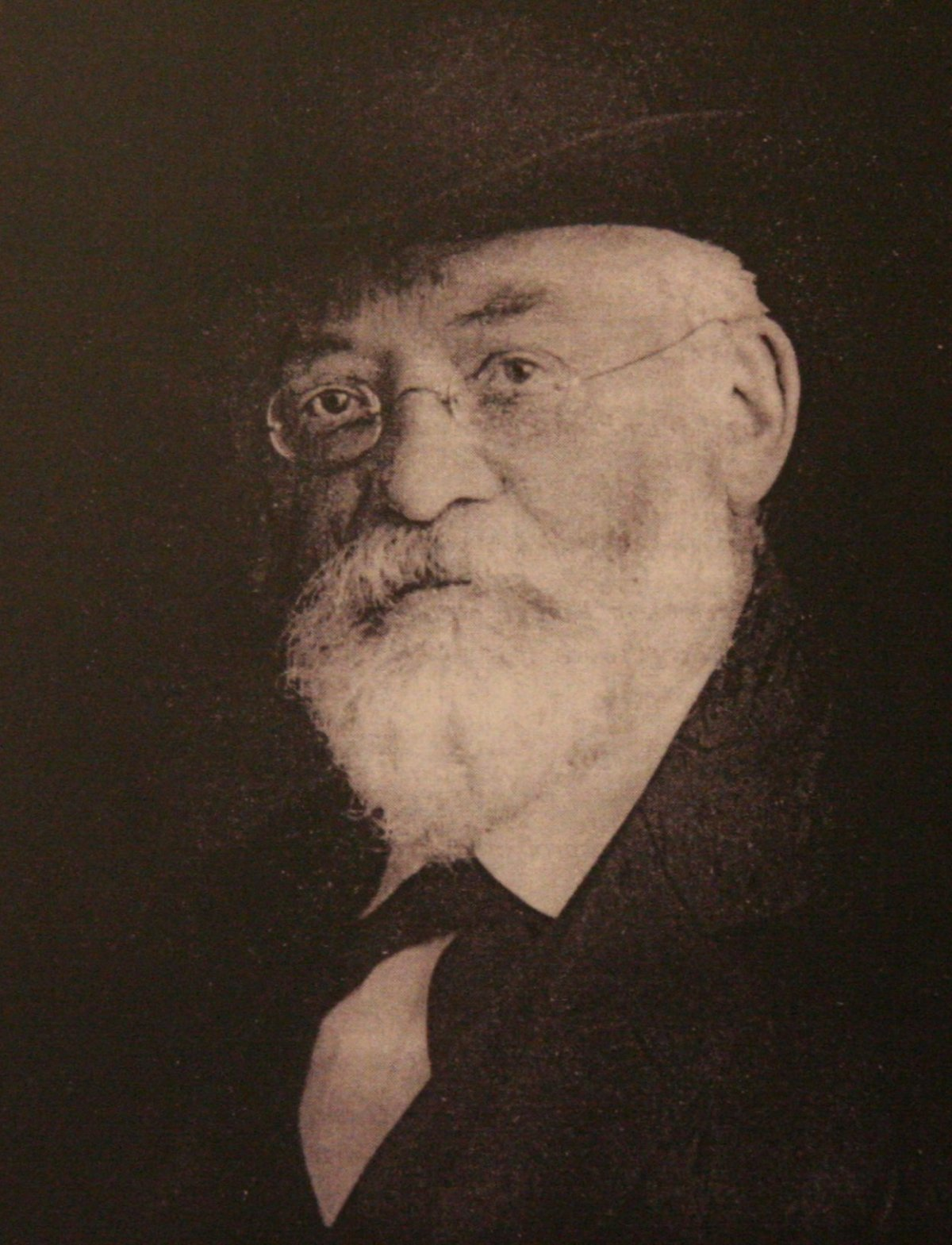
Albert Peter

By 1760 there was already a herb garden on the Heinrichshöhe and in 1761 a garden with plants from the Brocken was laid out at Schierke. But it was not until 1890 that the Brocken Garden was established by Albert Peter with the permission of Prince Otto of Stolberg-Wernigerode on the royal estate. Peter was a naturalist and head of the Botanical Garden of Göttingen. The purpose of the experimental garden was to research the adaptability of alpine plants to the conditions of a new habitat. Due to its northerly and exposed location the summit of the Brocken (1,141 m) equated climatically to heights of about 1,700 to 1,900 m in the Swiss Alps.

Until 1945 the Brocken Garden was run by scientists at the University of Göttingen. Only in the years 1914 to 1934 and 1945 to 1950 did work have to stop because of the impact of the two world wars. In 1950 the University of Halle-Wittenberg took over its upkeep.

When the Brocken was declared an out-of-bounds area the botanical garten was closed to the public in 1961 and lost its importance. In 1971 all scientific and horticultural work had to stop. In the period that followed native plants took over much of the garden. Only 90 of the hitherto 1,400 cultivated species could still be found in 1989. After the reunification of Germany the Brocken Garden was re-established jointly by the High Harz National Park and the botanical gardens of the universities of Halle and Göttingen.

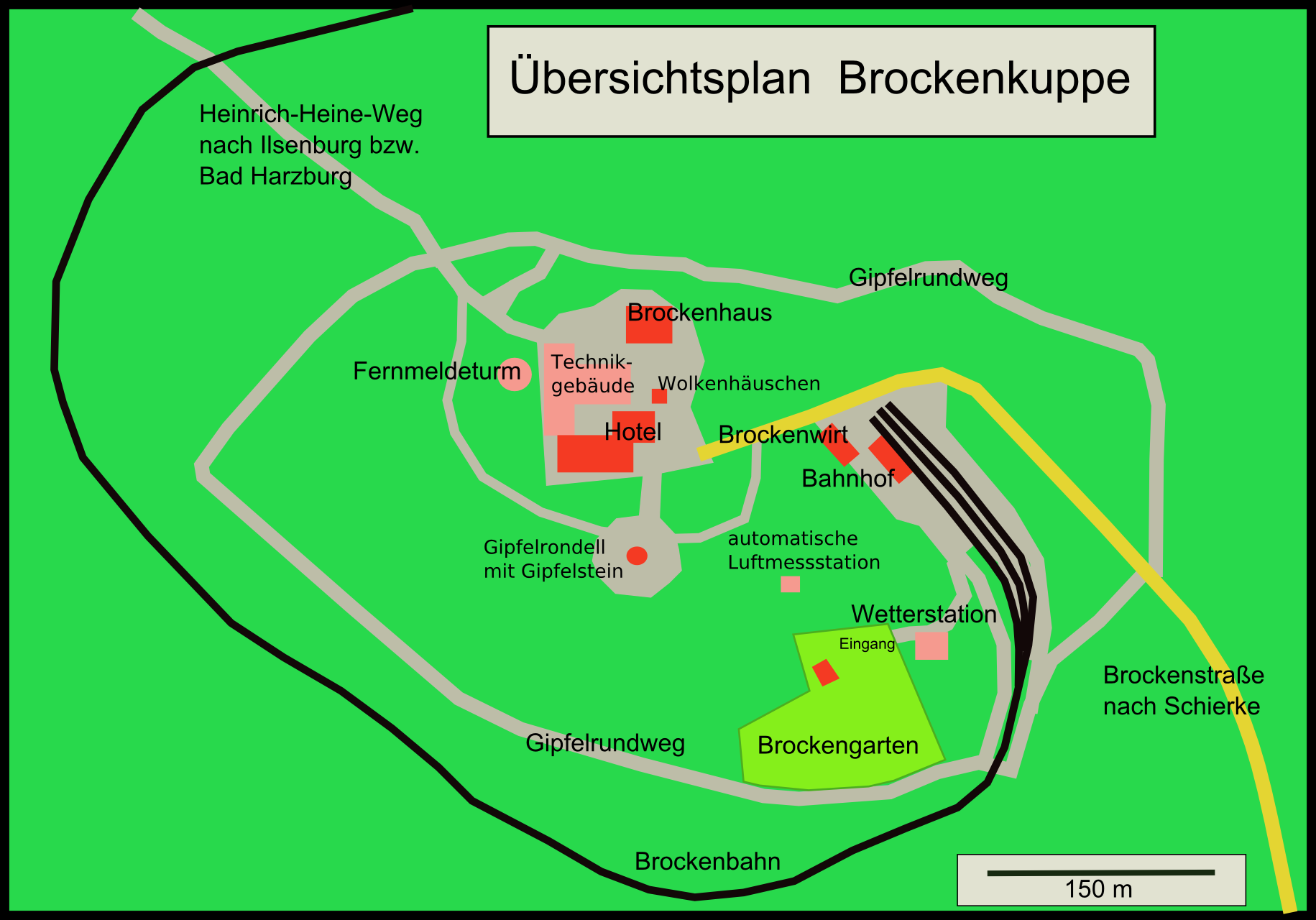
Location of the Brocken Garden on the summit of the mountain

Today the garden comprises a public viewing area and an experimental area, closed to the public, in which experiments in biotope and species conservation are carried out. In addition the garden is devoted to the renaturalisation of the Brocken summit.

The Brocken Garden is accessible to visitors between May and the middle of October. In 2008 there were around 9,000 visitors.

== Tasks ==
The Brocken Garden supports academic instruction, research, species conservation, school instruction and public information and thus the functions that were given to it by its founder, Albert Peter.

== Climate ==
The average annual temperature is 2.9 °C (based on the period 1960–1990), and there are an average of 171 days of frost and 176 days with snow cover. Only the months of July and August are generally entirely frost-free. Annual precipitation is 1,814 litres per square metre, the average annual humidity is 88 per cent and there are 306 days of mist or fog. The summit of the Brocken is one of the windiest places in Europe. The highest measured wind speed was 263 km/h (in 1984). The Brocken has a natural timber line.

== Garden dreams ==
Brocken Garden is part of the Saxony-Anhalt Garden Dreams project.

== See also ==
- List of botanical gardens in Germany

== Sources ==
- Friedrich Ebel, Wolfram Richter: Der Versuchs- und Schaugarten auf dem Brocken. Informationen über den Brockengarten. (Mitteilungen aus dem Botanischen Garten der Martin-Luther-Universität Halle 130), 1991
- Friedrich Ebel u. a.: Der Brockengarten. Ein Versuchs- und Schaugarten. Schadach, Goslar 1999, ISBN 3-928728-40-7
