= 89.0 RTL =

Coordinates: 51.482166°N 11.965814°E

- Saxony-Anhalt; Germany
- Broadcast area: Saxony-Anhalt: FM, DAB; Lower Saxony; Thuringia; Hesse; Saxony
- Frequency: 89.0 MHz

Programming
- Format: contemporary hit radio

Ownership
- Owner: RTL Group

History
- First air date: 24 August 2003

Links
- Website: 89.0 RTL

89.0 RTL is a German radio channel whose studios are located in Halle (Saale). It aims at the 14-29 age bracket.

It aired first on 24 August 2003 and replaced the radio channel Project 89.0 Digital. While it is licensed to Saxony-Anhalt, the exposed position of the Brocken at 3,743 ft allows the channel to cover large parts of central Germany, including Lower Saxony, Thuringia, Brandenburg and Saxony. It is produced in the same radio station as Radio Brocken. The channel can be received on FM 89.0 and on DAB channel 12C.

== Frequency and distribution ==
The station is broadcast on the VHF frequency 89.0 MHz from the Brocken (Harz) broadcasting location. It is considered to be one of the technically longest-reaching in Germany. Programs broadcast on it could and can be received not only in Saxony-Anhalt, but also in large parts of Lower Saxony, Thuringia, and Brandenburg. When the weather is good, the station can also be reached in Bremen and Hamburg, and in smaller parts of North Rhine-Westphalia and Hesse.

== History ==
=== 1950s through 1990s ===
The frequency was used by Radio DDR 1 and Radio Aktuell in East Germany.

After reunification, the frequency, together with several smaller filler frequencies, went to the then AH Antenne Hörfunk-Sender GmbH & Co. KG organizer in the 1990s, who initially operated the broadcaster for years and produced the program Radio Brocken for Saxony-Anhalt.

=== 2001–2003: Project 89.0 Digital ===
After the Saxony-Anhalt media authorities wanted to promote the DAB transmission standard in the 2000s, the organizer had the opportunity to start a second program on a DAB channel with Project 89.0 digitally in the same broadcasting center. Since DAB had practically no distribution at all at that time, it was also permitted to broadcast on the FM frequency 89.0 MHz. Although Radio Brocken lost its most important frequency as a result, the filling frequencies were and are still largely sufficient to cover the licensed broadcasting area of Saxony-Anhalt. Project 89.0 was used to broadcast a rock and alternative program from 2001 to 2003, which quickly built up a loyal audience, but was not very commercially successful.

=== Since 2003: 89.0 RTL ===
After the RTL Group became the most important investor in the organizer AH Antenne Hörfunk-Sender GmbH & Co. KG (renamed in 2011 Funkhaus Halle GmbH & Co. KG), a change in strategy was decided and the previous Project 89.0 digital was launched on August 24, 2003 and renamed 89.0 RTL. At the same time, the music format was changed, giving the impression of a completely new radio program. A host named Dörti-Dani took over the morning show. The former morning show host Sascha Mad Dog, the Morgenlatte Polzin was allowed to continue as a host in the afternoon under the name Sascha.

On December 6, 2018, 89.0 RTL received the Lower Saxony Media Prize in the Dialogue category for its social media show with 89.0 RTL morning show host BigNick and influencer Justin Prince. In 2016, the 89.0 RTL program The Hans Blomberg Show was awarded the German Radio Prize.

== Other services ==
In addition to the radio frequency, the program is also broadcast via Digital Audio Broadcasting (DAB) and via live streaming. A DAB+ broadcast is hosted on channel 11C in Saxony-Anhalt, on channel 12B in Thuringia, on channel 12C in Hamburg, and on channel 12A in Saxony since mid-March 2023. The DAB+ broadcast has also been available in Lower Saxony since July 2023.

In addition, 89.0 RTL produces numerous web-only music streams that are available for free on the Internet, via smart speakers and Apple CarPlay. Some of these music streams offered are Deutschrap, Workout, Partytrash [sic], and 90s. The hosts of 89.0 RTL maintain direct contact with their community, especially on Instagram, Facebook, and WhatsApp.

== Listeners ==
Year	Number
2020	128,000
2019	129,000
2014	170,000
2013	216,000
2012	200,000

== Criticism ==
The blog “Fair-Radio.net” reported in February 2014 that 89.0 RTL only broadcast recorded messages during “radio prime time” between 6 a.m. and 9 a.m. on several days in February. This was evident from the fact that the recordings of the news every hour made by Fair Radio were “identical down to the smallest sound.” The content of the “Aktuell” programs was also the same as the previous evening. This was not pointed out in the program; instead, according to “Fair Radio,” the program suggested that it was really current news.
