= Harz Mountain Run =

The Harz Mountain Run (German: Harz-Gebirgslauf) is a mountain run, that has taken place since 1978 in October in Wernigerode in central Germany. Since 1990, its programme of events has included a marathon race, the Brocken Marathon, which is reckoned to be one of the toughest in Germany. Other events include a 22 km run and an 11 km run. In 2007 a 5 km run was offered for the first time that started at the same time as the 11 km run. The event attracts several thousand participants, e.g. in 2001 there were 3,500 and, in 2004, 3,110 runners finished, including 695 men and 73 women in the marathon. The record was achieved in 1987 with over 5,000 participants.

== Brocken Marathon ==
The Brocken Marathon is "one of the great scenic marathons in Germany" and has also been recognised as one of the toughest endurance runs in Germany, not least because of the Alpine climate experienced at the summit of the Brocken, the highest mountain in the Harz. The race has been described as "one of the most beautiful nature runs" taking place as it does through the "picturesque scenery" of the Harz National Park. The run takes place on the Saturday in October each year.

The start and finish is in Hasserode, a suburb on the outskirts of the town of Wernigerode. The marathon run follows a circular route during which the highest mountain in the Harz, the Brocken (1,141 m), has to be climbed. The route entails climbing a total of 1,150 metres in height.

In 1961, the Brocken fell within the restricted area of the Inner German Border between the GDR and FRG and was therefore not allowed to be crossed. With reunification in 1990, the first "real" Brocken marathon took place with 386 runners. Two years later, crossing the Brocken was prohibited for nature conservation reasons. There has been a compromise with the National Park Administration since 1993, according to which a maximum of 1,000 runners may cross the Brocken plateau in the course of the 42,195 km long marathon which climbs through over 1,200 metres in height.

== See also ==
- List of marathon races in Europe

== Bibliography ==
- Duwe, Klaus (2008). "Brocken Marathon" in 42 mal 42: Marathon-Erlebnisse von Antalya bis Zermatt, Munich: Copress. pp. 255 ff.
- Schillings, Wolfgang (2007). Die 100 besten Tipps für den Marathon. Hamburg: spomedis.
