= Brocken =

Highest peak of the Harz mountain range in Northern Germany

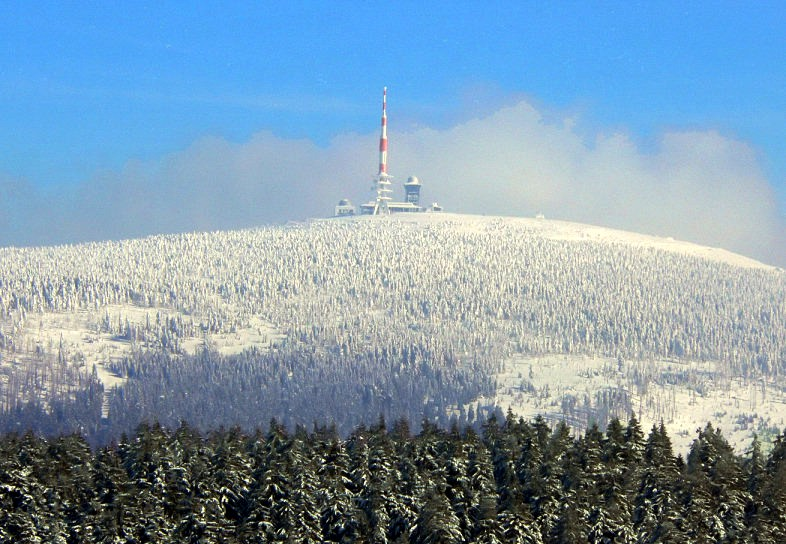
- The summit of Brocken, showing the transmitters

Highest point
- Elevation: 1,142 m (3,747 ft); Normalhöhennull
- Prominence: 856 m (2,808 ft)
- Isolation: 222.85 km (138.47 mi) to Fichtelberg
- Coordinates: 51°48′02″N 10°37′02″E

Naming
- Pronunciation: German: [ˈbʁɔkən]

Geography
- Location within Germany
- Location: Saxony-Anhalt, Germany
- Parent range: Harz

Climbing
- Easiest route: drive, hike and train

Brocken (German pronunciation: [ˈbʁɔkn̩]), also sometimes referred to as Blocksberg, is a 1,141 m (3,743 ft) mountain near Schierke in the German state of Saxony-Anhalt, between the rivers Weser and Elbe. The highest peak in the Harz mountain range, and in Northern Germany, it is subalpine, yet has a microclimate resembling that of mountains nearly 1,000 m (3,300 ft) higher. The elevation above its tree line tends to have snowcover from September to May, and mists and fogs shroud it up to 300 days a year. The mean annual temperature is only 2.9 °C (37.2 °F). It is the easternmost mountain in northern Germany.

Brocken has always played a role in legends and has been connected with witches and devils; Johann Wolfgang von Goethe took up the legends in his two-part tragic play Faust. The Brocken spectre is a common phenomenon on this misty mountain, where a climber's shadow cast upon fog creates eerie optical effects.

Today Brocken is part of Harz National Park and hosts a historic botanical garden of about 1,600 alpine mountain plants. A narrow-gauge steam railway, the Brocken Railway, takes visitors to the railway station at an elevation of 1,125 m (3,691 ft).

FM-radio and television broadcasting make major use of Brocken. The old television tower, the Sender Brocken, is now used as hotel and restaurant. It also has an observation deck, open to tourists.

== Geography ==
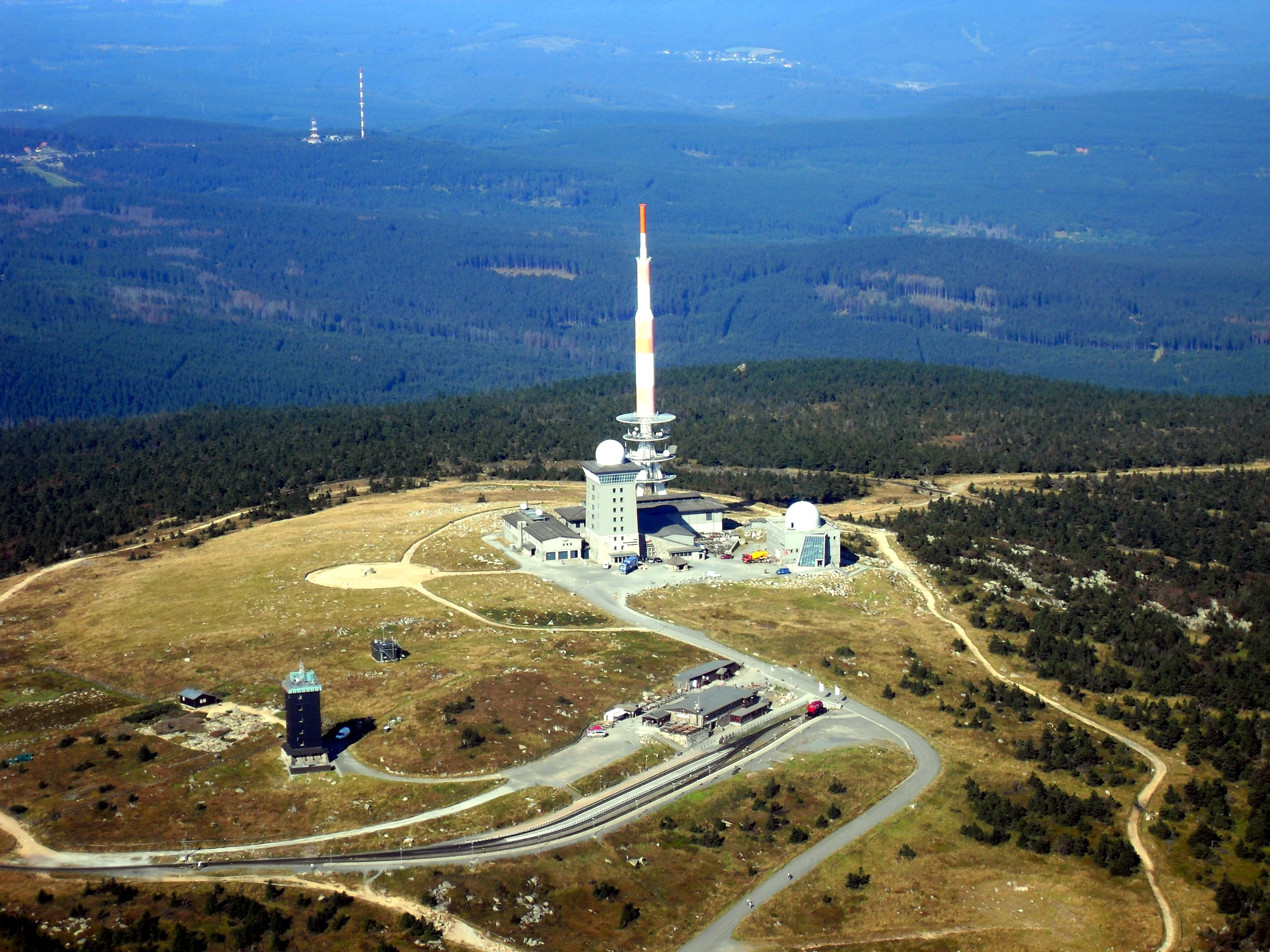
Aerial photograph of the summit (2009)

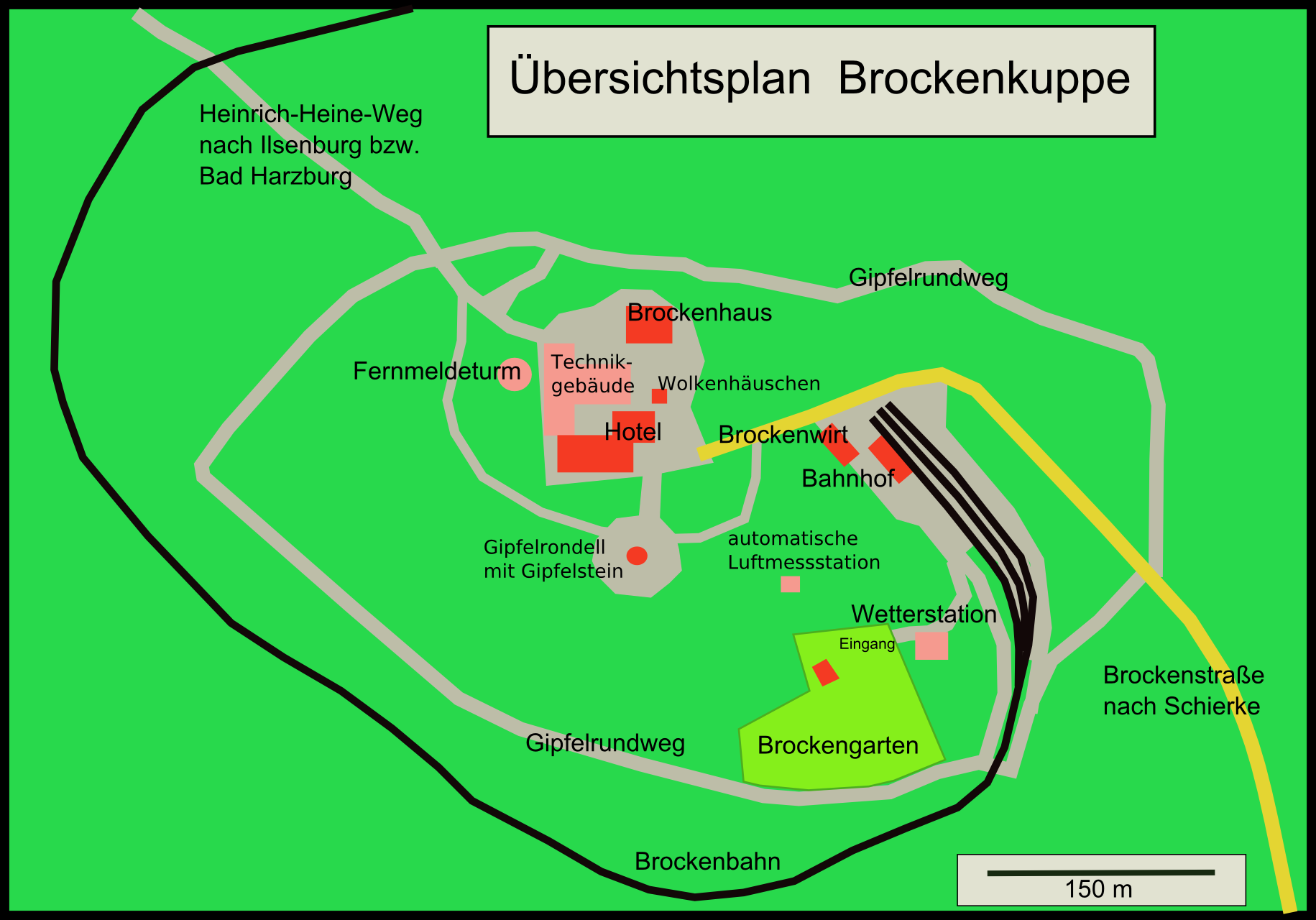
Overview plan of the Brocken summit

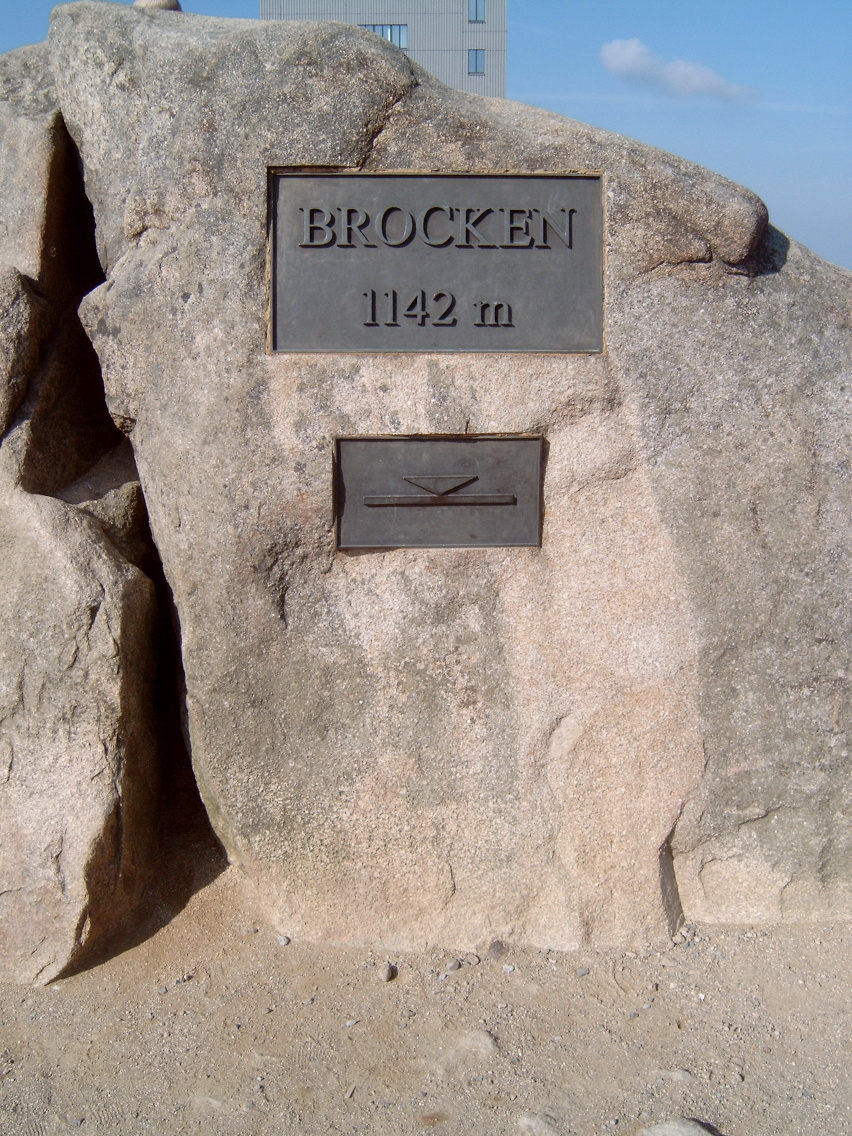
Summit stone

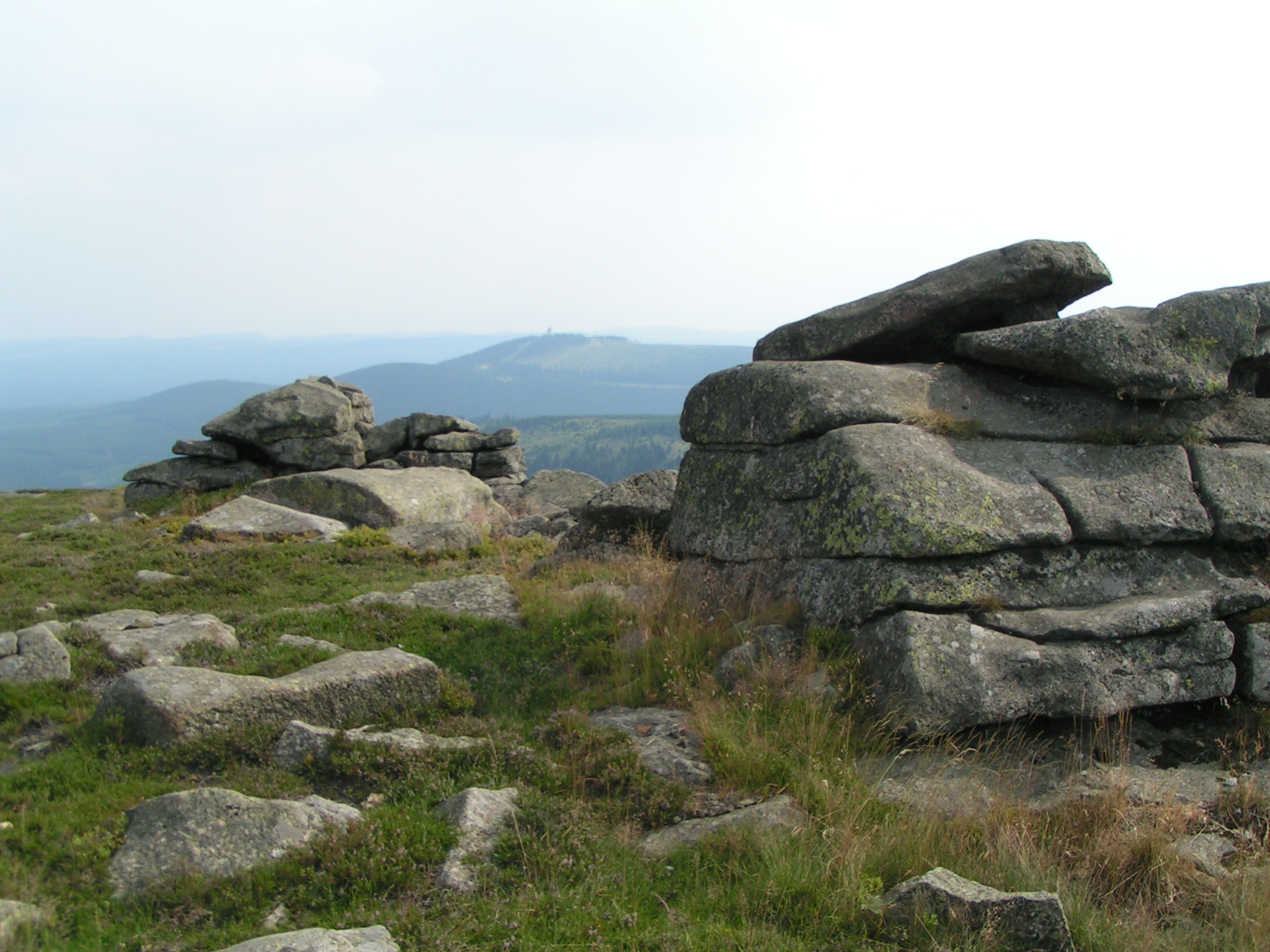
Granite on the Brocken

=== Location ===
Brocken rises over Harz National Park in the district of Harz, whose main town of Wernigerode lies about 12 kilometres (7.5 mi) east-northeast of the mountain. The state boundary with Lower Saxony runs past Brocken some 2 km (1.2 mi) to the west. At the south-eastern foot of Brocken lies the spa resort of Schierke.

Somewhat to the north below the summit of Brocken is a reservoir, Brockenteich, constructed in 1744. On or near the mountain are the source areas of the rivers Bode, Ecker, Ilse and Oder. The rounded summit of Brocken is treeless, but vegetated with dwarf shrubs.

=== Summit and subpeaks ===
The highest point on Brocken reaches an elevation of 1,141.1 m above sea level (NN) (3,744 ft). Its subpeaks include the Heinrichshöhe (1,040 m or 3,410 ft), Königsberg (1,034 m or 3,392 ft) and Kleiner Brocken ("Little Brocken") (1,018 m or 3,340 ft).

Before 1989, the height of Brocken was recorded in almost all the relevant maps and books as 1,142 m above NN (3,747 ft). A survey of the summit at the beginning of the 1990s based on the current reference system, however, gave the height as 1,141.1 m (3,744 ft). In order to provide a reference point for the old data, granite boulders were set in the mid-1990s on the highest point of Brocken to a height of approximately 1143 m, and a benchmark of "1142 m" was established on them.

=== Geology ===
From a geological point of view, Brocken and its surrounding terrain (the Brocken massif) consists mainly of granite (called Brocken granite), an igneous rock. The granitic plutons of the Harz – the Brocken, Ramberg and Oker plutons – emerged towards the end of the Harz mountain-building phase of the Upper Carboniferous, about 300 million years ago. First, alkaline magma intruded into the overlying sediments, crystallized out and formed gabbro and diorite massifs, such as the Harzburg gabbro. A little later, silica-rich granitic magma rose, some intruding into voids and gaps in the older rocks, but most being created by the melting of existing sediments. On the boundary between granite and host rock, the so-called contact zone, a great variety of transitions may be seen. For example, the summit of the Achtermannshöhe consists of contact-metamorphosed hornfels of the contact zone that, here, lies over the Brocken granite. The subsequent erosion of the Harz mountains that followed the uplifting of the Harz during the Upper Cretaceous saw the disappearance of the protective hornfels summit, thus exposing the granite that had crystallized underground during the Upper Carboniferous. The alleged hardness of Brocken granite is not the reason for the height of the mountain, but the geological fact that it was well protected by its weather-resistant hornfels crest for a long time before erosion set in.

Only in recent geological times, since the Tertiary period, did the typical, rounded, spheroidal weathering of granite outcrops and granite boulders of Brocken take place. Such blockfields are very rare in Central Europe outside the Alps and are subject to conservation measures. They originated mainly under periglacial conditions, i.e. during the course of the ice ages, and their retreat. Today's blockfields of Brocken granite, as well as other rocks in the Harz National Park, particularly in the Oker valley, are therefore at least 10,000 years old. Physical weathering, such as frost shattering, has played a key role in their formation, resulting in giant piles of loosely stacked rocks. In 2006, the granite blockfields of Brocken, together with 76 other interesting geotopes, were designated as a "National Geotope".

=== Climate ===
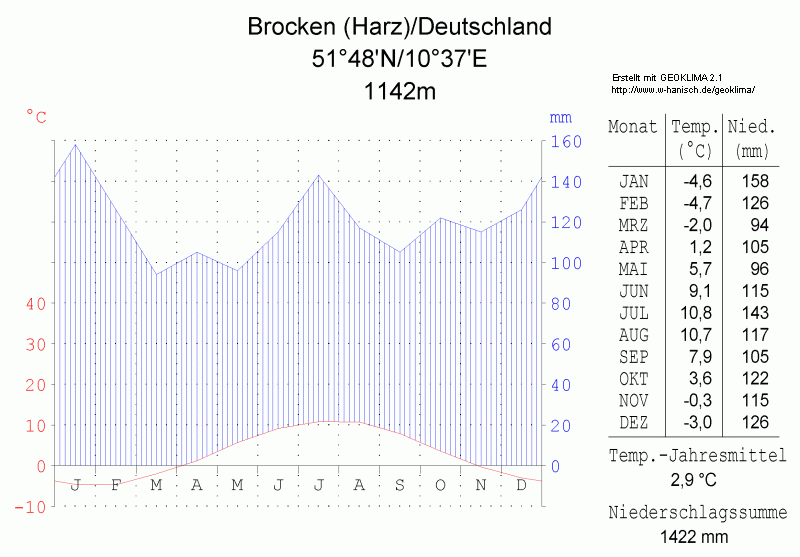
Climatic diagram for 1961-1990 normals

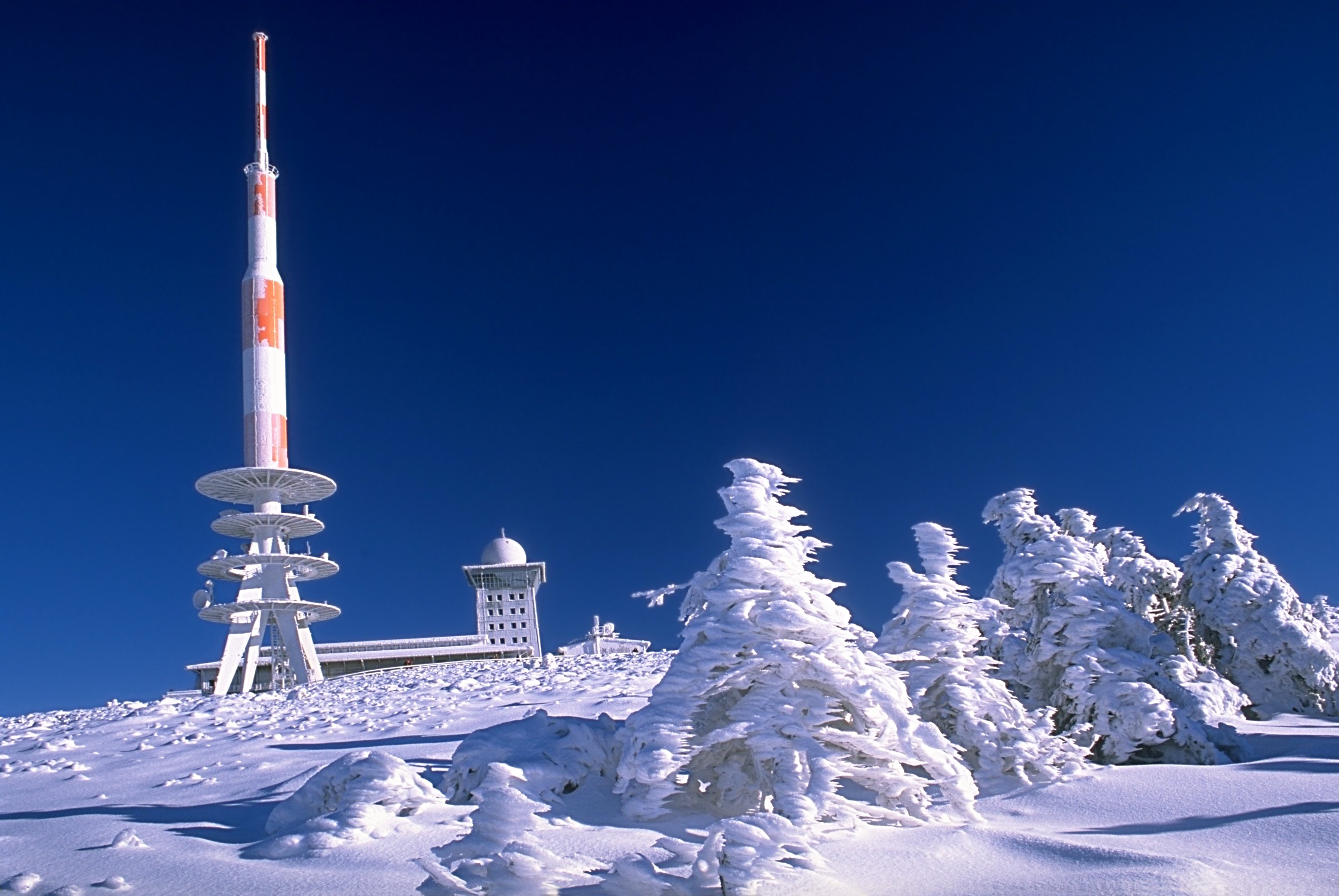
Winter landscape (2003)

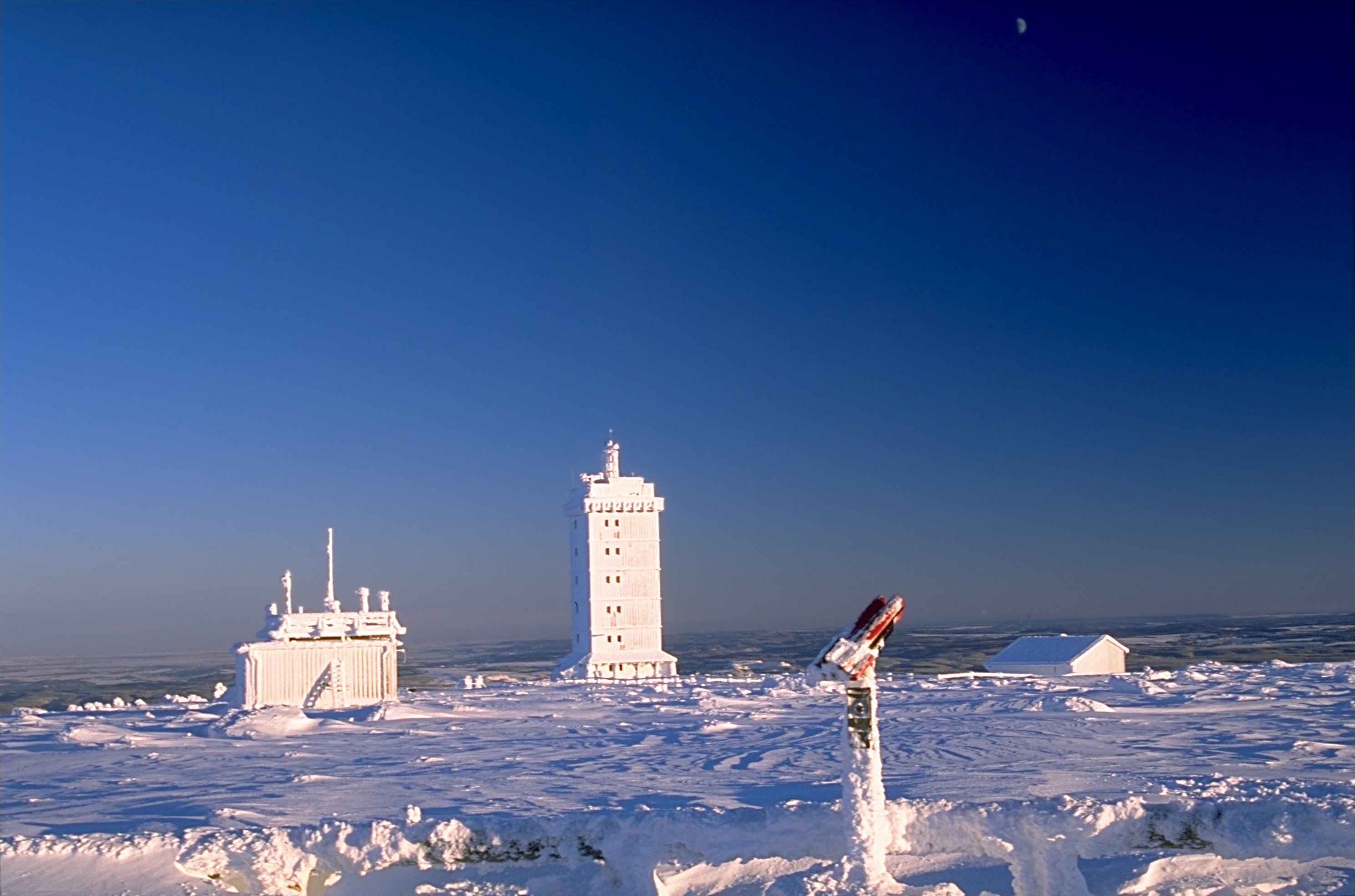
Brocken tower in winter (2001)

Brocken is a place of extreme weather conditions. Due to its exposed location in the north of Germany its peak lies above the natural tree line. The climate on Brocken is like that of the alpine 1,600–2,200-metre (5,200–7,200 ft) zone or even that of Iceland. This is due to its short summers and very long winters, with many months of continuous snow cover, strong storms and low temperatures even in summer. The summit, however, does not have an alpine climate, as the average summer temperature is above 10 °C (50 °F).

Due to its significant height difference compared with the surrounding terrain, Brocken has the highest precipitation of any point in northern central Europe, with an average annual precipitation (1961–1990) of 1,814 millimetres (71.4 in). Its average annual temperature is 2.9 °C (37.2 °F).

Brocken weather station has recorded the following extreme values:

- Its highest temperature was 29.7 °C (85.5 °F) on 25 July 2019.
- Its lowest temperature was −28.4 °C (−19.1 °F) on 1 February 1956.
- In 1973 it had 205 days of snow cover.
- Its greatest depth of snow was 380 cm (150 in) on 14 and 15 April 1970.
- Its highest measured wind speed was 263 km/h (163 mph) on 24 November 1984.
- Its greatest annual precipitation was 2,335 mm (91.9 in) in 1981.
- Its least annual precipitation was 984 mm (38.7 in) in 1953.
- The longest annual sunshine was 2004.5 hours in 1921.
- The shortest annual sunshine was 972.2 hours in 1912.

Brocken also holds the record for the greatest number of days of mist and fog in a single calendar year in Germany, 330 in 1958, and has an average of 120 days of snowfall per year.

Climate data for Brocken, (elevation 1,135 m (3,724 ft), 1991−2020 normals, extremes 1896–present)
Month	Jan	Feb	Mar	Apr	May	Jun	Jul	Aug	Sep	Oct	Nov	Dec	Year
Record high °C (°F)	14.0 (57.2)	14.6 (58.3)	17.5 (63.5)	21.4 (70.5)	24.1 (75.4)	26.7 (80.1)	29.7 (85.5)	29.0 (84.2)	25.9 (78.6)	21.9 (71.4)	19.8 (67.6)	12.5 (54.5)	29.7 (85.5)
Mean maximum °C (°F)	6.0 (42.8)	7.0 (44.6)	10.5 (50.9)	15.0 (59.0)	19.3 (66.7)	22.1 (71.8)	23.5 (74.3)	23.7 (74.7)	19.1 (66.4)	15.5 (59.9)	11.9 (53.4)	7.7 (45.9)	25.7 (78.3)
Mean daily maximum °C (°F)	−1.1 (30.0)	−1.0 (30.2)	1.4 (34.5)	6.0 (42.8)	10.1 (50.2)	13.2 (55.8)	15.4 (59.7)	15.3 (59.5)	11.1 (52.0)	6.8 (44.2)	2.9 (37.2)	0.0 (32.0)	6.7 (44.1)
Daily mean °C (°F)	−3.3 (26.1)	−3.3 (26.1)	−1.2 (29.8)	2.9 (37.2)	6.8 (44.2)	9.8 (49.6)	12.1 (53.8)	12.0 (53.6)	8.3 (46.9)	4.4 (39.9)	0.6 (33.1)	−2.2 (28.0)	3.9 (39.0)
Mean daily minimum °C (°F)	−5.4 (22.3)	−5.4 (22.3)	−3.6 (25.5)	0.1 (32.2)	3.9 (39.0)	6.7 (44.1)	9.1 (48.4)	9.2 (48.6)	6.0 (42.8)	2.3 (36.1)	−1.4 (29.5)	−4.2 (24.4)	1.4 (34.5)
Mean minimum °C (°F)	−13.2 (8.2)	−12.8 (9.0)	−9.8 (14.4)	−6.7 (19.9)	−2.6 (27.3)	0.9 (33.6)	4.0 (39.2)	4.1 (39.4)	1.2 (34.2)	−3.8 (25.2)	−7.9 (17.8)	−11.1 (12.0)	−15.9 (3.4)
Record low °C (°F)	−27.5 (−17.5)	−28.4 (−19.1)	−19.6 (−3.3)	−12.6 (9.3)	−8.7 (16.3)	−3.0 (26.6)	−0.1 (31.8)	0.0 (32.0)	−2.6 (27.3)	−10.3 (13.5)	−16.1 (3.0)	−25.0 (−13.0)	−28.4 (−19.1)
Average precipitation mm (inches)	202.9 (7.99)	145.8 (5.74)	147.5 (5.81)	86.9 (3.42)	120.3 (4.74)	117.2 (4.61)	159.3 (6.27)	131.1 (5.16)	152.7 (6.01)	171.0 (6.73)	163.2 (6.43)	204.0 (8.03)	1,799.1 (70.83)
Average extreme snow depth cm (inches)	107.2 (42.2)	127.6 (50.2)	131.1 (51.6)	83.9 (33.0)	11.9 (4.7)	0.3 (0.1)	0 (0)	0 (0)	0.5 (0.2)	8.7 (3.4)	32.3 (12.7)	69.8 (27.5)	155.2 (61.1)
Average precipitation days (≥ 0.1 mm)	25.7	23.5	23.6	18.8	19.6	19.6	20.9	20.1	22.3	25.1	25.6	26.4	271.1
Average snowy days (≥ 1.0 cm)	30.2	27.8	30.0	19.2	3.1	0.1	0	0	0.2	5.1	15.3	26.5	159.0
Average relative humidity (%)	89.6	88.8	89.2	82.6	82.3	84.2	83.0	83.2	88.9	91.1	90.5	89.5	86.9
Mean monthly sunshine hours	61.8	72.0	107.8	162.7	187.0	181.4	184.6	177.0	131.0	93.5	55.2	49.0	1,462.9
Source 1: NOAA
Source 2: Deutscher Wetterdienst / SKlima.de

=== Flora ===
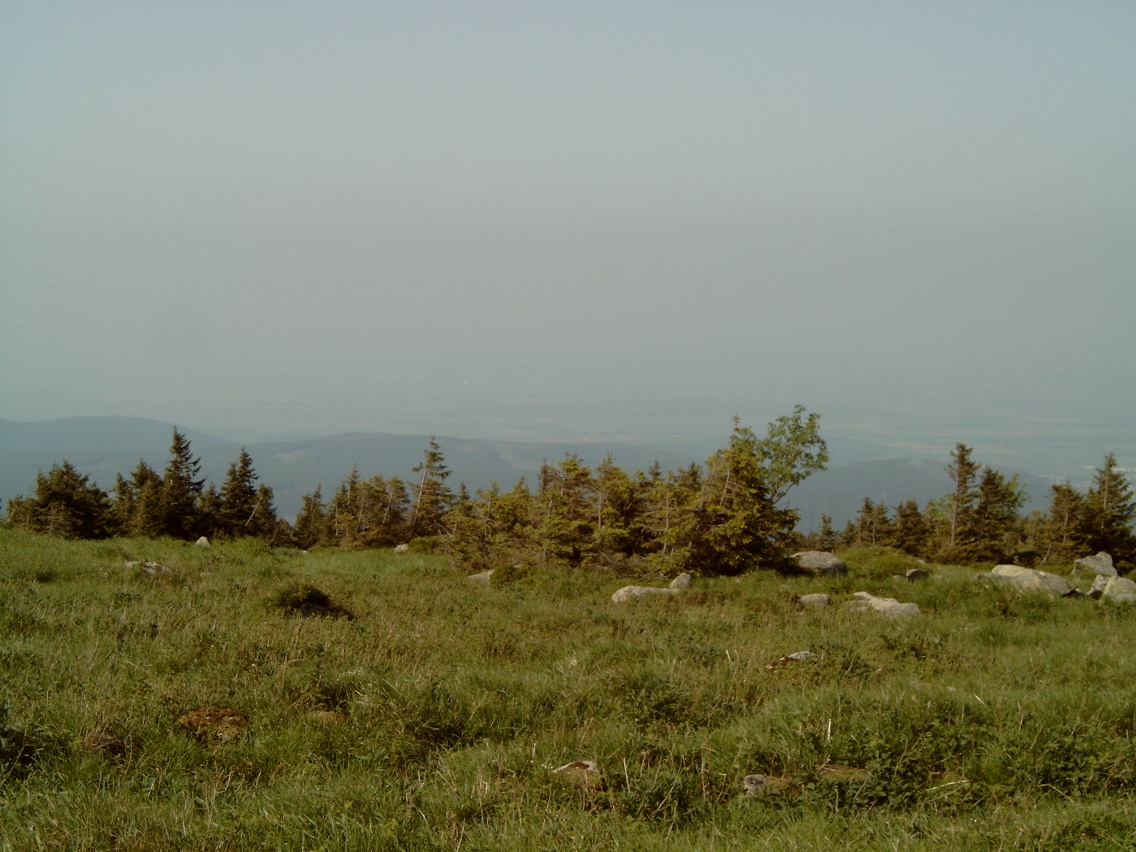
The treeline on the Brocken

The harsh climate of Brocken makes it a habitat for rare species. The mountain's summit is a subalpine zone with flora and fauna almost comparable to those of north Scandinavia and the Alps. Brocken is the only mountain in Germany's Central Uplands whose summit lies above the natural treeline, so that only very small spruce grow there and much of it is covered by a dwarf shrub heathland. In the Brocken Garden, established in 1890, flora are nurtured by national park employees; visitors are allowed to view it as part of regular guided tours. The garden does not just display plants from Brocken, but also high mountain flora from other regions and countries.

Amongst the rare species of Brocken that are found nowhere else in northern Germany and which occur above about 1,050 m above NN (3,440 ft) are the variant of the alpine pasqueflower known as the Brocken flower or Brocken anemone (Pulsatilla alpina subsp. alba), hawkweeds like the Brocken hawkweed (Hieracium negrescens) and the alpine hawkweed (Hieracium alpinum), vernal grass (Anthoxanthum nipponicum), the alpine lady's mantle (Alchemilla alpina) and the alpine clubmoss (Diphasiastrum alpinum).

On the raised bogs around the summit of Brocken there are typical bog species like cottongrasses, sundews, dwarf birch (Betula nana) and the black crowberry, which is also referred to here as Brocken myrtle (Brockenmyrte).

=== Fauna ===
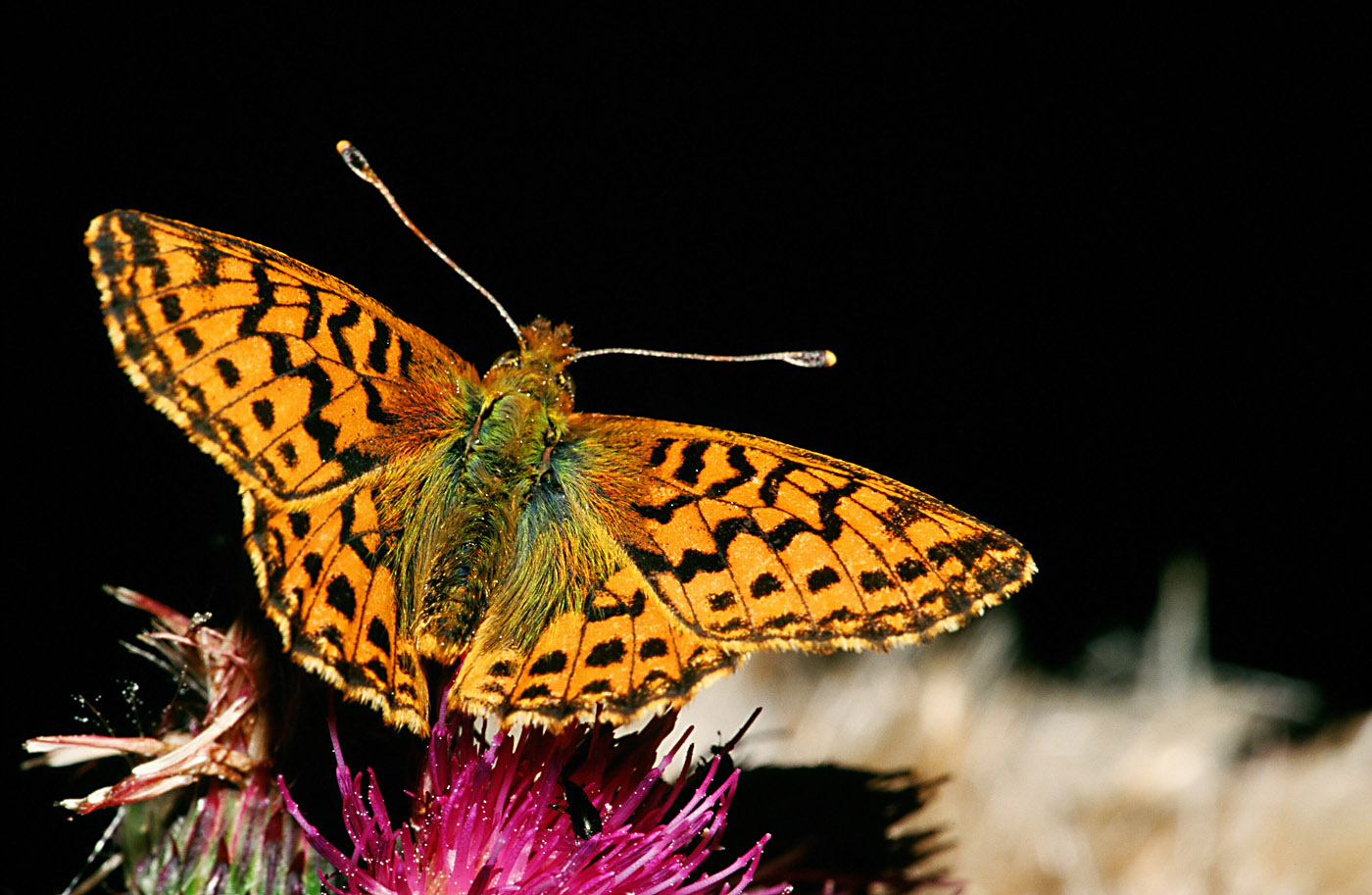
The cranberry fritillary (Boloria aquilonaris)

Several animal species have adapted to the conditions of life on Brocken. For example, the water pipit (Anthus aquaticus) and the ring ouzel both breed in the area around the summit.

The viviparous lizard occurs on Brocken in a unique, dark-colored variant, Lacerta vivipara aberr. negra. The common frog (Rana temporaria) can also be found here. Insects are very numerous. There are many beetles including ground beetles such as Amara erratica, and hundreds of species of butterfly. The cabbage white here produces only one generation per year compared with two in the lowlands.

Some mammal and bird species that occur here are relics of the ice age, including the northern bat (Eptesicus nils soni), the alpine shrew (Sorex alpinus) and the ring ouzel.

== History ==
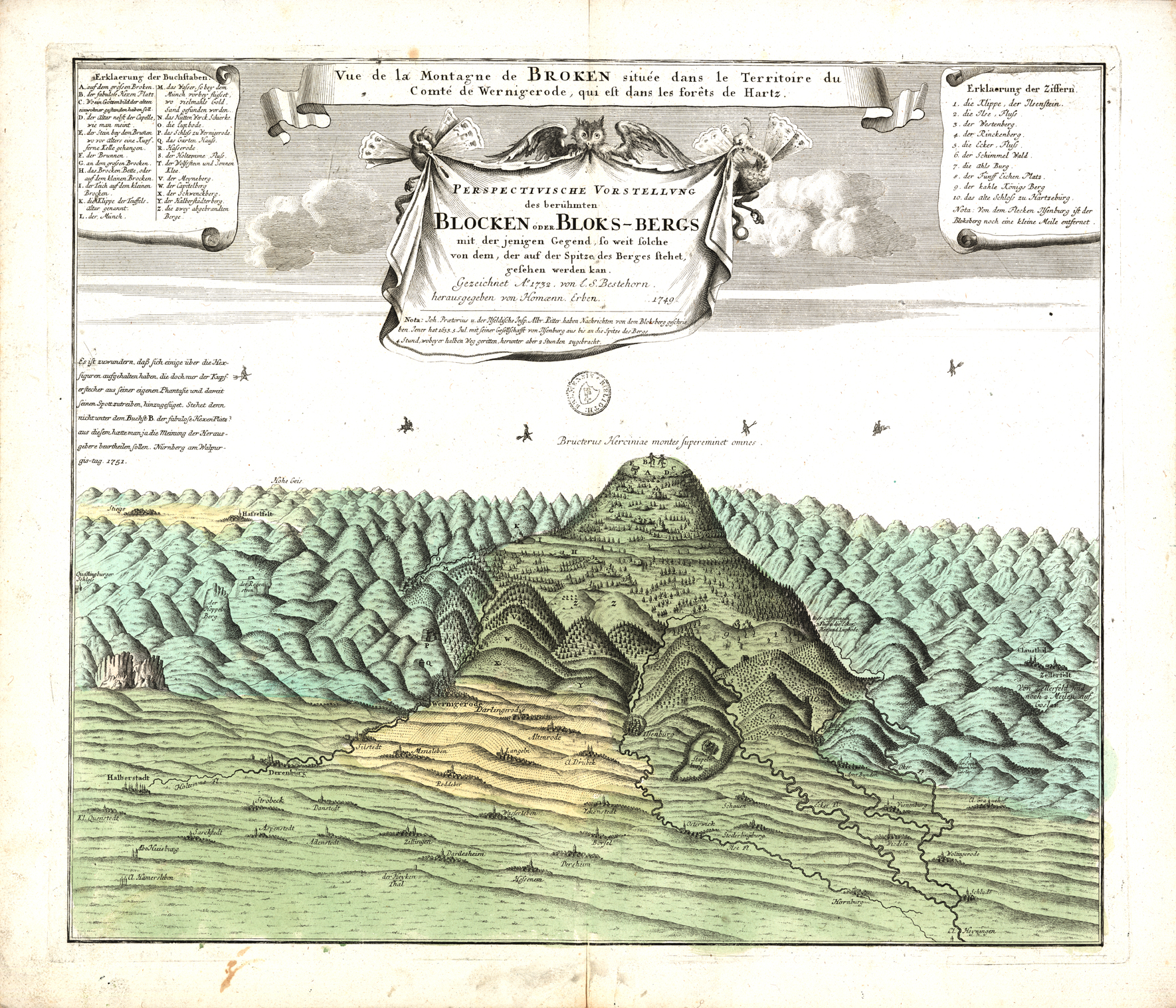
Map of the Brocken, L.S. Bestehorn, 1732. (Note the illustration of witches)

=== Ascent, construction and use ===
The first documented ascent of Brocken was in 1572 by the physician and botanist, Johannes Thal from Stolberg, who in his book Sylva Hercynia described the flora of the mountain area. In 1736 Count Christian Ernst of Stolberg-Wernigerode had the Wolkenhäuschen ("Clouds Cabin") erected at the summit, a small refuge that is still preserved. He also had a mountain lodge built on the southern slope, named Heinrichshöhe after his son Henry (Heinrich) Ernest. The first inn on the summit of Brocken was built around 1800.

Between 1821 and 1825 Carl Friedrich Gauss used the line of sight to the Großer Inselsberg in the Thuringian Forest and the Hoher Hagen mountain near Göttingen for triangulation in the course of the geodesic survey of the Kingdom of Hanover. A measurement carried out by the military staff of Prussia in 1850 found Brocken's height to be at its present level of 1,141.1 metres (3,744 ft). After the first Brocken lodge had been destroyed by a fire, a new hotel opened in 1862. The Brocken Garden, a botanical garden, was laid out in 1890 by Professor Albert Peter of Göttingen University on an area of 4,600 m^{2} (50,000 sq ft) granted by Count Otto of Stolberg-Wernigerode. It was Germany's first Alpine garden.

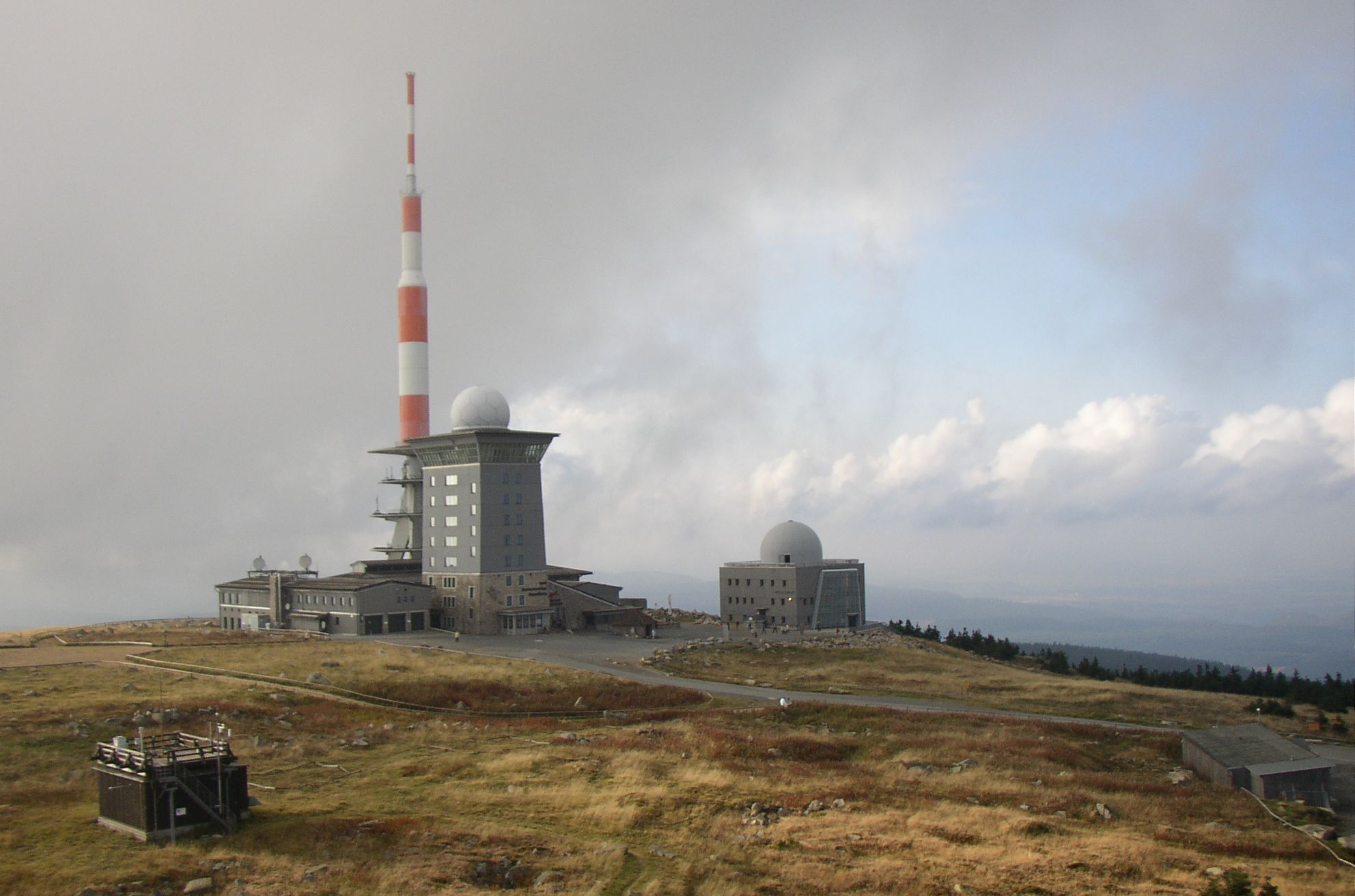
View from the weather observation platform of the weather station on Brocken peak (2006)

The narrow-gauge Brocken Railway was opened on 27 March 1899. Brocken station is one of the highest railway stations in Germany lying at a height of 1,125 m above NN (3,691 ft). Its gauge is 1,000 mm (3 ft 3 3/8 in). In 1935 the Deutsche Reichspost made the first television broadcast from Brocken using a mobile transmitter and, in the following year, the first television tower in the world was built on the mountain; carrying the first live television broadcast of the Summer Olympics in Berlin. The tower continued functioning until September 1939, when the authorities suspended broadcasting on the outbreak of World War II.

In 1937 Brocken, together with Wurmberg, Achtermann and Acker-Bruchberg were designated as the Upper Harz (Oberharz) nature reserve.

During an air attack by the United States Army Air Forces on 17 April 1945, the Brocken Hotel and the weather station were destroyed by bombing. The television tower, however, survived. From 1945 until April 1947, Brocken was occupied by US troops. As part of the exchange of territory (specified at the Yalta Conference), the mountain was transferred to the Soviet occupation zone. Before the Americans left Brocken in 1947, however, they disabled the rebuilt weather station and the television tower.

The ruins of the Brocken Hotel were blown up in 1949. From 1948 to 1959 part of Brocken was reopened to tourists. Although a pass was required, these were freely issued. From August 1961 Brocken, which lay in East Germany's border zone, immediately adjacent to West Germany, was declared a military exclusion zone and was therefore no longer open to public access. Extensive military installations were built on and around the summit. The security of the area was the responsibility of the border guards of the 7th Schierke Border Company, which was stationed in platoon strength on the summit. For accommodation, they used Brocken railway station. The Soviet Red Army also used a large portion of territory. In 1987, goods traffic on the Brocken Railway ceased due to poor track conditions.

Brocken was extensively used for surveillance and espionage purposes. On the summit were two large and powerful listening stations, which could capture radio traffic in almost all of Western Europe. One belonged to Soviet military intelligence, the GRU, and was also the westernmost outpost of the Soviets in Germany; the other was Department III of the Ministry for State Security in the GDR. The listening posts were codenamed "Yenisei" and "Urian". Between 1973 and 1976 a new modern television tower was built for the second channel of the GDR's television service, the Deutscher Fernsehfunk. Today it is used by the public Zweites Deutsches Fernsehen (ZDF) television network. The Stasi (East German secret police) used the old tower until 1985, when they moved to a new building – now a museum. To seal the area, the entire Brocken plateau was then surrounded by a concrete wall, built from 2,318 sections, each one 2.4 tonnes (2.6 short tons) in weight and 3.60 metres (11.8 ft) high. The whole area was not publicly accessible until 3 December 1989. The wall has since been dismantled, as have the Russian barracks and the domes of their listening posts. Today the old tower beside the lodge again is home to a weather station of the Deutscher Wetterdienst.

Following the fall of the Berlin Wall, beginning on 3 December 1989, Brocken was again open to the public during a demonstration walk. With German reunification there was a gradual reduction in border security facilities and military installations from 1990. The last Russian soldier left Brocken on 30 March 1994. Brocken summit was restored at a cost of millions of Euros. It is now a popular tourist destination for visitors to the Harz.

As a protected area since 1939 and due to the decades of restricted access the unique climate of Brocken provided outstanding conditions. The massif is partly still covered with primary forest extremely rare in Germany. It provides perfect conditions for endangered and nearly extinct species like the Eurasian lynx, wildcats and capercaillies. Brocken was therefore declared part of a national park in 1990.

=== Name and significance ===
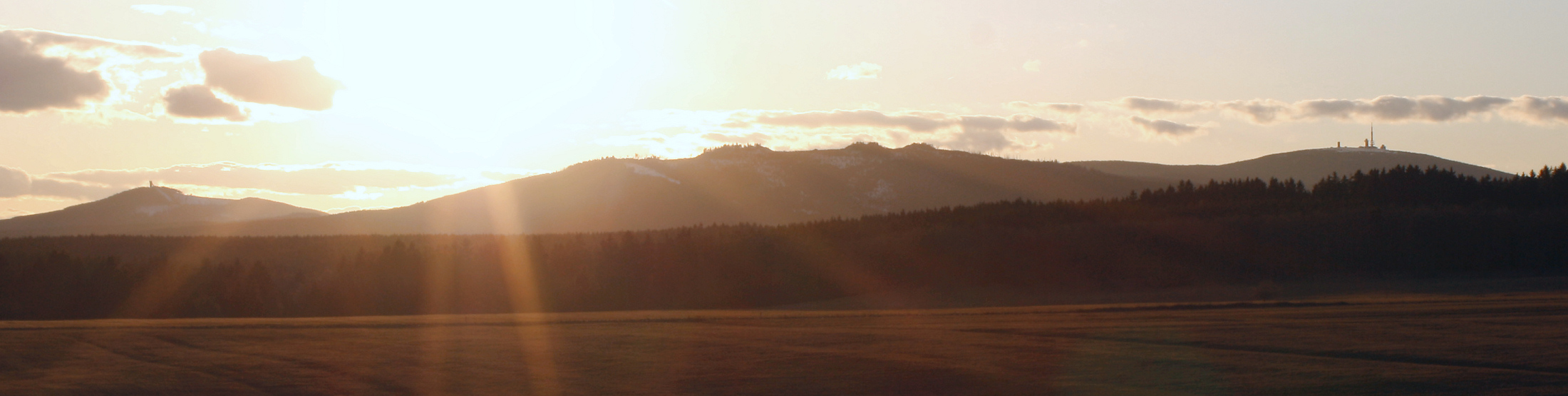
The Wurmberg, Hohnekamm and Brocken (from left) from the Büchenberg near Elbingerode

The widespread use of the name "Brocken" did not occur until towards the end of the Middle Ages. Hitherto the region had just been described as the Harz. This was primarily because, until then, the focus had been mining. The first record of a placename that resembles the present name of the mountain goes back, however, to the year 1176 when it is referred to as broke in the Saxon World Chronicle (Sächsische Weltchronik). Another early written reference to the mountain, this time as the Brackenberg, appears in 1490 in a letter from Count Henry of Stolberg. Other early documented names of Brocken were, in 1401, the Brockenberg, in 1424 Brocberg, in 1495 mons ruptus (Latin), in 1511 the Brogken and Brockin, in 1531 Brogken, in 1540 Brokenberg and, in 1589, Brackenberg. In Old Saxon-Germanic times, a large portrait of Wodin is supposed to have been found on Brocken. In addition, animal and human sacrifices were offered by the Saxons to their supreme god, Odin, on the blockfields of the summit until they renounced them as part of their baptismal vows when Christianity spread to the region under Charles the Great.

As far as the origin of the name is concerned, there are several interpretations: In the town records (Stadtbuch) of Osterwieck an entry for Brocken was found in the year 1495 under the Latin name of mons ruptus, which means "broken hill". Its Low German name, broken, as the mountain had become named in 1176 in the Saxon World Chronicle and also in English, means "broken". On the one hand, this explanation of its meaning can be attributed to the fact that the two mountains, "Kleiner Brocken" and "Großer Brocken", were formed by the breakup of a single massif. On the other hand, its meaning may refer to the serious erosion of the mountain. In other words, it refers to the fact that Brocken was eroded or "broken down" to its present size.

But the most likely derivation of the name comes from the shape of the mountain as a whole. A brocken in German is a large, shapeless mass. The size of Brocken may thus have given it its name. Since the term "block" has a similar meaning, this could also be the derivation of its alternative name, the Blocksberg. The true origin of the name Blocksberg, however, should not be seen as "block" in the sense of "mass", but rather the German word block (as in block of wood) in witchcraft.

Another theory holds that the name "Brocken" is derived from bruch, a word used in northern Germany for bog or moor, which commonly used to be spelt as bruoch or brok. It is however doubtful that this fact was primarily responsible for its name. Another possibility is that its name is derived from the fields of boulders strewn over the summit and the slopes of the mountain. This derivation for the name "Brocken" is, however, unlikely because such blockfields are also found on other mountains in the Harz. Moreover, the regions concerned were hardly known at the time when the term was used. Another presumption is based on the reference in a letter written in 1490 by Count Henry of Stolberg-Wernigerode, where he uses the term Brackenberg. However the suggestion that this referred to old, unusable timber, which was called bracken, is disputed.

=== 2023 Storm Ciarán ===
In 2023, Brocken was hit by the major European windstorm Storm Ciarán, reaching wind speeds up to 144km/h (89mph), becoming the peak wind for the country during the storm.

== Tourism ==
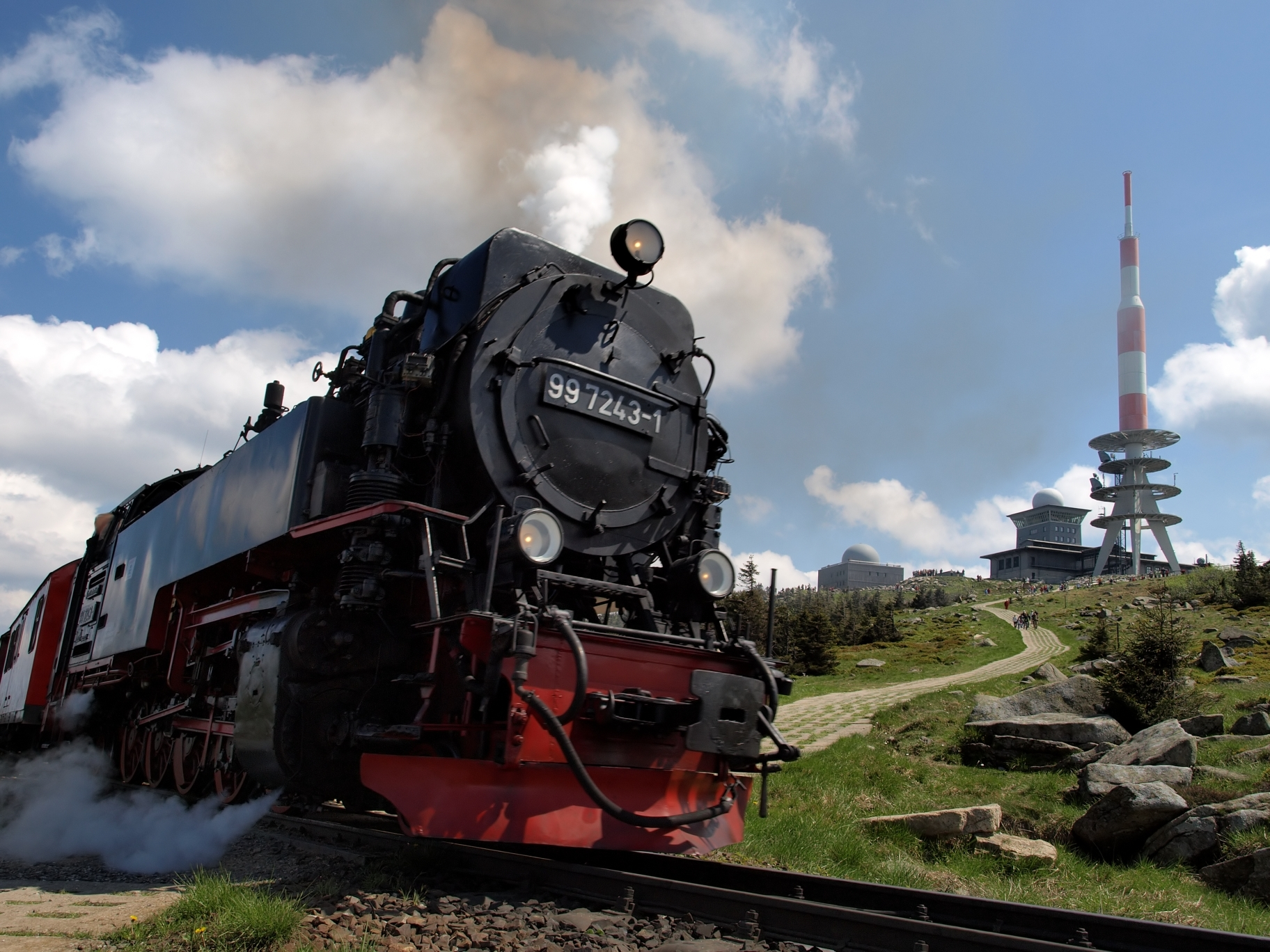
View of the Brocken from the Heinrich Heine Way. In the foreground, the Brocken Railway (2008)

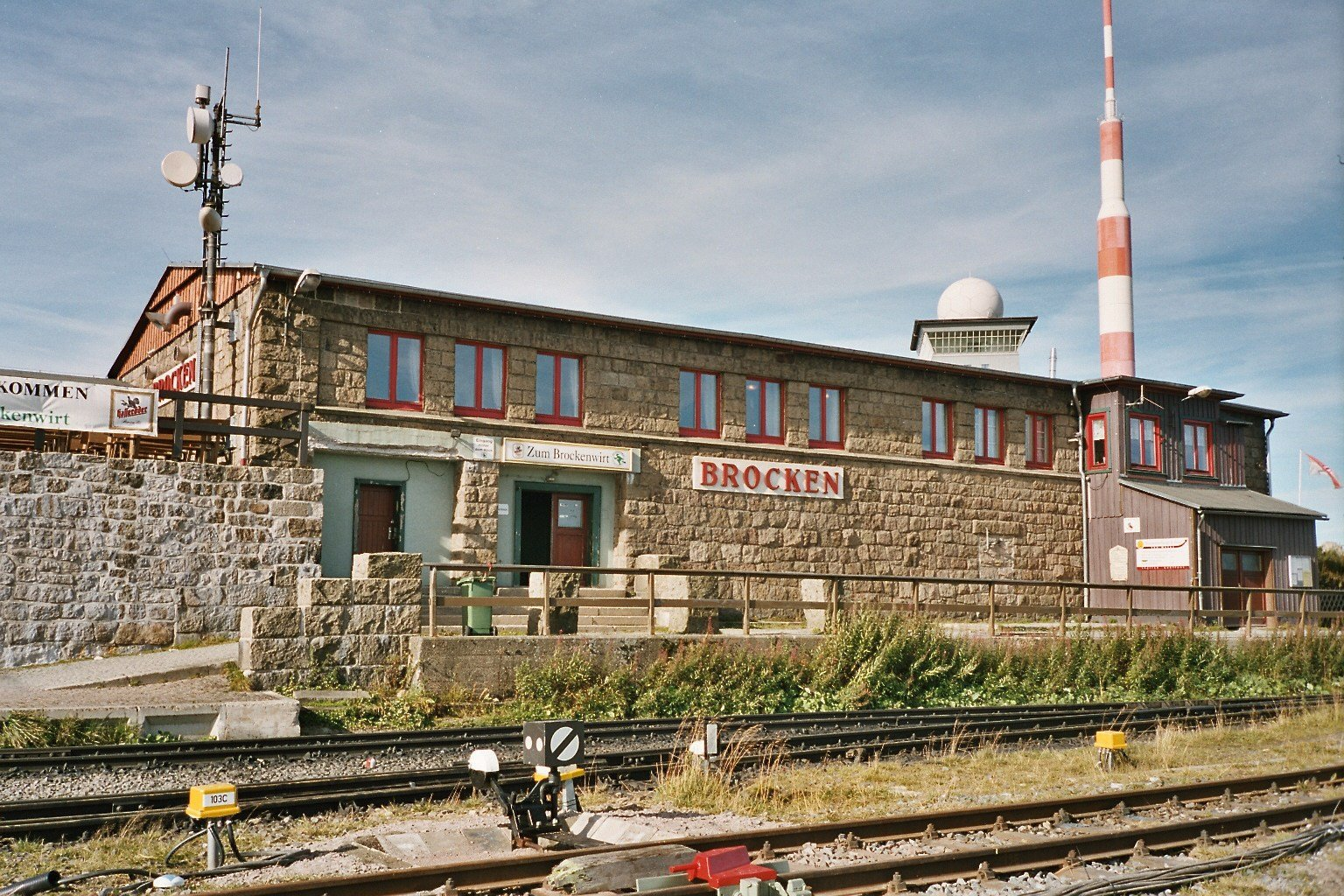
Brocken station (2004)

Today a narrow-gauge railway, the Brocken Railway, once more shuttles between Wernigerode, Drei Annen Hohne, Schierke and the Brocken. The trains are regularly hauled by steam locomotives.

At the summit is the Brockenhaus with a museum on the history of the mountain and the Brocken Garden (a botanical garden), which is managed by the Harz National Park. In addition there are restaurants and the Brocken Hotel, which is run by the Brocken publican (Brockenwirt), Hans Steinhoff. Important publicans in the past included Johann Friedrich Gerlach from 1801 to 1834, Carl Eduard Nehse between 1834 and 1850, who brought out a map of the Brocken in 1849 and the Brocken Register (Brockenstammbuch) in 1850, as well as Rudolf Schade from 1908 to 1927, who considerably increased the repute and the size of guest facilities on the Brocken.

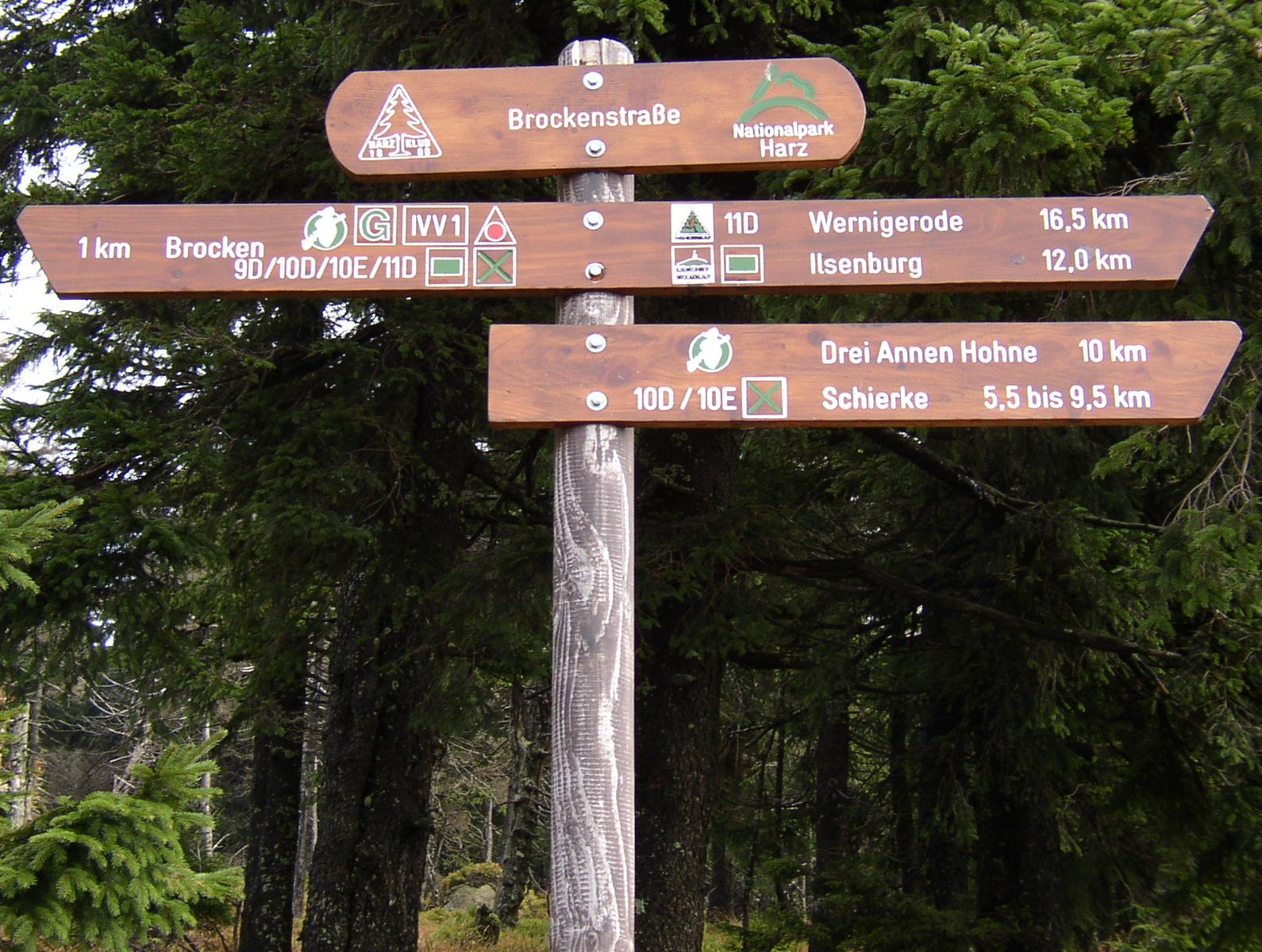
Signpost on the Brocken Road (Brockenstraße)

The area around the Brocken is especially popular with hikers. The Goethe Way (Goetheweg) is a well known trail that leads to the summit of the Brocken. It is named after Johann Wolfgang von Goethe, who more-or-less followed this route in 1777. Many paths lead to the local towns of Schierke, Braunlage and Sankt Andreasberg. The 100-kilometre-long (62 mi) Harz Witches' Path also runs from the Brocken eastwards to Thale and westwards via Torfhaus and Altenau to Osterode. The "Bad Harzburg Devil's Path" runs from the Brocken to Bad Harzburg. Mountain bikers also use the trails.

From Schierke a metalled road leads to the summit, which is used by horse-drawn wagons, as well as touring and racing cyclists. Because of the situation in the national park, vehicles with internal combustion engines are only allowed with special permission.

There are also hiking paths to Brocken from Schierke, Wernigerode and Ilsenburg.

Worthy of special mention is the bearer of the Badge of Honour of Saxony-Anhalt, Benno Schmidt (born 1932) – also known as Brocken Benno – of Wernigerode, who has climbed the mountain since 1989, almost daily, with more than 8,888 ascents (as of September 2020) and whose feat has been registered in the Guinness Book of World Records.

== Sports ==
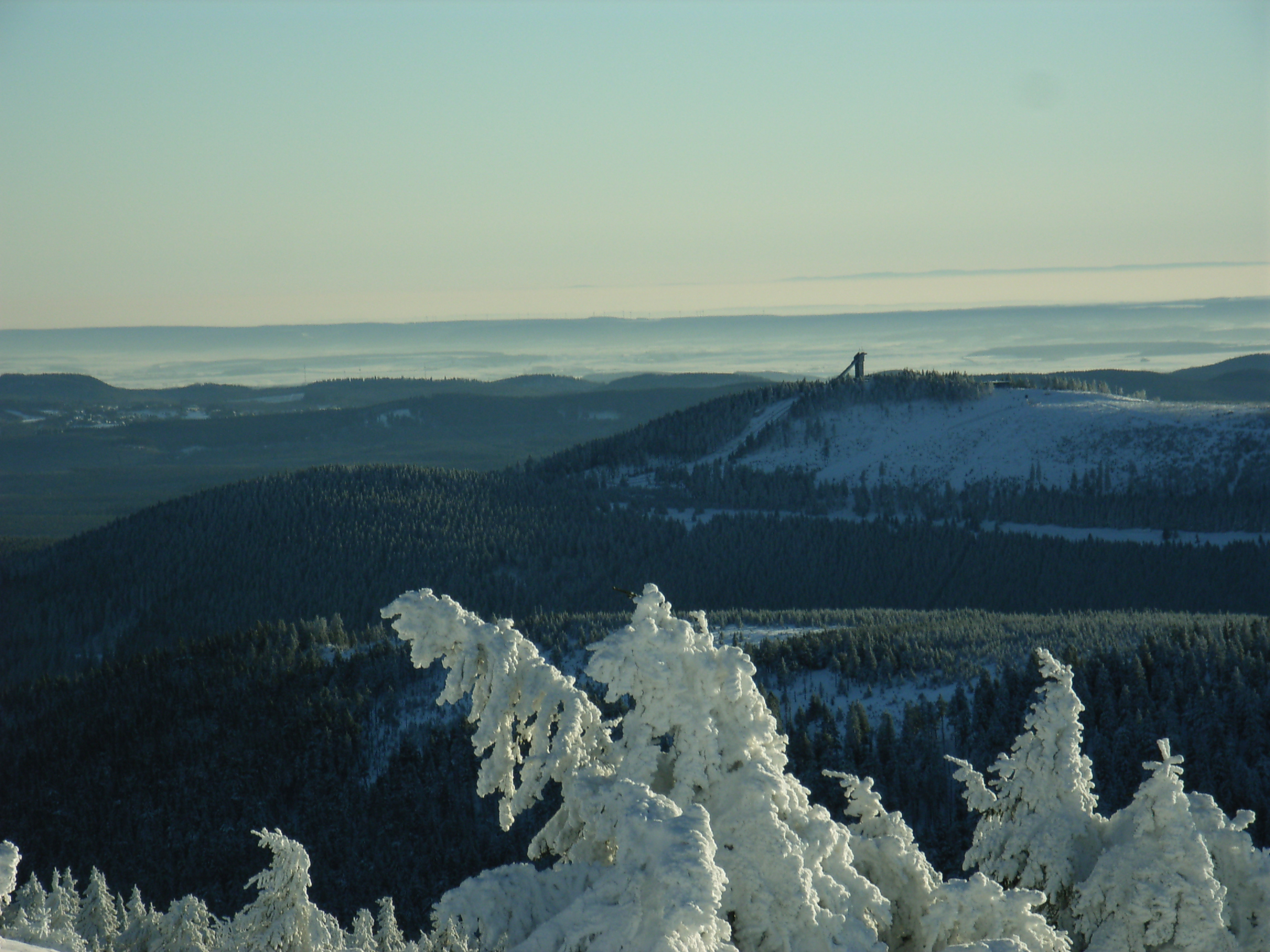
View of the Wurmberg Ski Jump

Two well-known running events pass over the Brocken: the Ilsenburg Brocken Run (beginning of September, 26 kilometres or 16 miles, of which 12 kilometres or 7.5 miles uphill, has taken place since the 1920s) and the Brocken Marathon which is part of the Harz Mountain Run with its start and finish south of Wernigerode. Both start in the valley, climb the Brocken and return. The most challenging part in each case is the last four kilometres to the Brocken summit, for which in both races, a separate mountains classification is given. This section is a concrete slab track with a steady incline of about 20% and the runners are exposed above the tree line, often to a sharp, icy wind. Of the just under 1,000 people who usually achieve it, only 50 negotiate this section without stopping to walk.

Since 2004, the Brocken Challenge, an ultra marathon 84-kilometre-long (52 mi) from Göttingen to the Brocken summit, has been staged in February each year. The proceeds from this event go to charity. The runs are conducted in accordance with the rules of the national park.

The 87-kilometre-long (54 mi) "Brocken Climb" from Göttingen to the Brocken has taken place annually since 2003. More than 300 people take part in these two-day hikes in June.

In early May each year the Braunschweig-Brocken Ultra Run takes place with 2 × 75 km (46.5 mi) legs spread over two days. The participants run from Braunschweig to Schierke, cross the Brocken, overnight in Schierke and run back again the next day. Overall, it is therefore a 150-kilometre (93 mi) race.

== Buildings ==
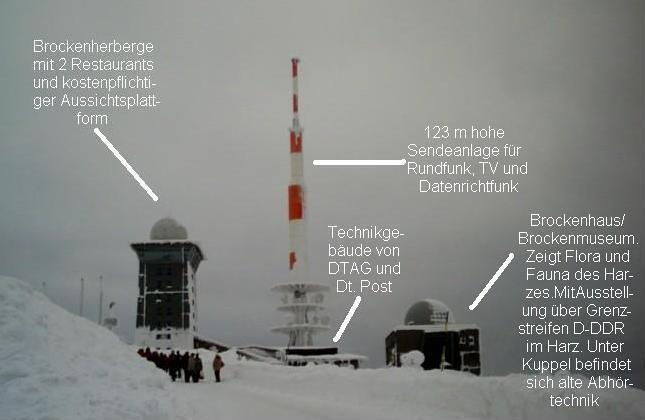
The Brocken: buildings and installations (as at 2006)

=== Transmission site ===
Since the 1930s various radio and television transmitters have been erected on the Brocken, see Brocken Transmitter.

=== Brocken House ===
Brocken House (Brockenhaus), the modern information centre for the Harz National Park, is located in the converted "Stasi Mosque" (Stasi-Moschee), a former surveillance installation for the Ministry for State Security. The historic antenna equipment in the dome may be visited. Behind the building is checkpoint No. 9 on the Harzer Wandernadel hiking trail network.

=== Weather station ===
The extreme weather conditions of the Brocken are of special meteorological interest. From 1836 the Brockenwirt, who also ran the guest house and restaurant, kept meteorological records. The first weather station on the Brocken was built in 1895. Technically poor and too small, it was partially demolished in 1912 and replaced with a large stone construction, the Hellman Observatory, that was not completed until the First World War. In 1917 the academic and nature lover George Grobe took over running the observation post, his daughter supporting him until his death in 1935. Today's weather station started life in 1939. Measurements were interrupted at the end of the Second World War as a result of military bombardment, but began again in 1947. On 16 March 2010 the Brocken Weather Station became a climate reference station to provide uninterrupted, long-term climatic observations.

== Literary mentions ==
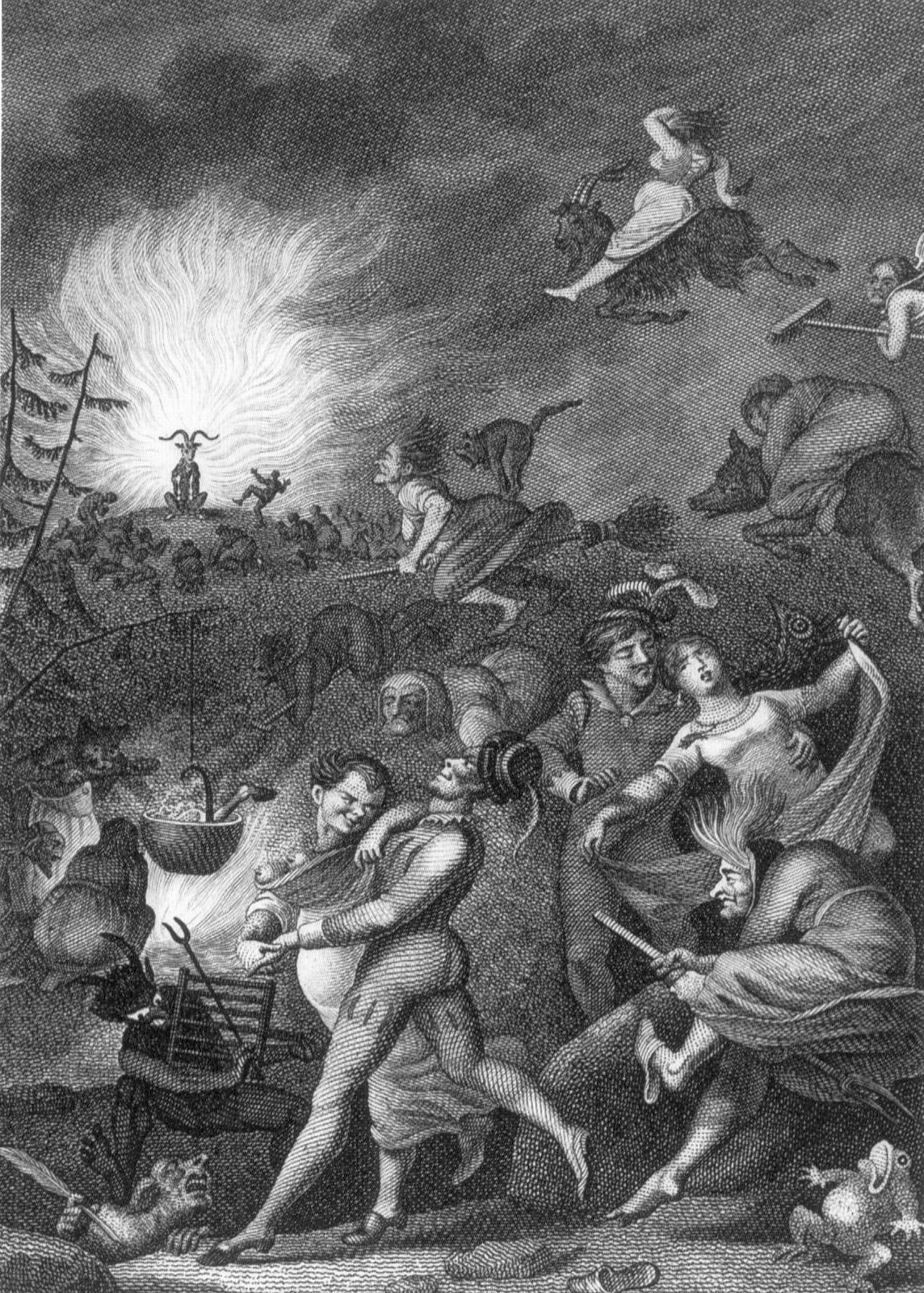
Walpurgis' Night, engraving after an illustration by Johann Heinrich Ramberg, 1829

- Goethe described the Brocken in his Faust, first published in 1808, as the center of revelry for witches on Walpurgisnacht (30 April; the eve of St Walpurga's Day).

Now, to the Brocken, the witches ride;
The stubble is gold and the corn is green;
There is the carnival crew to be seen,
And Squire Urianus will come to preside.
So over the valleys, our company floats,
With witches a-farting on stinking old goats.

Goethe may have gained inspiration from two rock formations on the mountain's summit, the Teufelskanzel (Devil's Pulpit) and the Hexenaltar (Witches' Altar).

- The Brocken is similarly mentioned in many other literary and musical works based on Faust
- Another famous visitor on the Brocken, author Heinrich Heine, wrote his book Die Harzreise ("The Harz Journey") published in 1826. He says:

The mountain somehow appears so Germanically stoical, so understanding, so tolerant, just because it affords a view so high and wide and clear. And should such mountain open its giant eyes, it may well see more than we, who like dwarfs just trample on it, staring from stupid eyes.

- The summit register entry Many stones, tired bones, views: none, Heinrich Heine ("Viele Steine, müde Beine, Aussicht keine, Heinrich Heine") is a popular, though unsourced phrase related to the weary ascent and the mostly foggy conditions.
- The teacher Heinrich Pröhle collected the Brockensagen tales and legends as well as the etymology of the geographic names in the Harz. He carefully examined the Teufelskanzel and the Hexenaltar, mentioned above.
- Henry James has his character Basil Ransom ask: "What kind of meetings do you refer to? You speak as if it were a rendezvous of witches on the Brocken" in the first chapter of his novel The Bostonians (1886).
- Slothrop and Geli Tripping experience the famous Brocken spectre in Thomas Pynchon's novel Gravity's Rainbow, as the Mittelbau-Dora labour camp in the Harz mountains north of Nordhausen from 1943 was the home of the V-2 rocket production. In David Foster Wallace's Pynchon-influenced Infinite Jest the characters Remy Marathe and Hugh Steeply also experience the Brocken spectre on a ridge in the desert outside Tucson.

== In popular culture ==
- "Black Sabbath", the first track of the debut album of the early occult rock band Coven, starts with the line "They journeyed far to Brocken Mountain pinnacle".
- The progressive metal band Fates Warning titled their debut album Night on Bröcken (note the "Heavy metal umlaut"). The title track refers to Witches Sabbath on Walpurgis Night.
- The song "Born in a Burial Gown" by Cradle of Filth (from the album Bitter Suites to Succubi) contains an allusion to the Brocken's history as a witches' gathering-place.
- The indie rock band Liars' album They Were Wrong, So We Drowned is a concept album loosely based on tales of the gatherings of witches on the Brocken as well as witch trials.
- The novel Cloud Castles by Michael Scott Rohan features the Brocken as the home and body of Chernobog
- Bibi Blocksberg, a German audio drama for children about a witch, refers to an alternate name for the Brocken (Blocksberg).
- The Brocken is mentioned in the novel Bald Mountain by Sergej Golovachov.
- The Brocken is mentioned in episode 546 of the TV anime series Detective Conan.
- There are two German fictional characters in the anime/manga Kinnikuman who are called Brockenman and Brocken Jr.
- There is a German black metal band named Brocken Moon.
- Brocken spectres is the topic of Polish poetic folk band "Na Bani" titled "Brocken" from the album "20 lat z górą".
- German heavy metal band Edguy mentions Brocken and Walpurgisnacht in their song "Angel Rebellion" from the album Kingdom of Madness.
- Caleb Carr published "The Legend of Broken" in 2012. The fictional kingdom of Broken occupies the Harz Mountains, and in particular Brocken, which for centuries had been considered the seat of supernatural doings, because, Carr demonstrates, of the ignorance and superstition of humans.

== See also ==
- List of the highest points of the German states
- Brocken spectre
- Lysa Hora (folklore) ("Bald Mountain")
