= Heinrichshöhe =

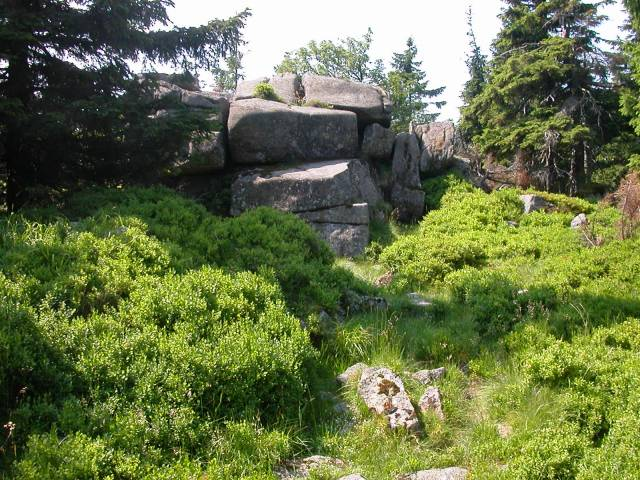
- The Brockentor on the Heinrichshöhe

Highest point
- Elevation: 1,040 m above sea level (NN) (3,410 ft)
- Prominence: 12 m → Brocken
- Isolation: 0.45 km → Brocken
- Coordinates: 51°47′22″N 10°37′45″E

Geography
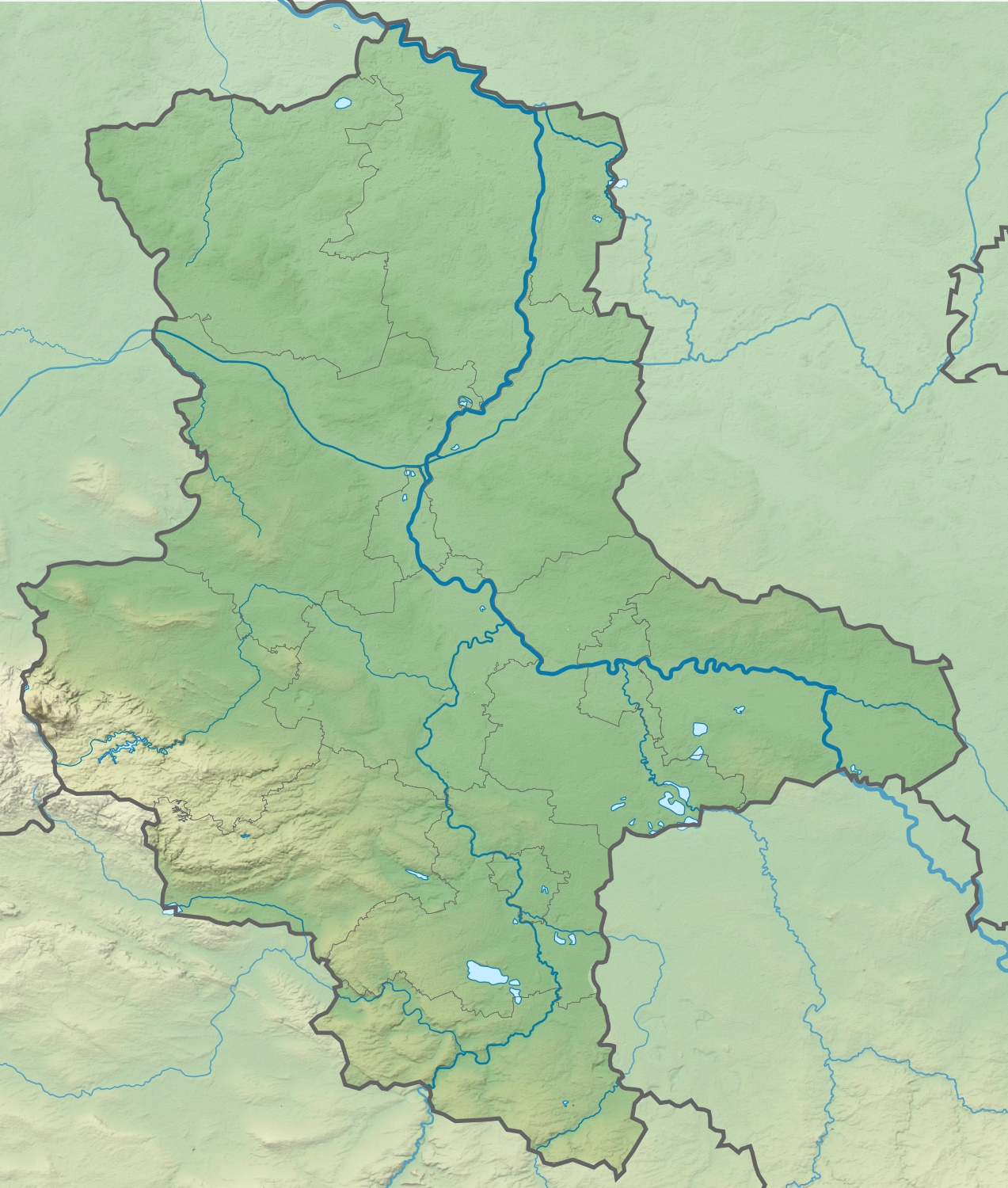
- Location within Saxony-Anhalt
- Location: Saxony-Anhalt, Germany
- Parent range: Harz Mountains

Geology
- Mountain type: Granite

Climbing
- Access: 1744: Peat works established near summit

The Heinrichshöhe is a subsidiary peak of the highest mountain in the Harz, the Brocken, and, at 1,040 m above NN, it is the second summit in the Harz Mountains.

Today, it may only be visited with permission from the national park authority for the purposes of research or controlling the wildlife population.

== Location ==
The Heinrichshöhe lies in the Harz National Park about 3.2 kilometres north-northwest of the village of Schierke in the southwestern part of the borough of Wernigerode. The summit rises about 1.4 kilometres southeast of the top of the Brocken and at least 205 metres northeast of near the Brocken Road (Brockenstraße or Brockenchaussee, K 1356) between Eckernlochstieg and Urwaldstieg. Near the summit on its southern flank is the tor of Brockentor ("Brocken Gate", 1,039.5 m).

== History ==
The mountain was named after Count Henry Ernest (Heinrich Ernst) of Stolberg-Wernigerode, who had a peatworks established on the Heinrichshöhe in 1747. The buildings of the peatworks, including visitors’ accommodation, burnt down in 1799.

The Heinrichshöhe Way (German: Heinrichshöhenweg) is the oldest documented track to the Brocken. It was first mentioned in the records in 1591 and ran roughly parallel to the present day Brocken Road. From the top of the Heinrichshöhe it runs straight to the summit of the Brocken. In the First World War a Ski monument (Skidenkmal) was built alongside the track, not far from the Brockenteich. It is number 19 in the Harzer Wandernadel hiking system.

At the highest point of the mountain there is a roughly 5 m high granite tor. In 1936 an inscription was carved in the rock by the Brockenschutz ("Brocken Guard").

The name Brockentor stems from the 18th century when the first Brocken inn was built immediately next to the tor.

The Heinrichshöhe was a popular destination in the Harz until the 1960s. After the wall was built it ended up in the out-of-bounds area. Following the reunification of Germany the Heinrichshöhe Way was closed.

== Gallery ==
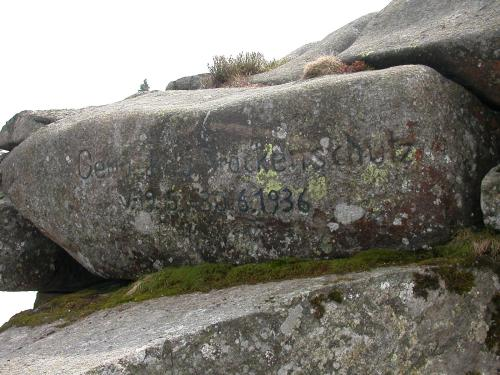
Inscription on the Brockentor

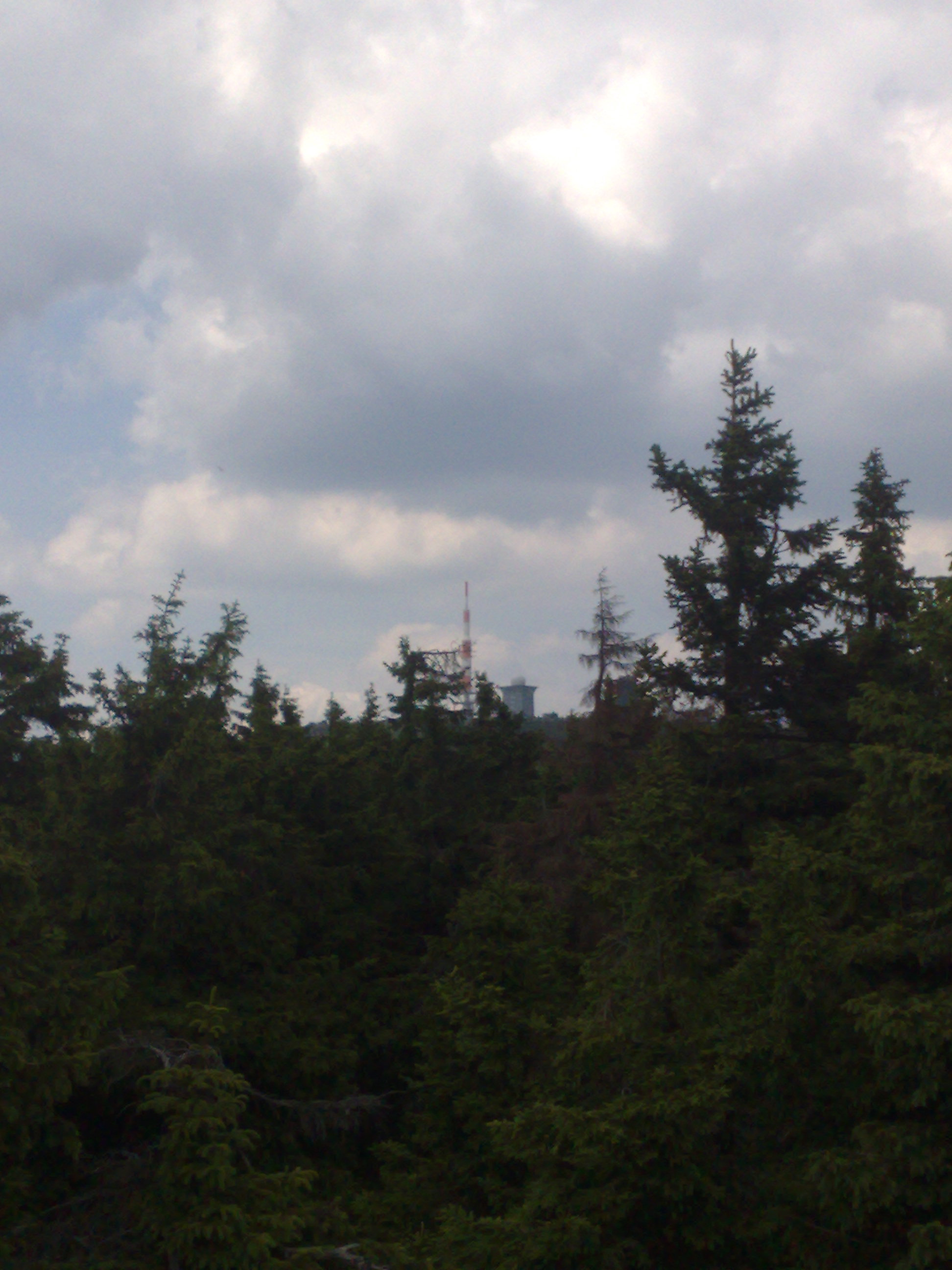
The Brocken as seen from the Heinrichshöhe (2008).

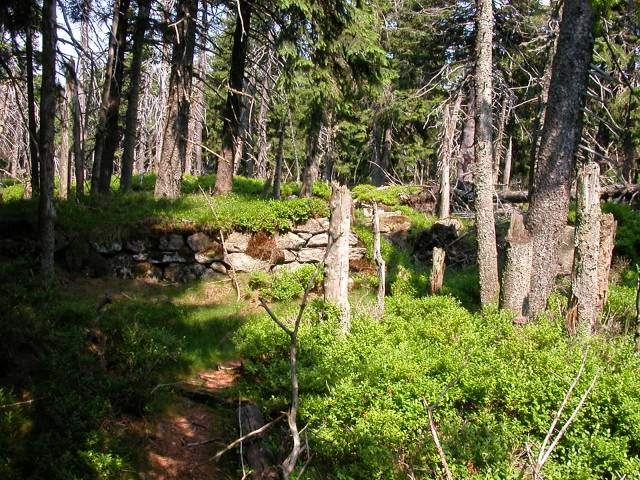
Ruins of the peat huts

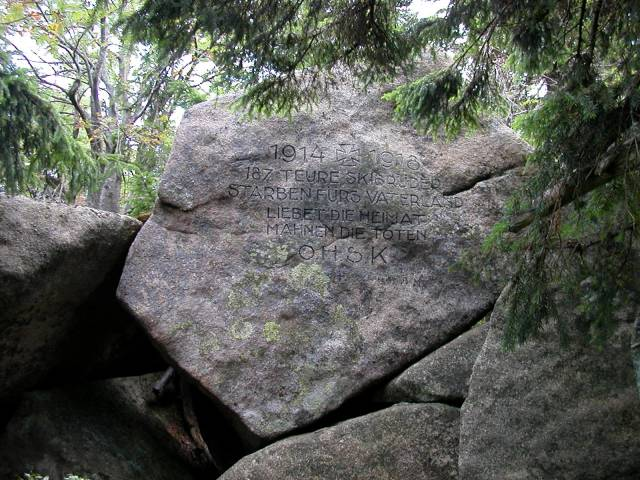
Ski monument (Skidenkmal) 600 m northwest of the Heinrichshöhe

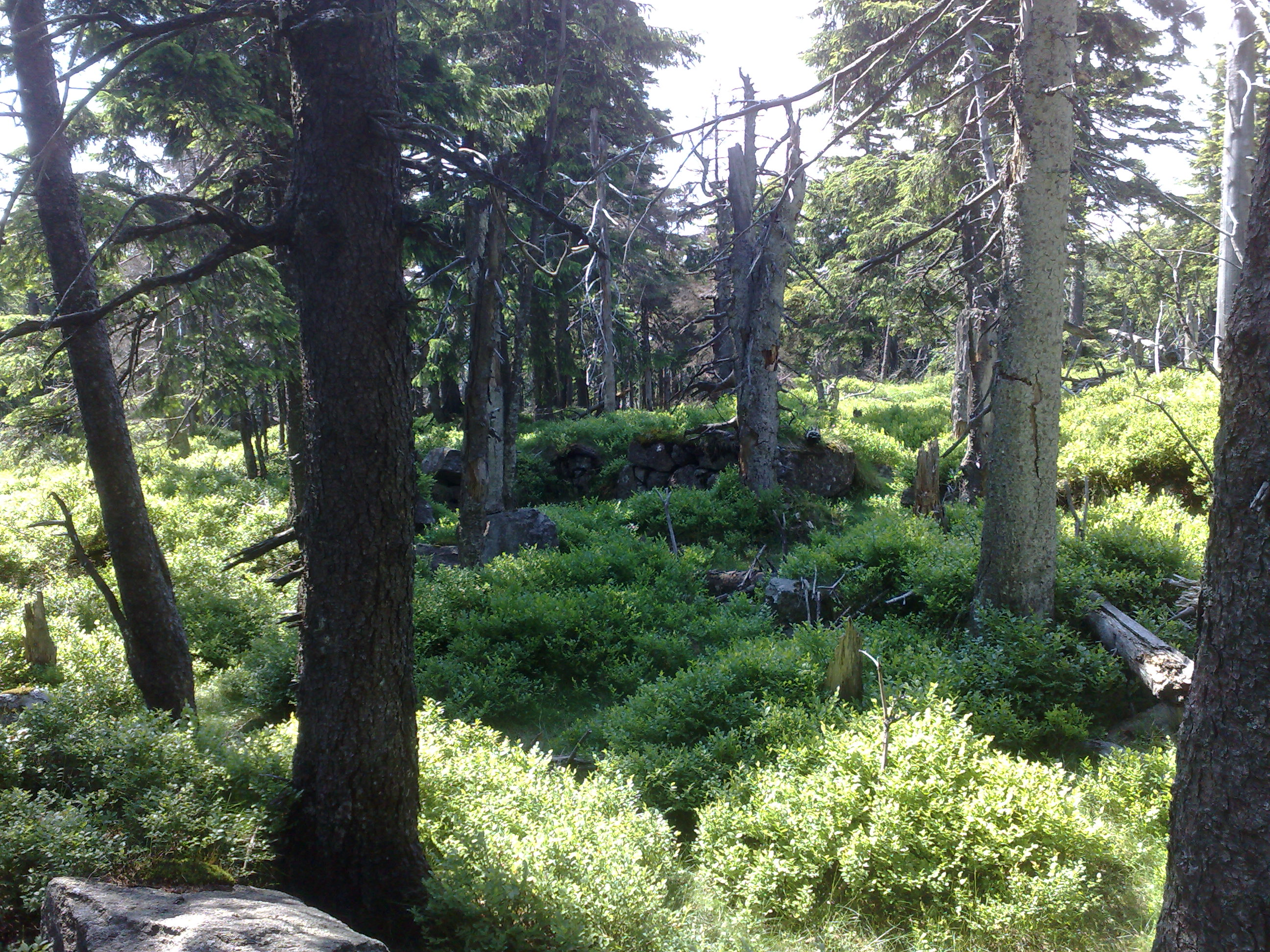
Ruins of the peat huts

== See also ==
- List of rock formations in the Harz
