= Brocken Pond =

Coordinates: 51°48′02″N 10°37′02″E

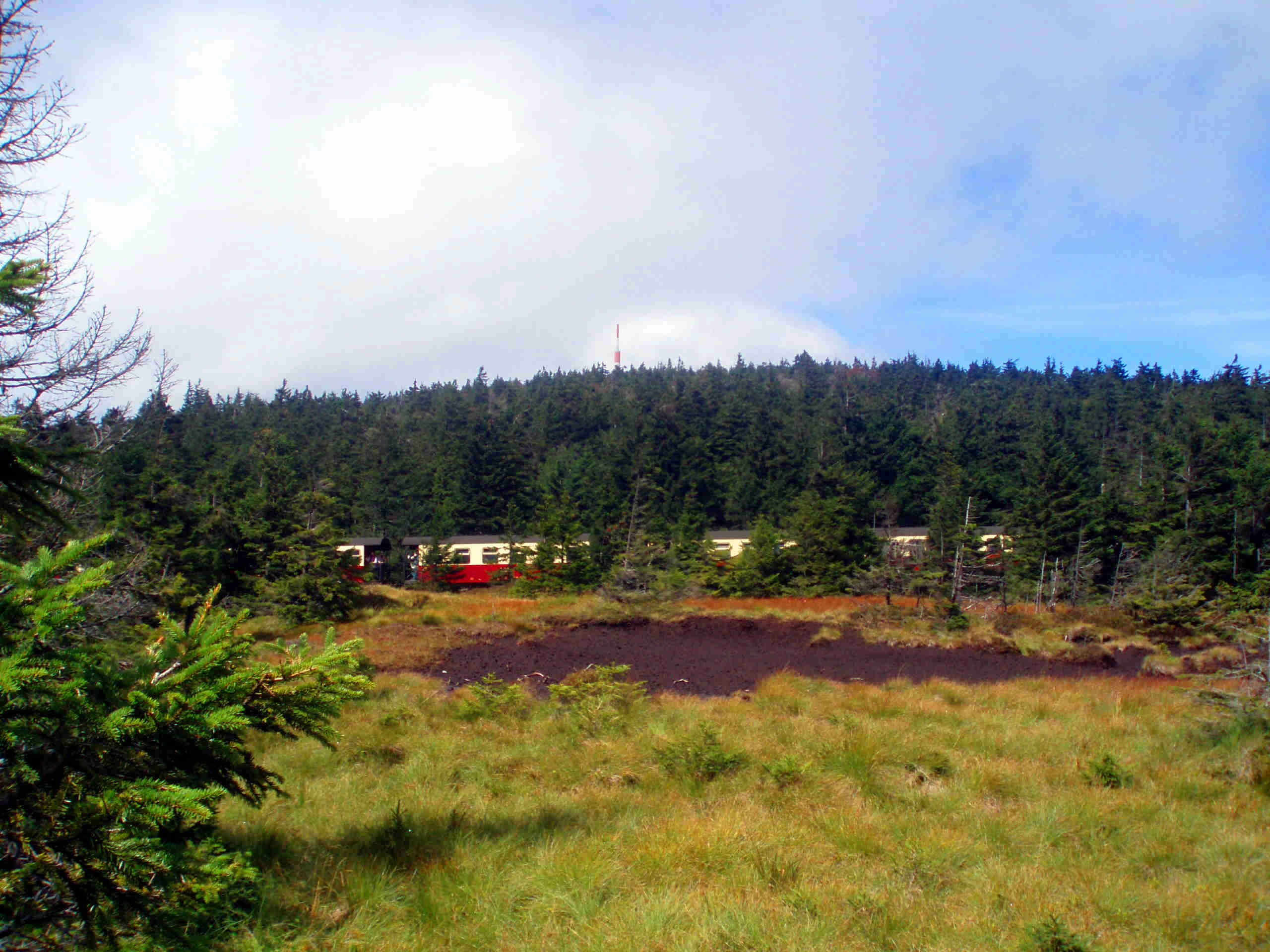
View of the Brocken over the site of the old Brocken Pond

The Brocken Pond (German: Brockenteich) is the name of a waterbody that was created in 1744 in the County of Wernigerode below the summit of the Brocken, the highest mountain in the Harz mountains of Germany. It is located in the present-day district of Harz.

In a letter dated 12 August 1744 and written at the Brocken by Count Henry Ernest of Stolberg-Wernigerode to his father, Christian Ernest in Wernigerode, he reports amongst other things: that yesterday evening, about 1½ hours from the famous Brocken Pond, we even made a start on staking out some peat houses ... so that they can be timbered this autumn, started up in the winter [and in the spring ...] can be sorted out. Today we will continue staking them out, including two stone houses, specifically for the purpose of the workers.
