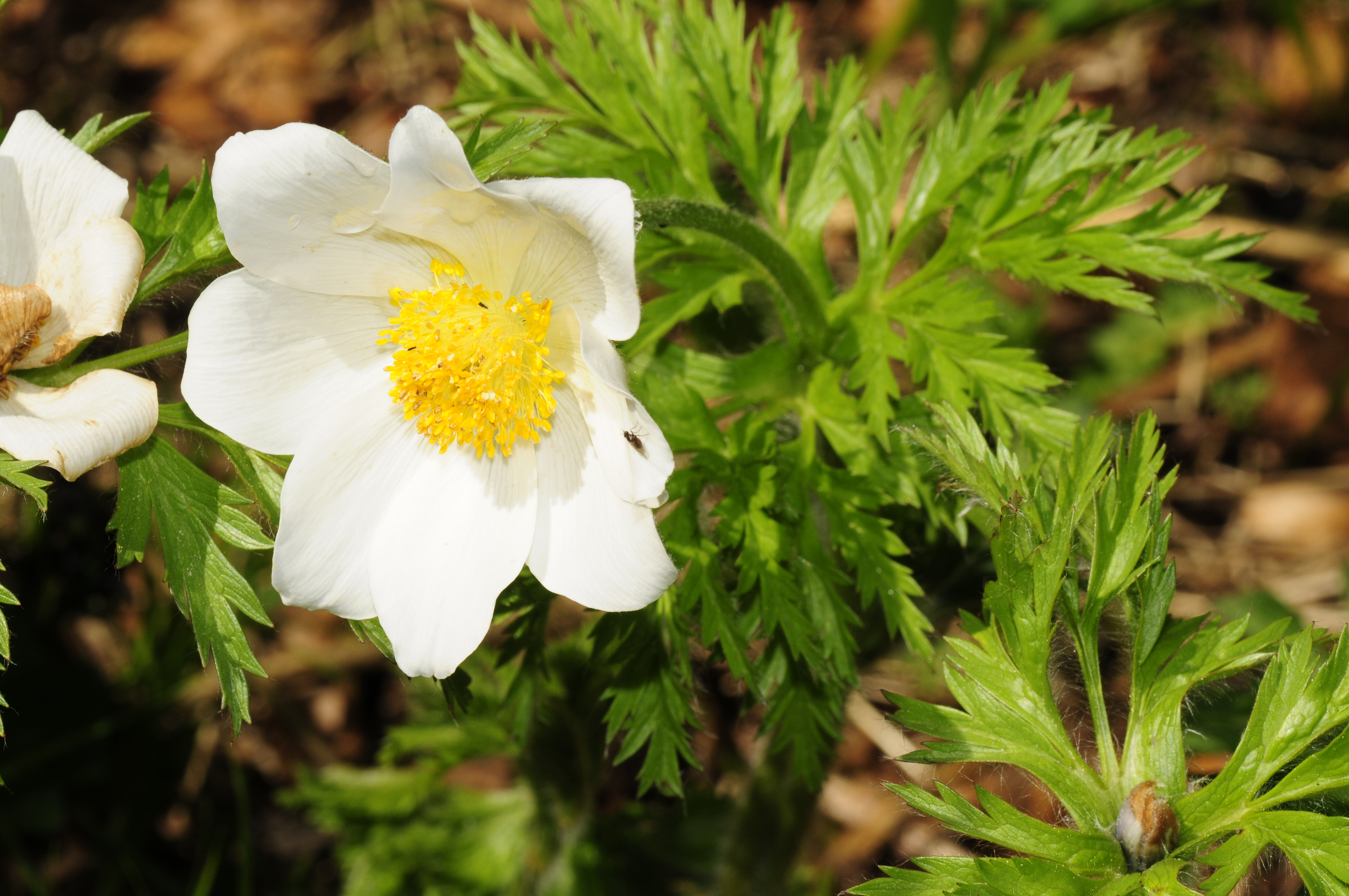
- Pulsatilla alpina subsp. alpina
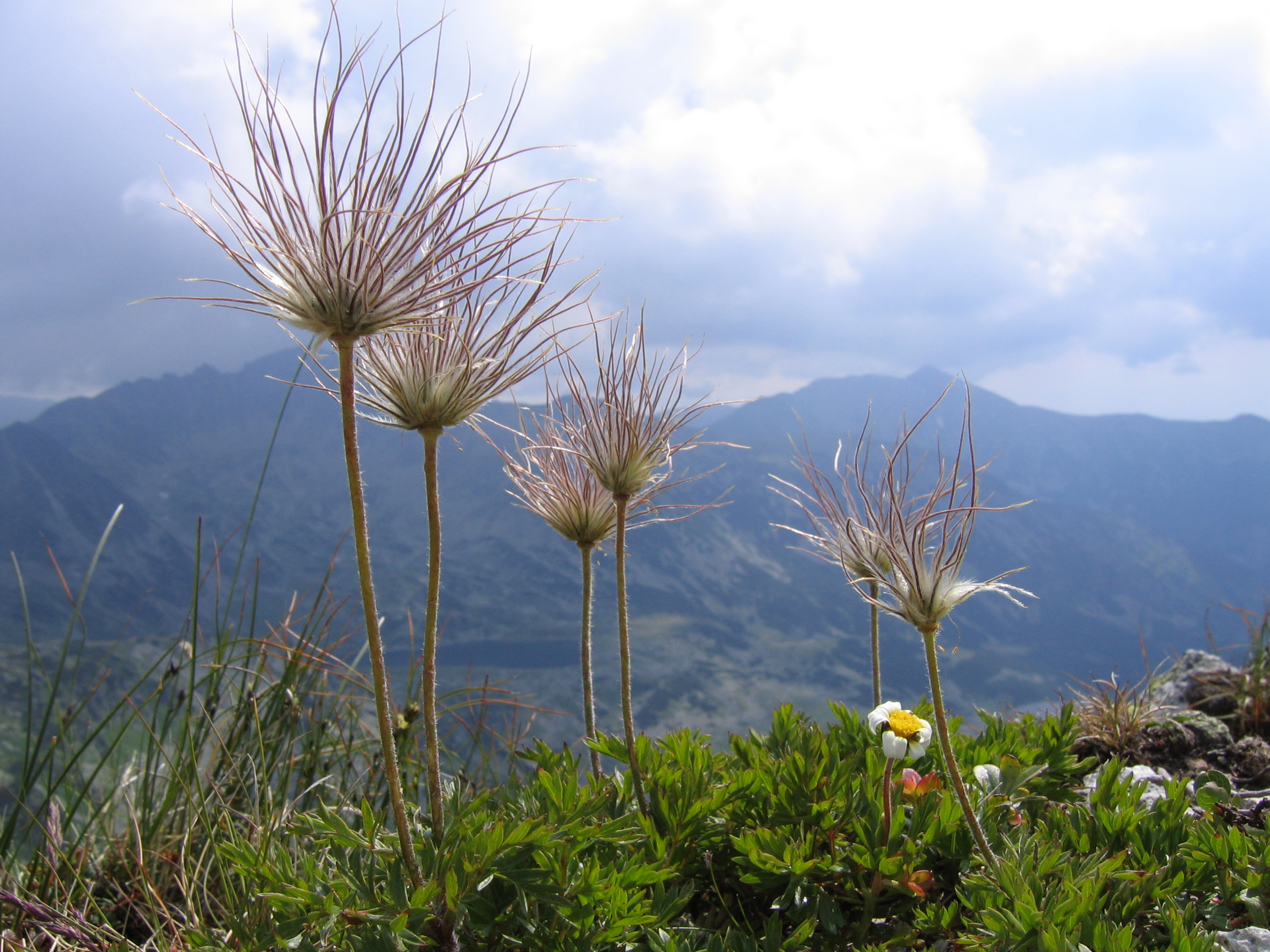
- Fruiting plants of P. alpina subsp. alba

Scientific classification
- Kingdom: Plantae
- Clade: Tracheophytes
- Clade: Angiosperms
- Clade: Eudicots
- Order: Ranunculales
- Family: Ranunculaceae
- Genus: Pulsatilla
- Species: P. alpina

Binomial name
- Pulsatilla alpina (L.) Delarbre

Subspecies
- P. a. subsp. alba; P. a. subsp. alpina; P. a. subsp. apiifolia; P. a. subsp. austroalpina; P. a. subsp. cantabrica; P. a. subsp. cyrnea; P. a. subsp. schneebergensis

= Pulsatilla alpina =

Species of flowering plant

Pulsatilla alpina, the alpine pasqueflower or alpine anemone, is a species of flowering plant in the family Ranunculaceae, native to the mountain ranges of central and southern Europe, from central Spain to Croatia. It is an herbaceous perennial growing to 15–30 cm (6–12 in) tall by 20 cm (8 in) wide, and can be found at altitudes of 1,200–2,700 m (3,900–8,900 ft).

== Characteristics ==
Pulsatilla alpina has deeply divided, hairy leaves. It has more upright flowers than other species of Pulsatilla, which generally have drooping flowers. They are white or, in the case of subsp. apiifolia, yellow. The flowers are produced very early, often opening while still under snow cover. They have prominent yellow stamens. As with all pasqueflowers, the flowers have a silky, hairy texture, and are followed by prominent seedheads which persist on the plant for many weeks.

== Subspecies ==
A number of subspecies are recognised, based largely on the form and hairiness of the leaves. P. alpina subsp. schneebergensis is endemic to the easternmost Alps of Austria, and is named after the Schneeberg mountain. It is replaced further west by the widespread taxon P. alpina subsp. alpina. P. alpina subsp. austroalpina is found in the Southern Alps from Switzerland eastwards, most commonly over dolomite. P. alpina subsp. apiifolia and P. alpina subsp. alba grow over siliceous rock, but are easily distinguished by the flower colour. Further subspecies have been named for local variants in the Cantabrian Mountains (subsp. cantabrica) and Corsica (subsp. cyrnea).

== Cultivation ==
Pulsatilla alpina is suitable for cultivation in an alpine garden, or in any sharply drained soil in full sun. It is extremely hardy but dislikes winter wet. The subspecies P. alpina subsp. apiifolia has gained the Royal Horticultural Society's Award of Garden Merit.
