= Ilza (name) =

Name list

Ilza is a given name, usually feminine. It is pronounced like Ilze or Ilse, and can be considered a variation on that name, which is in turn derived from Elizabeth. "She was christened Ilse, but she has changed it to Ilza to make it easier for the world at large to pronounce", reported one newspaper profile of a musician in 1928.

== People ==
- Ilza Amado Vaz, São Toméan politician, judge
- Ilza Niemack (1903–1993), American violinist, composer
- Ilza Nogueira (born 1948), Brazilian musicologist, composer
- Ilza Sternicka-Niekrasz (1898–1932), Polish pianist, composer
- Ilza Veith (1912–2013), German-born American historian of medicine

== See also ==
- Ilse
- Ilze
- Ilsa (disambiguation)
- Elza (given name)
- Iłża
