= Ilse (disambiguation) =

Ilse is a Germanic feminine given name.

Ilse may also refer to:

== Rivers ==
- Ilse (Bega), a river of North Rhine-Westphalia, Germany, tributary of the Bega
- Ilse (Lahn), a river of North Rhine-Westphalia, Germany, tributary of the Lahn
- Ilse (Oker), a river of Lower Saxony and Saxony-Anhalt, Germany, flowing from the Harz mountains, tributary of the Oker
- Ilse (Weser), a river in Lower Saxony, Germany

== Other ==
- 249 Ilse, an asteroid named for the legendary German princess of the Harz Mountains
- Aechmea 'Ilse', a plant

== See also ==
- Else (disambiguation)
- ILSE (disambiguation)
- Ilze, a given name
