= Molkenhaus (Wernigerode) =

Historic house

The Molkenhaus is a historic house near Wernigerode, Harz, Germany, located on the Jägerkopf hill above the Steinerne Renne waterfall and the source region of the Holtemme river. The timber-framed building, which was built by order of the Senior Master Hunter (Oberjägermeister) of the counts of Stolberg, von Meseberg, at the beginning of the 18th century, belonged to the Ilsenburger Marienhof and was used for hunting purposes and the production of butter. Nowadays it is used by the Harz National Park.

== Molkenhausstern ==
About 550 m (1,800 ft) as the crow flies north-northwest of the Molkenhaus and a little southwest of the Hohe Wand on the municipal boundary of Wernigerode with Ilsenburg, lies the Molkenhausstern (733 m above NN; 51°48′27.6″N 10°39′28″E), a forest track and hiking trail junction. It may be reached on the Molkenhauschaussee track from the Molkenhaus and is no. 23 in the system of checkpoints on the Harzer Wandernadel. The checkpoint box is in a refuge hut by the junction. The follow trails meet here: the Forstmeister-Sietz-Weg, the Molkenhauschaussee, the Soldansweg and the Victor-von-Scheffel-Weg. Hiking destinations in the area are displayed on a fingerpost at the junction. They are (in alphabetical order): Drei Annen Hohne, Hohneklippen, Ilsefälle (the Ilse Falls), Ilsenburg, Ilsestein, Ilsetal, Plessenburg, Schierke, Steinerne Renne, Wernigerode and Wolfsklippen.
