= Ilsestein =

Prominent granite rock formation near Ilsenburg, Harz, Germany

Coordinates: 51°50′49.5″N 10°39′41″E

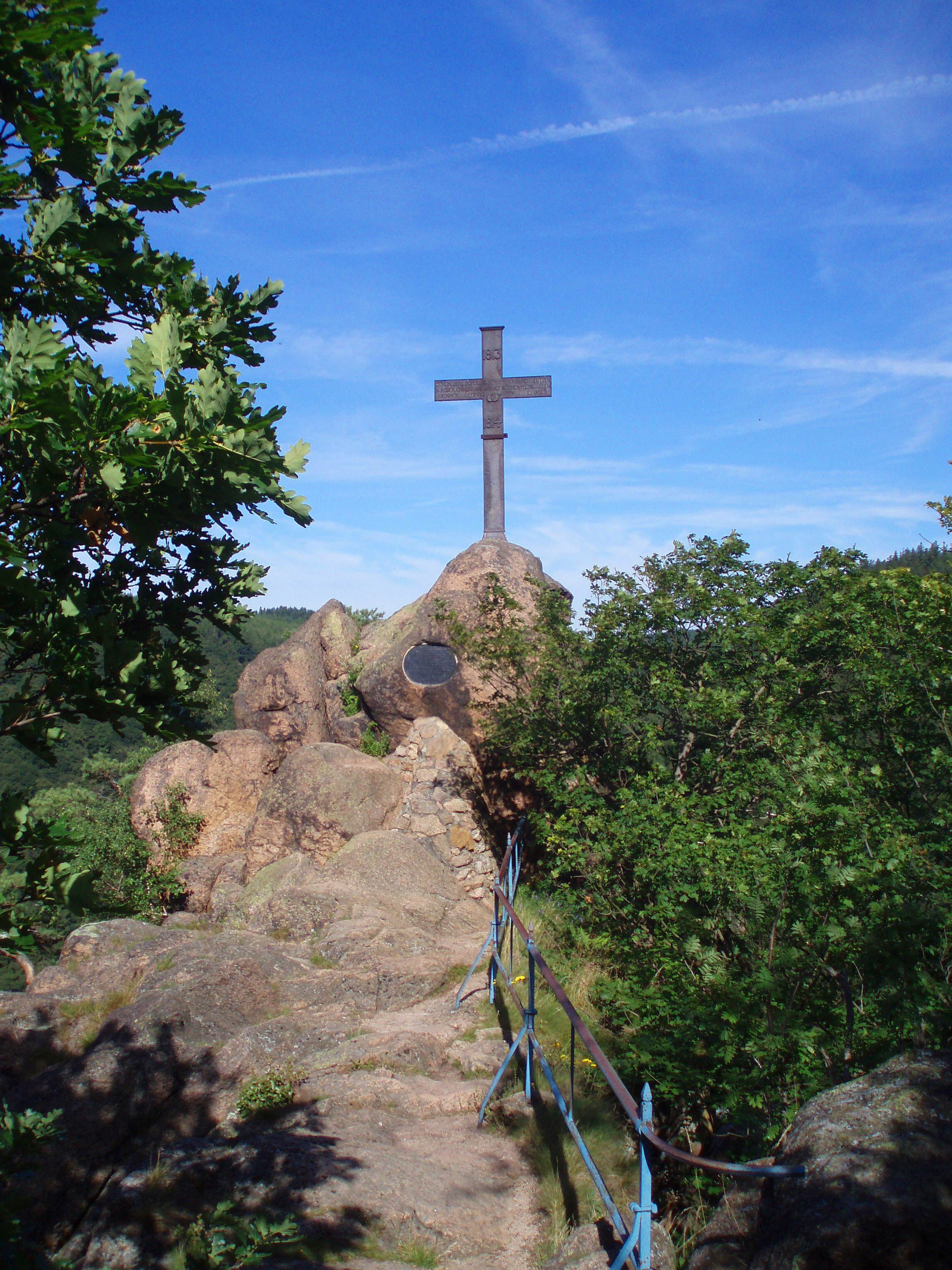
Iron cross and memorial plaque

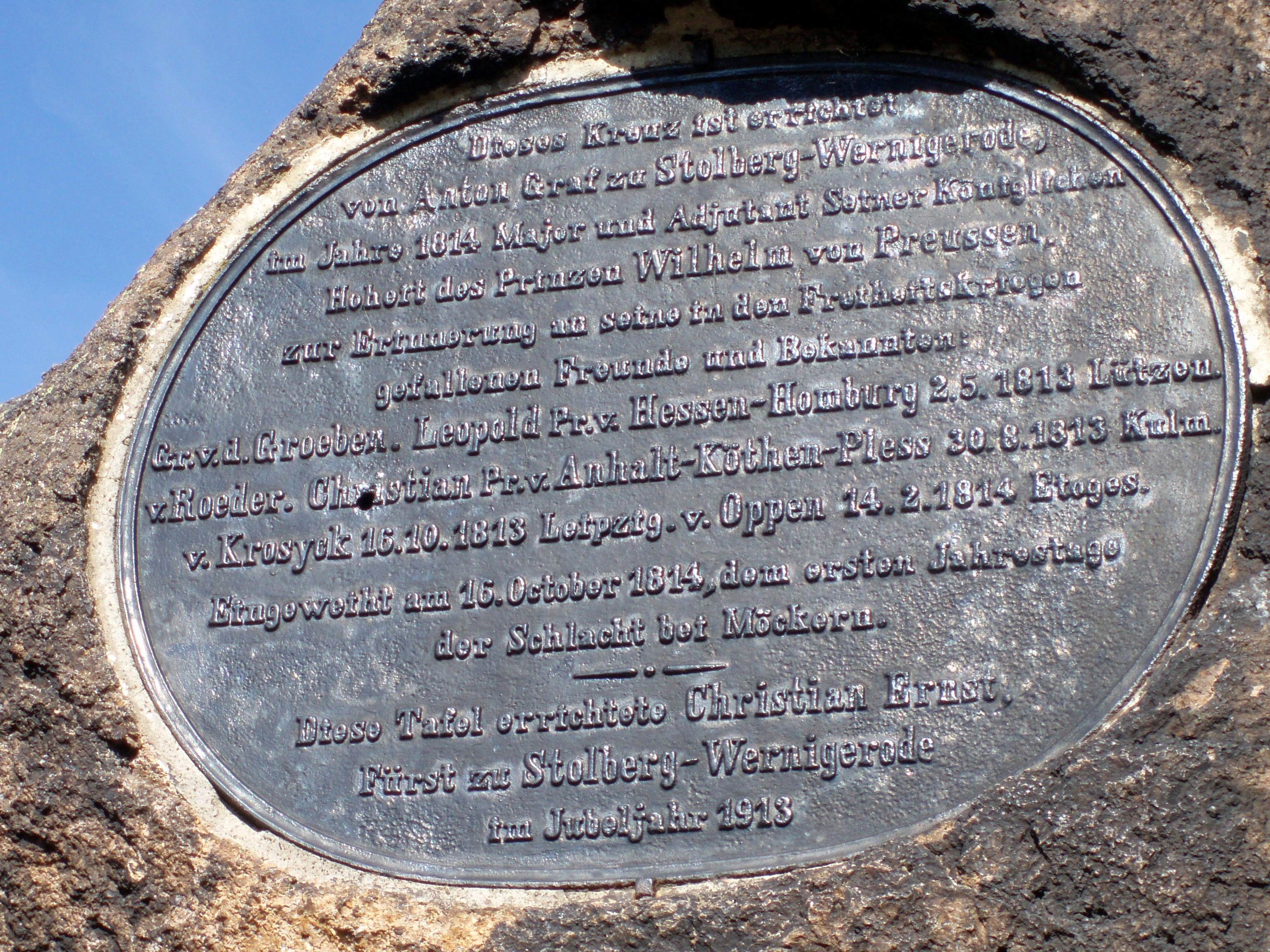
1913 memorial tablet

The Ilsestein (formerly also called Ilsenstein) is a prominent granite rock formation near the town of Ilsenburg in the Harz mountains of central Germany. Offering a scenic view over the Ilse valley to the Brocken massif, the highest mountain of the range, it is today a popular tourist destination.

== Geography ==
The Ilsestein is located in the Oberharz inside the Harz/Saxony-Anhalt Nature Park within the Harz National Park, the park boundary running along the forest track immediately east of the rock formation. Its summit is 473.2 m above sea level (NHN) and rises about 130 to 150 metres above the Ilse river. It is located about 2 km (1.2 mi) south-southwest of the centre of Ilsenburg. From toporgraphical maps it can be seen that there is a fork in the track to the northeast and just below the rocks at 315.5 m above NN and a waypoint on the same track next to the Gasthaus Ilsestein at 465.6 m above NN.

== History ==
Around 1000 AD, a small counter-castle was erected on the Ilsestein immediately after the conversion of the former Saxon fortress of Elysynaburg into Ilsenburg Abbey by the Bishops of Halberstadt. After about hundred years, it was destroyed around 1107, nevertheless its layout could be reconstructed.

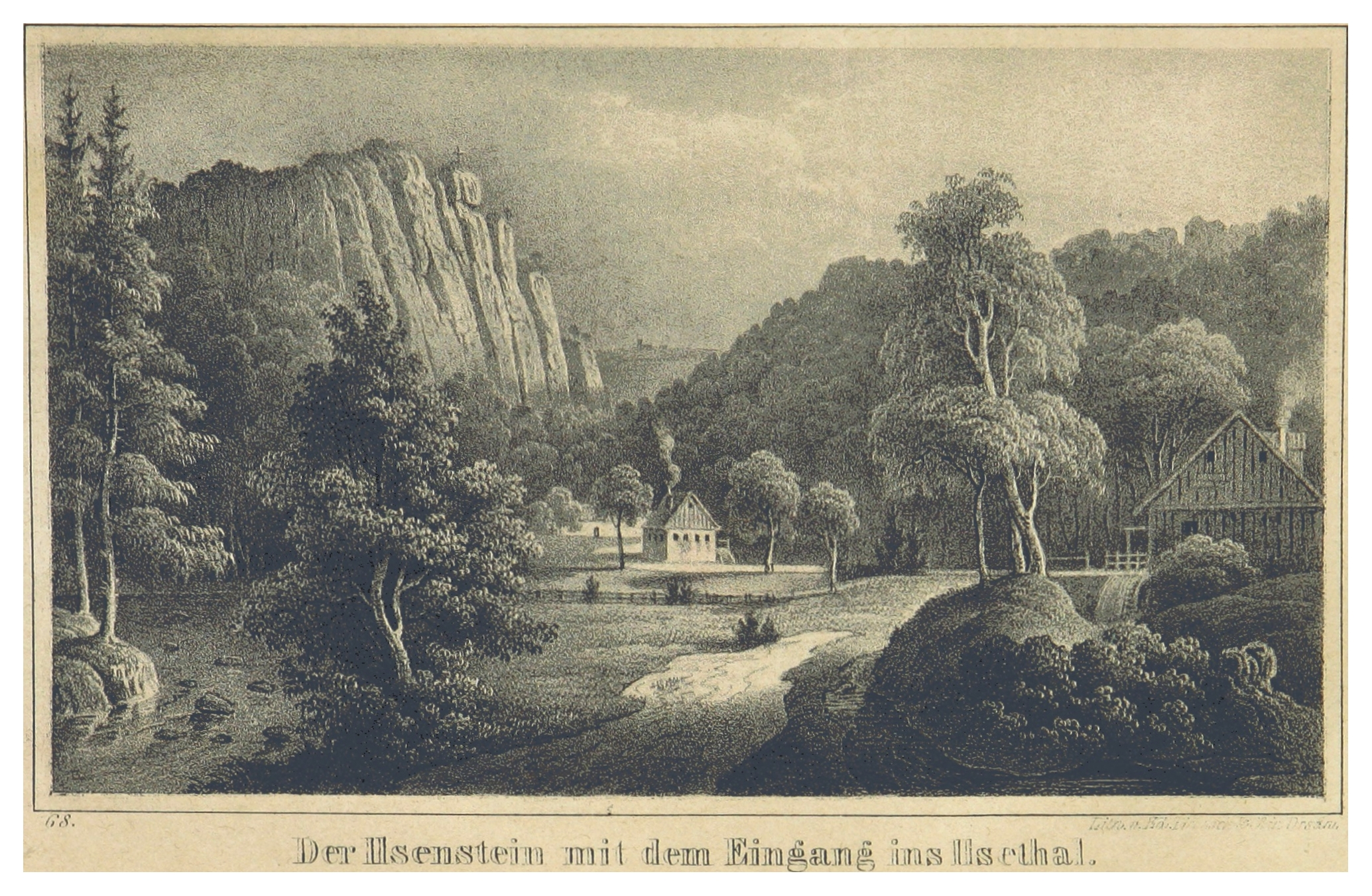
Ilsestein and Ilse valley, 19th century

Johann Wolfgang von Goethe mentions the Ilsestein in the Walpurgisnacht scene in his drama, Faust I, and again, together with the Heinrichshöhe and Schnarcherklippen, in Faust II. Heinrich Heine described how he climbed the Ilsestein in his 1826 book, Die Harzreise (The Harz Journey). Engelbert Humperdinck's opera Hansel and Gretel mentions an Ilsenstein as the location of a haunted forest. There are several legends around a maid Ilse and one Duke Henry, which authors like Heinrich Pröhle, Otto Roquette and others wrote down.

On 18 October 1814, one year after the Battle of Möckern on the first day of the Battle of Leipzig, Count Anton of Stolberg-Wernigerode (1785–1854) had an iron cross erected on the summit. The count had served as adjutant of Prince Wilhelm of Prussia and the monument commemorates his comrades who fell in the German campaign of the Napoleonic Wars. For the centenary of the Möckern battle, on 18 October 1913, a memorial plaque was unveiled here in the presence of Prince Christian Ernest of Stolberg-Wernigerode (1864–1940) with an explanation of the origin of the 1814 iron cross.

== Views and hiking ==
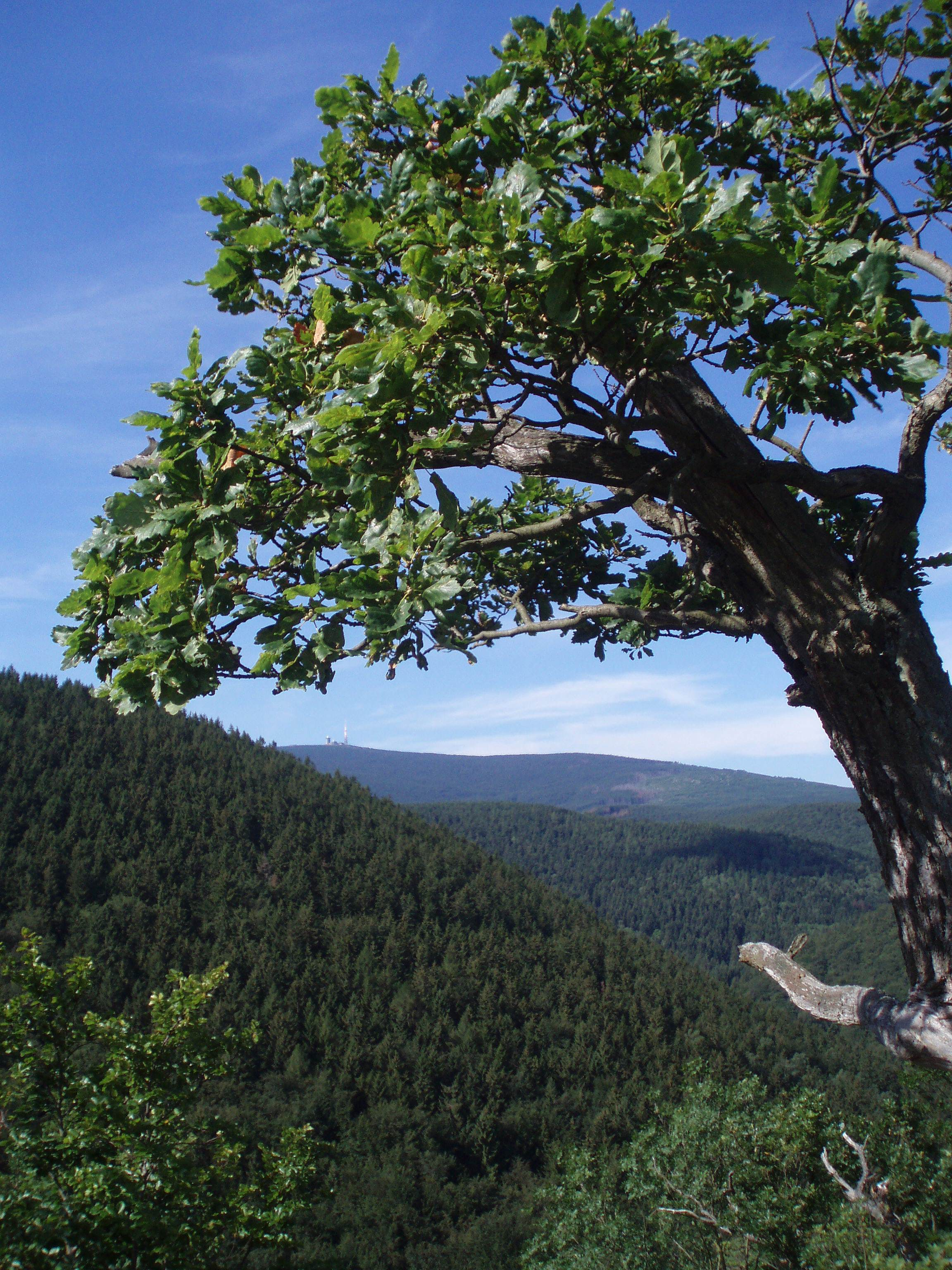
View of the Brocken from the Ilsestein

From the summit of the Ilsestein the view extends to the nearby Brocken, which rises to the southwest, into the Ilse valley with its surrounding mountains and to the north to Ilsenburg and the Harz Foreland.

The pub, Gasthaus Ilsestein, re-opened in 2016 and is checkpoint No. 30 in the Harzer Wandernadel hiking network.

== See also ==
- List of rock formations in the Harz
