= Zeterklippen =

Cliff in Harz, Germany

Coordinates: 51°48′33″N 10°38′27″E

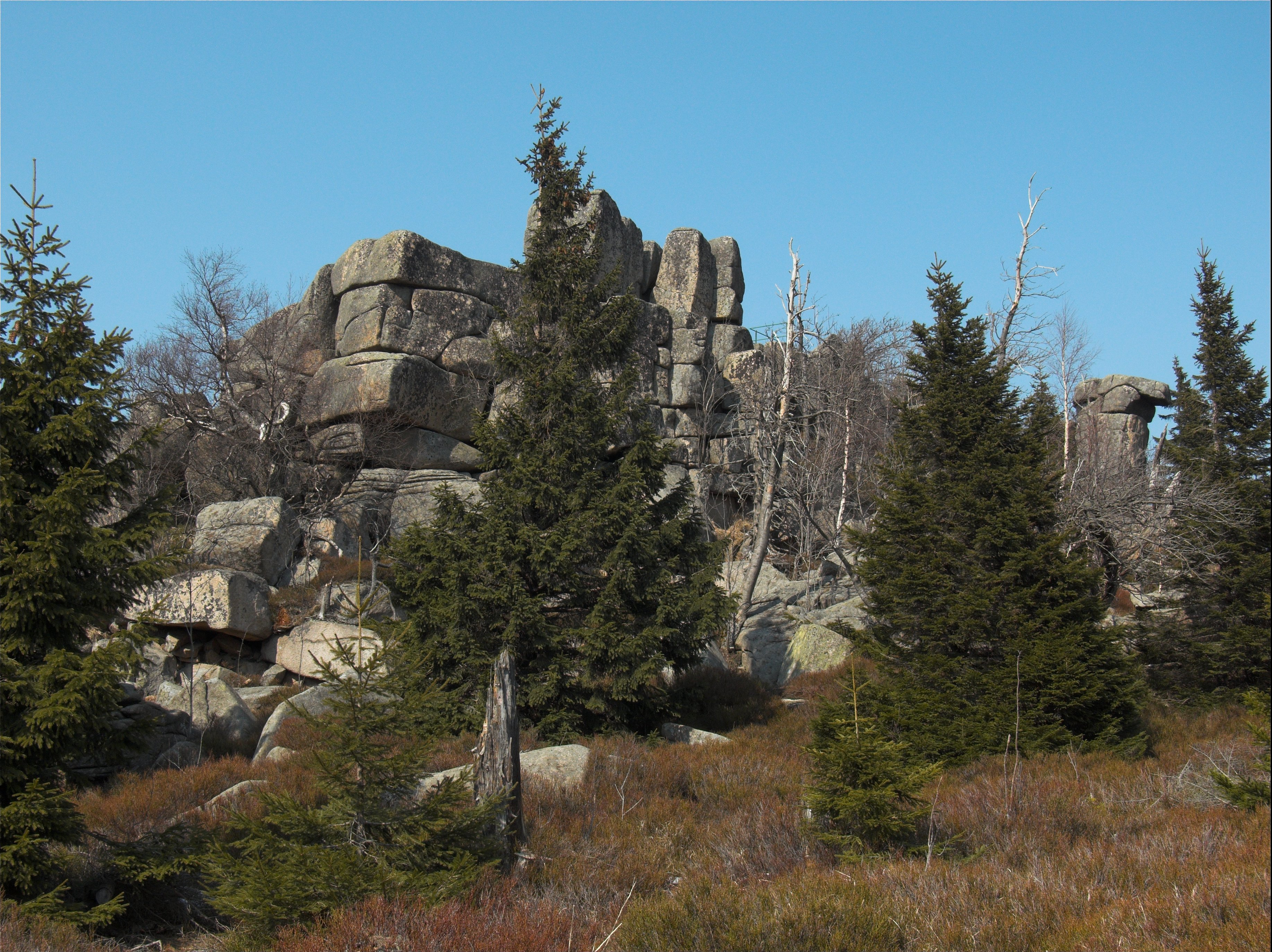
Eastern side of the Große Zeterklippen

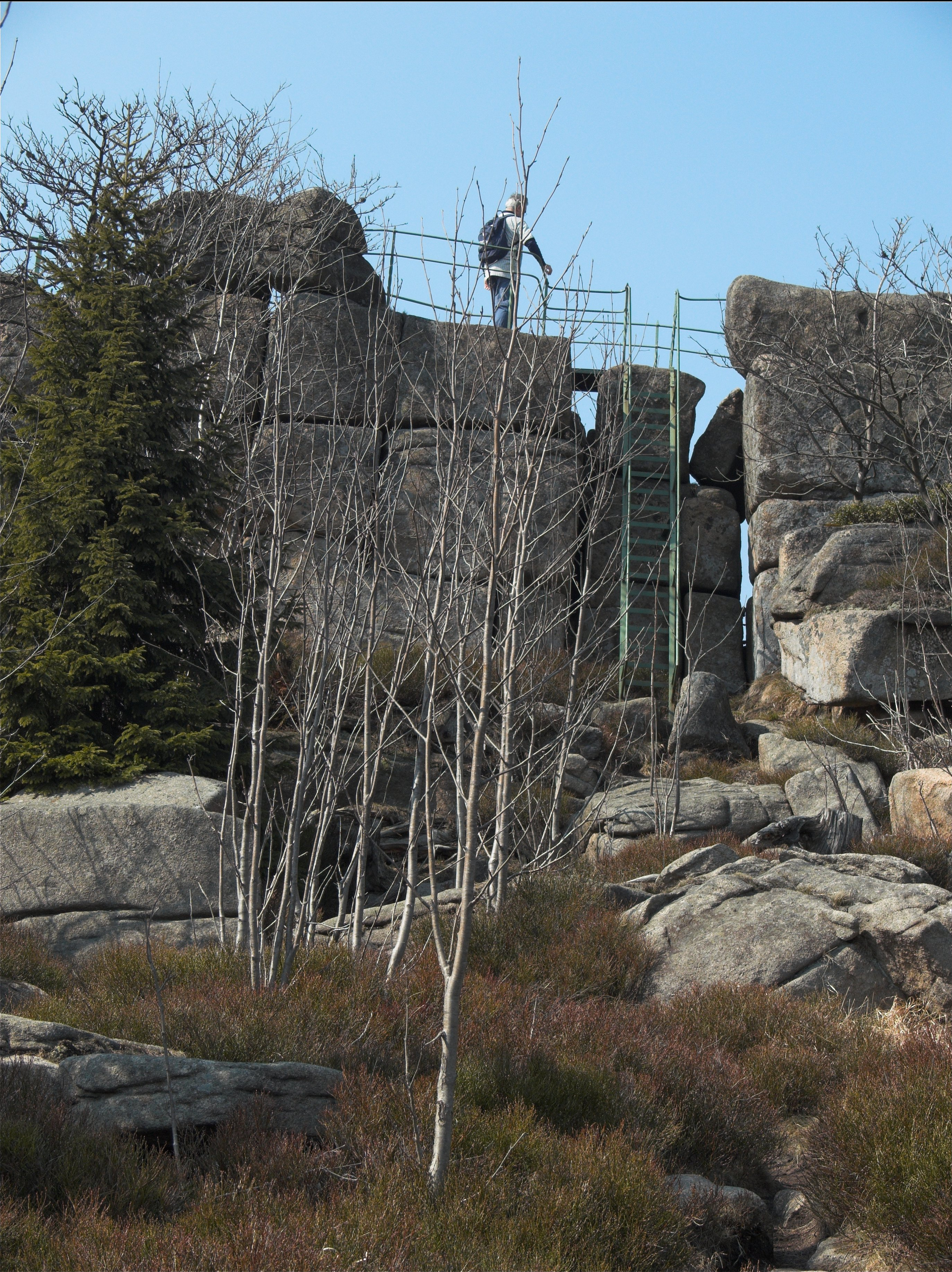
Climb to the Große Zeterklippen

The Zeterklippen are a striking rock formation or tor on the 930-metre-high Renneckenberg mountain, overlooking the Ilse valley in the Harz mountains in Germany. The Renneckenberg is an eastern sub-peak of the Brocken. The rocks themselves lie at a height of about 830 metres (2,720 ft) above sea level. They can be reached from the Molkenhausstern after about 2.5 km. The track initially runs uphill through dense spruce forest until the view opens out towards the Hohnekamm and down to Wernigerode. Then the route branches off to the right onto a steep, 0.5 km, path and, after about 200 m, a gentler 0.4 km path leads to the Große Zeterklippe ("Great Zeter Rock"). Immediately below this highest of the rocks is a mountain hut that dates to the time when a botanical garden had been laid out here as a replacement for the inaccessible Brockengarten.

The Große Zeterklippe can be climbed using iron ladders. The climb is rewarded with a wonderful view of the Brocken, the town of Wernigerode below and the North Harz Foreland.

== History ==
The origin of the name Zeterklippen is not entirely clear. It is not derived from Zeter or Zintar or Brunnen des Ziu ("Thor's Spring"). Also unlikely is the connexion with the Upper German word zêter which is a call for legal or military assistance.

In 1407 the name first appeared as de Zetterberg, in 1592 as am Zetterklebe and in 1640 as Setterklee.

The Große Zeterklippe ist checkpoint no. 10 in the Harz Walking Network (Harzer Wandernadel).

== See also ==
- List of rock formations in the Harz
