= Niemack =

Niemack is a surname. Notable people with the surname include:

- Horst Niemack (1909–1992), German general during World War II
- Ilza Niemack (1903–1993), American violinist, composer
- Judy Niemack (born 1954), American jazz vocalist
