= Molkenhaus =

The Molkenhaus may refer to:

- Molkenhaus (Bad Harzburg), a popular destination in the Harz Mountains of Germany near Bad Harzburg
- Molkenhaus (Wernigerode), a historic building near Wernigerode belonging to the Harz National Park Authority
- The first factory of Carl Friedrich Schinkel in Bärwinkel (Neuhardenberg)
