= Ilse =

Germanic feminine given name

- Pronunciation: German: [ˈɪlzə] Dutch: [ˈɪlsə]
- Gender: Feminine

Origin
- Region of origin: Austria, Belgium, Denmark, Finland, Germany, Netherlands, Norway, Sweden, and Switzerland

Other names
- Variant forms: Ilze, Ilsa
- Derived: Elisabeth

Ilse is a Germanic feminine given name. It is technically a German diminutive of Elisabeth, functioning as a given name in its own right chiefly in Austria, Belgium, Germany, the Netherlands, Switzerland, South Africa and all of the Scandinavian countries including Finland.

== People named Ilse ==
People with the given name Ilse include:

- Ilse Aichinger (1921–2016), Austrian writer
- Ilse Everlien Berardo (born 1955), German theologian
- Ilse Barea-Kulcsar (1902–1973), Austrian journalist, translator, writer and communist activist
- Ilse Bing (1899–1998), German photographer
- Ilse Braun (1909–1979), one of two sisters of Eva Braun
- Ilse DeLange (born 1977), Dutch singer
- Ilse Dörffeldt (1912–1992), German Olympic sprinter
- Ilse Fischer (born 1975), Austrian mathematician
- Ilse Fürstenberg (1907–1976), German actress
- Ilse Geldhof (born 1973), Belgian racing cyclist
- Ilse Gradwohl (born 1943), Mexican painter
- Ilse Hellman (1908–1998), Austrian-British psychoanalyst
- Ilse Heylen (born 1977), Belgian judoka
- Ilse Kaschube (born 1953), East German sprint canoer
- Ilse Koch (1906–1967), one of the first prominent Nazis to be tried by the U.S. military
- Ilse Kolkman (born 1997), Dutch rower
- Ilse Lotz-Dupont (1898–1968), German screenwriter
- Ilse Saris (born 1975), Dutch politician
- Ilse María Olivo Schweinfurth (born 1965), Venezuelan-Mexican singer and actress
- Ilse Thiele (1920–2010), East German politician
- Ilse Vaessen (born 1986), Dutch badminton player
- Ilse van der Meijden (born 1988), Dutch water polo player
- Ilse Werner (1921–2005), Dutch actress and singer

Fictional characters named Ilse include:

- Princess Ilse, a legendary princess of the Harz mountains in Germany
- Ilse Burnley, a major character in the Emily of New Moon trilogy and its adaptations.
- Ilse Langnar, a character from the Attack on Titan manga.
- Ilse Neumann, character in the play Spring Awakening, and later adaptations
- Ilse Witch, character in several books of the Shannara series
