= Princess Ilse =

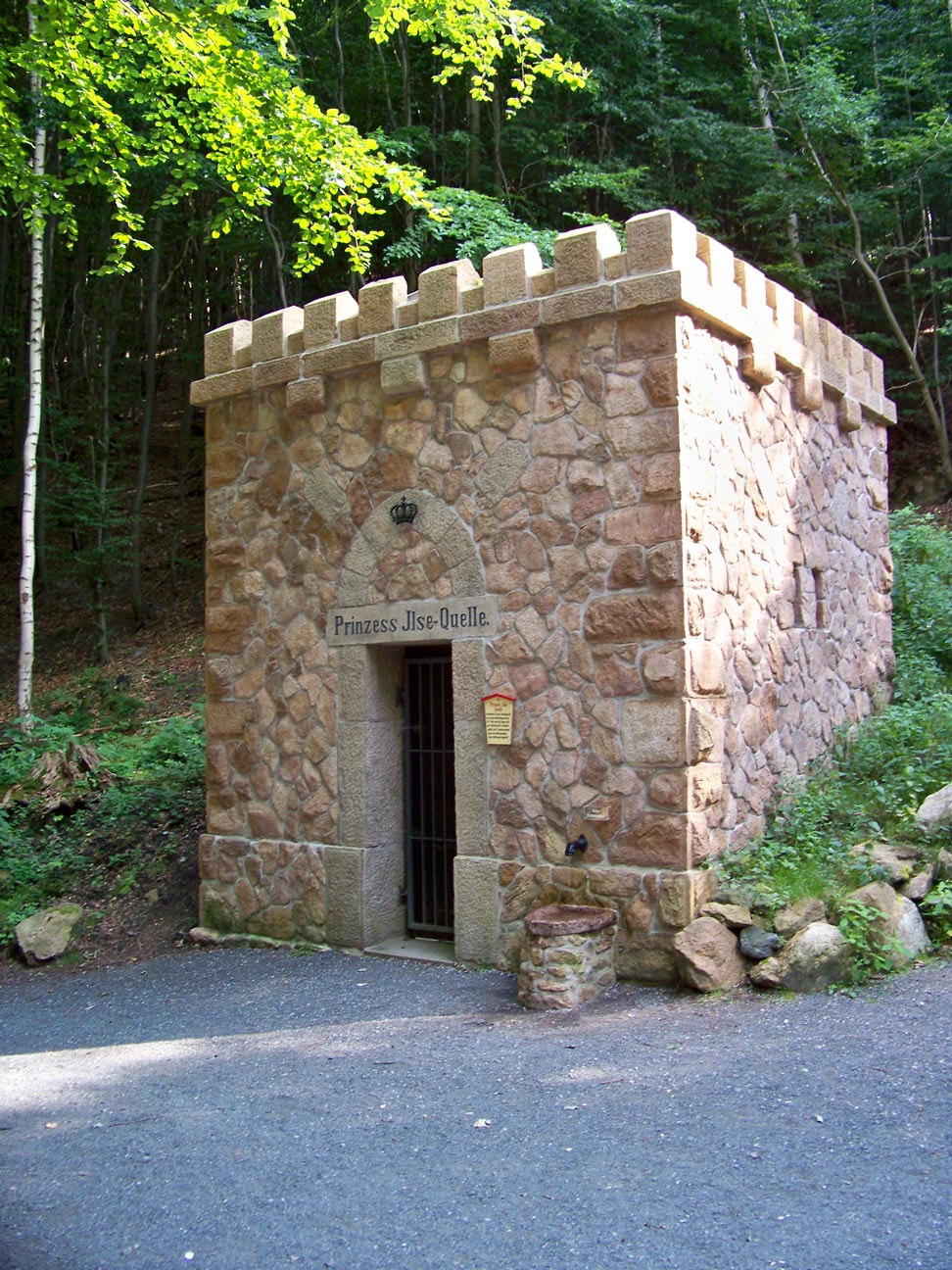
Prinzess Ilse spring

Princess Ilse (German: Prinzess Ilse or Prinzeß Ilse) is the name of a popular tourist destination in the Ilse valley near the town of Ilsenburg in the Harz Mountains of central Germany. The spot was named after the River Ilse, which rises on the highest mountain in the Harz, the legendary Brocken, and flows through the romantic Ilse valley to Ilsenburg.

== History ==
As early as 1871 a hotel appeared in the Ilse valley by the name of Princess Ilse, which enjoyed great popularity. The timber-framed building burned down in 1887, but was rebuilt and extended several times. In 1978 it was completely torn down.

Several hundred metres below the site of the old hotel there is still a spring, called Princess Ilse, from which a mineral spring flows.

Prinzeß Ilse is also the title of a romantic play in five acts from the days of the old Celle dukedom, which appeared in 1926 near Ströher in Celle and had been published by Karl Dassel and Karl Tolle.

== Legend ==
Prinzessin Ilse by contrast is the name of a fairy tale from the Harz by Marie Petersen, which first appeared in print in 1850. In this story, Princess Ilse loses her way whilst riding to the chase with her father, King Ilsing, and comes at nightfall to the gates of the fairy world, ruled by the fairy queen. The queen meets her kindly and invites her to the crystal palace.

The legend was further reflected in Heinrich Heine's Die Ilse.
