= Konrad Viktor Schneider =

German physician and anatomist (1614–1680)

Konrad Viktor Schneider (1614 in Bitterfeld – 10 August 1680 in Wittenberg) was a German physician and anatomist.

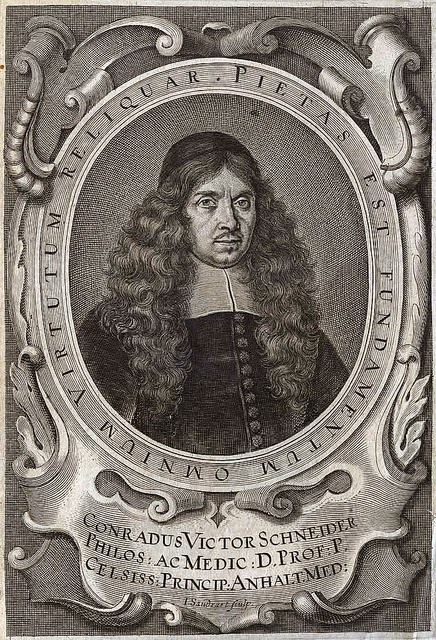
Konrad Viktor Schneider (1614–1680)

He studied at the University of Wittenberg, and in 1636 became a professor of medicine at the University of Jena. Two years later he returned to Wittenberg, where in June 1640 he was appointed professor of anatomy and botany.

In 1660–62 he published "De catarrhis", a multi-volume work in which he refuted the long-held belief that nasal mucus was a cerebral secretion. The eponym "Schneiderian membrane" is another name for the nasal mucosa.

== Selected works ==
- Liber de osse cribriformi, 1655.
- De catarrhis, 1660.
- De pleuripneumonia dissertatio medica (proponit Christoph Schrödter, 1662).
- Disputatio inauguralis medica de angina (respondent János Friedel, 1666).
- Disputatio medica de peste, morborum principe (respondent Johann Gerdes, 1680).

In 1873 Karl Friedrich Heinrich Marx published "Konrad Victor Schneider und die Katarrhe".
