= 249 Ilse =

Main-belt asteroid

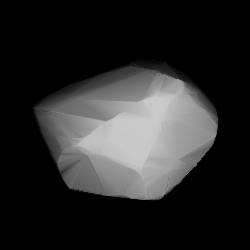
- 3D model based on lightcurve data

Discovery
- Discovered by: C. H. F. Peters
- Discovery date: 16 August 1885

Designations
- Pronunciation: German: [ˈɪlzə]
- Named after: Ilse
- Alternative designations: A885 QA, 1973 PB
- Minor planet category: Main belt

Orbital characteristics
- Epoch 31 July 2016 (JD 2457600.5)
- Uncertainty parameter 0
- Observation arc: 130.59 yr (47699 d)
- Aphelion: 2.89450 AU (433.011 Gm)
- Perihelion: 1.85992 AU (278.240 Gm)
- Semi-major axis: 2.37721 AU (355.626 Gm)
- Eccentricity: 0.21760
- Orbital period (sidereal): 3.67 yr (1338.8 d)
- Average orbital speed: 19.31 km/s
- Mean anomaly: 223.964°
- Mean motion: 0° 16^{m} 8.065^{s} / day
- Inclination: 9.61979°
- Longitude of ascending node: 334.727°
- Argument of perihelion: 42.3241°

Physical characteristics
- Dimensions: 34.83±1.1 km
- Synodic rotation period: 84.94 h (3.539 d)
- Geometric albedo: 0.0428±0.003
- Temperature: unknown
- Absolute magnitude (H): 11.33

249 Ilse is a Main belt asteroid. It has an unusually slow rotation period, about 3.5 days.

It was discovered by C. H. F. Peters on August 16, 1885, in Clinton, New York and was named after Ilse, a legendary German princess.

Due to the long rotation period, a possible asteroidal satellite of Ilse was proposed by R. P. Binzel in 1987 however no evidence of this has been found.
