= Kleine Renne =

Waterfall in Germany

Coordinates: 51°48′41″N 10°42′16″E

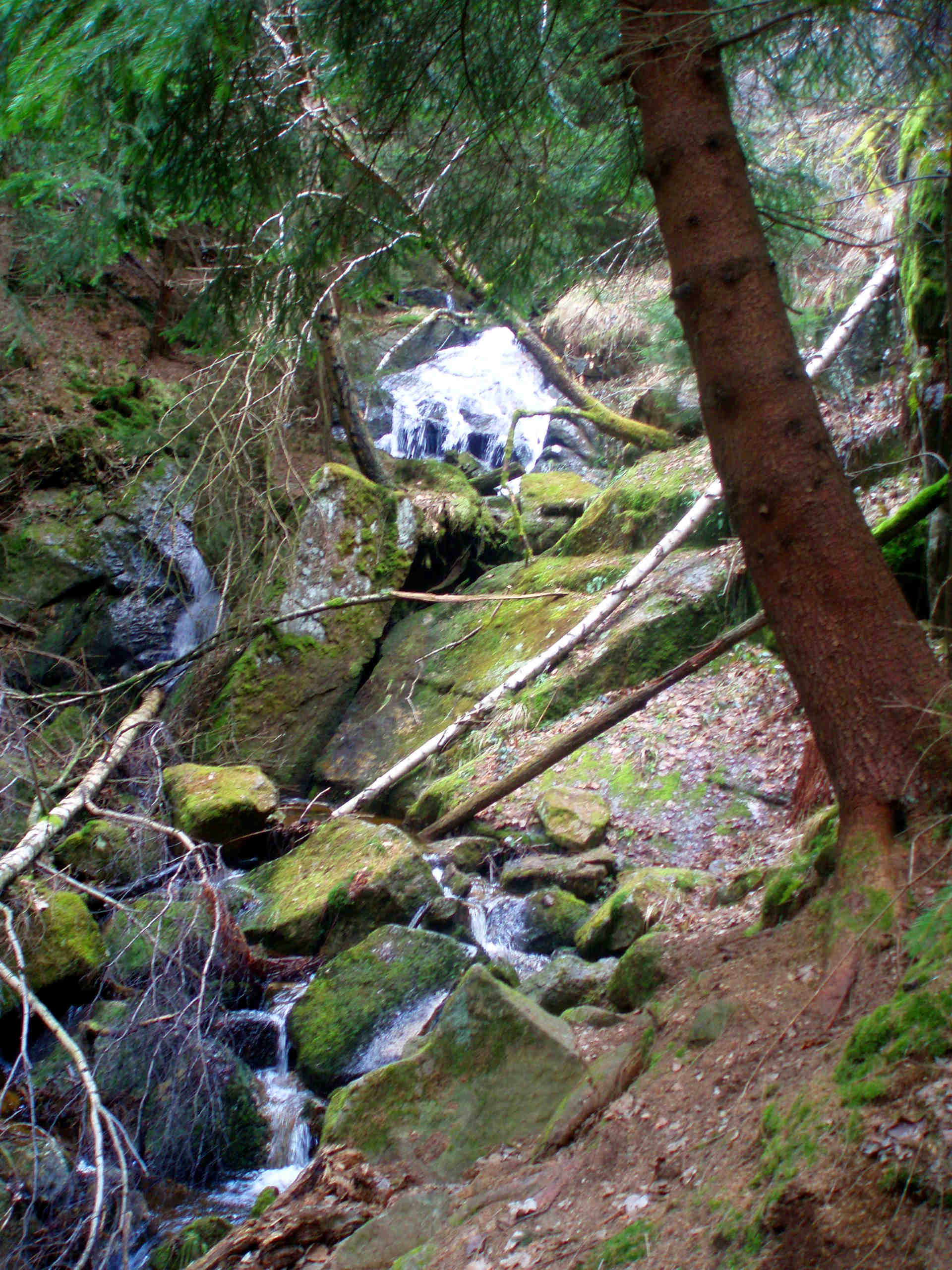
The Kleine Renne

The Kleine Renne is a cascading mountain stream and officially designated natural monument near the town of Wernigerode in the Harz Mountains of Germany.

== Location ==
The Kleine Renne is located west of the village of Hasserode in the borough of Wernigerode in a forest at the foot of the Brocken, the highest mountain in the Harz. It is a left tributary of the River Holtemme below the Steinerne Renne. The water flows here over countless little waterfalls over numerous boulders and granite rocks down to the valley of the Holtemme. A signed footpath, which was re-opened in the early 1990s, runs steeply uphill in the valley of the Kleine Renne and meets the old road at the forest in of Steinerne Renne.
