= Karl Friedrich Heinrich Marx =

German physician and college lecturer

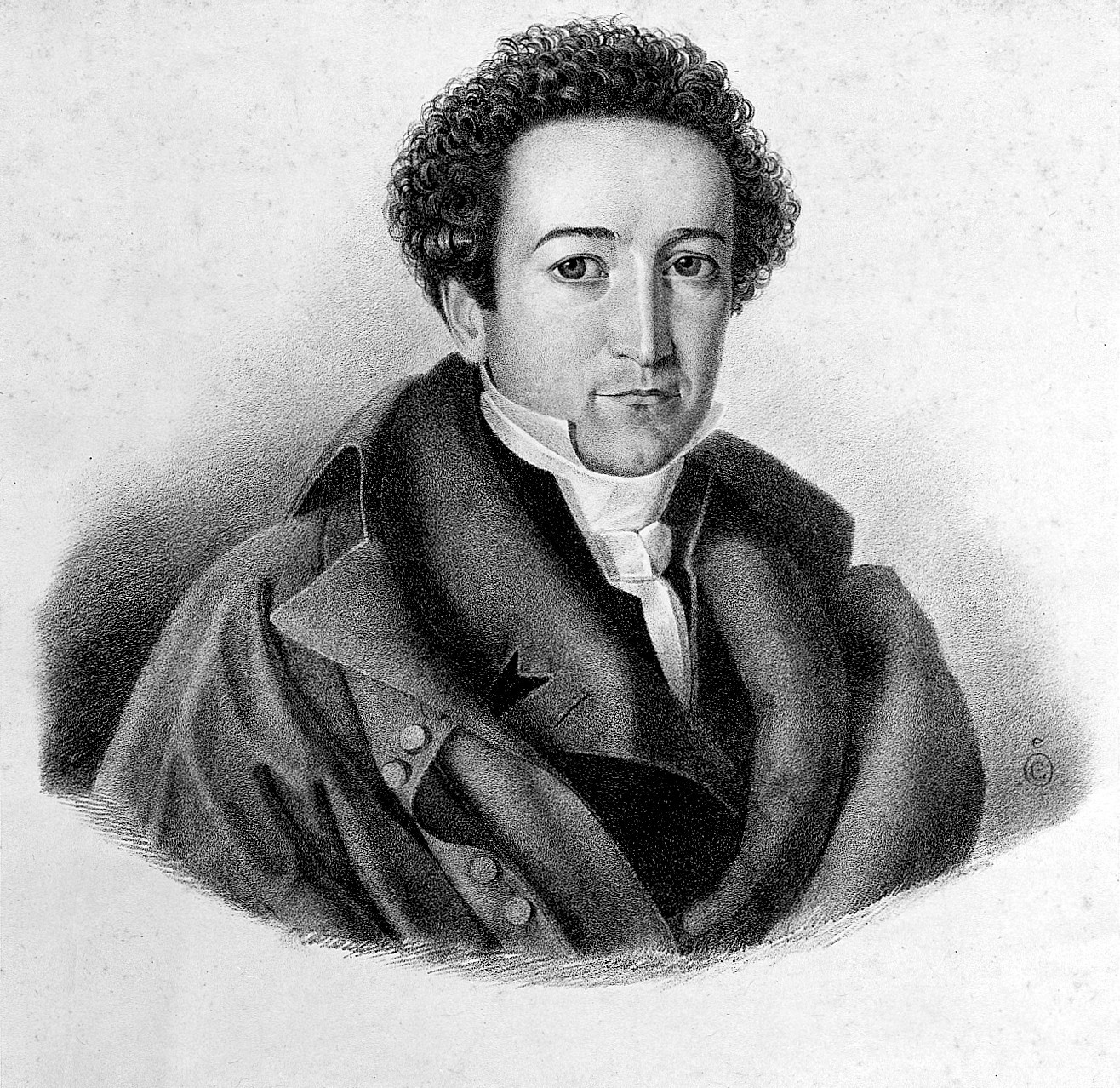
- Karl Friedrich Heinrich Marx
- Born: 10 March 1796; Duisburg, Holy Roman Empire
- Died: 2 October 1877 (aged 81)
- Occupations: physician and college lecturer

Karl Friedrich Heinrich Marx (10 March 1796 – 2 October 1877) was a German medical doctor and college lecturer.

== Life and works ==
Marx was born on 10 March 1796 in Karlsruhe, the son of a Jewish antiquarian, and attended the Karlsruhe Lyceum, where he was taught by Johann Peter Hebel and Karl Christian Gmelin. His brother was professor of natural philosophy at Brunswick.

In 1813 Karl began studies in philosophy and medicine in Heidelberg. Here, in 1817, he participated in the Old Heidelberg Burschenschaft as a friend of Heinrich Carl Alexander Pagenstecher. He had contacts with Jean Paul and attended inter alia lectures by Georg Wilhelm Friedrich Hegel, becoming a follower of his. In 1817 he completed his studies and, in 1818, passed his exams with distinction. For his work on the subject, Die Struktur und das Leben der Venen he was awarded a prize by the university. In 1818, he probably participated in the founding of the first Freiburg Burschenschaft, having been in Freiburg a member and mentor of Genossenschaft/Verein zur Bearbeitung wissenschaftlicher Gegenstände, from which the Freiburg Burschenschaft developed. When he then went to Vienna for further studies, he was a corresponding member of the Old Freiburg Burschenschaft. In Vienna he also got to know Karl Ludwig Sand through his burschenschaft connexions. In 1819, Sand murdered the poet, August von Kotzebue, Marx was in Vienna on 19 June 1819 for burschenschaft-related activities and was taken into custody for nine months and then released without charge. In 1820 he was awarded his doctorate in medicine in Jena. Thereafter he went to Göttingen, where he worked as an assessor at the Göttingen University Library, received his habilitation in 1822 at the Faculty of Medicine, became a professor extraordinarius in 1826 and a professor ordinarius in 1831. He taught there for the rest of his life, but also had a doctor's practice. In Göttingen he met Heinrich Heine, his discussions about medicine and his treatise, Goettingen in medicinischer, physischer und historischer Hinsicht are mentioned in his travel journal, Die Harzreise. Heine was also treated by Marx in Göttingen.

In 1831 he travelled in England and published "Recollections of England" (1841).

== Honours ==
- In 1838 he became a member of the Gesellschaft der Wissenschaften zu Göttingen

== Publications (selection) ==
- Goettingen in medicinischer, physischer und historischer Hinsicht. Göttingen, 1824.
- De euthanasia medica prolusio. Göttingen, 1826.
- Allgemeine Krankheitslehre. Göttingen, 1833.
- Zur Lehre von der Lähmung der untern Gliedmassen. Karlsruhe und Baden, 1838.
- Ueber Begriff und Bedeutung der schmerzlindernden Mittel. Göttingen, 1851.
- Ueber die Verdienste der Aerzte um das Verschwinden der dämonischen Krankheiten. Göttingen, 1859.
- Ueber die Beziehungen der darstellenden Kunst zur Heilkunst. Göttingen, 1861.
- Konrad Victor Schneider und die Katarrhe. Göttingen, 1873.

== Literature ==
- August Hirsch (1884). "Marx, Karl Friedrich Heinrich" . Allgemeine Deutsche Biographie (in German). Vol. 20. Leipzig: Duncker & Humblot. pp. 540–541.
- Markwart Michler (1990). "Marx, Karl, Mediziner". Neue Deutsche Biographie (in German). Vol. 16. Berlin: Duncker & Humblot. pp. 327–328. (full text online).
- Helge Dvorak: Biographisches Lexikon der Deutschen Burschenschaft. Band I, Teilband 4, Heidelberg 2000, pp. 40–41.
- Heinrich Schipperges: Gesundheit und Gesellschaft: ein historisch-kritisches Panorama. Berlin, 2003, pp. 80 ff.
