= Marie Petersen =

German author

Marie Luise Auguste Petersen (31 July 1816 – 30 June 1859) was a German writer. One of her works was the fairy tale Princess Ilse.

Petersen came from a well off family of pharmacists in Frankfurt (Oder). Her grandfather, the "university pharmacist" Friedrich Petersen had since 1780 worked at the apothecary "Zur Goldenen Kugel." His second son, Karl later took over the business, marrying Wilhelmine (née Dionysius), and Marie Petersen was the first child of this union.

Shortly after her birth, Petersen developed a chronically deformed spinal curvature, and orthopedic institutions in Berlin were unable to correct the condition. Upon the death of Petersen's mother in 1834, her father sold his pharmacy in order to devote himself to the care and upbringing of his children. He remarried, and his second wife, Amalie, transformed the household into one of the most musical in Frankfurt. Marie lived modestly and withdrawn and received a well-rounded education, earning her the esteem of her contemporaries.

Because of her illness, Marie rarely left her hometown. In 1851, she made one journey in the Harz mountains, the catalyst for her literary activity. A travel letter she had sent to a relative under the title Prinzessin Ilse was published anonymously in 1852 as A Fairy Tale from the Harz Mountains. The story was widely successful, but Petersen's identity as the author only appeared in the twelfth edition, this time published with an additional tale. It was also translated into both English and French.

Marie did not live to see the great success of her two stories. She died in 1859 after a slight inflammation proved too much for her weak body.

== Works ==
- Prinzessin Ilse, a Fairy Tale from the Harz mountains, 1850 (25 editions by 1906)
  - English translation from Google Books
- Die Irrlichter (The will-o-the-Wisp), 1854 (48 editions by 1908)
  - English Translation from Google Books

== Bibliography ==
- Heinrich Groß: Deutsche Dichterinen und Schriftstellerinen in Wort und Bild. Fr. Thiel, Berlin 1885, pp. 430–433.
- Paul Hoffmann (1910). "Petersen, Marie" . Allgemeine Deutsche Biographie (in German). Vol. 55. Leipzig: Duncker & Humblot. pp. 576–577.
- Franz Brümmer: Lexikon der deutschen Dichter und Prosaisten vom Beginn des 19. Jahrhunderts bis zur Gegenwart. Reclam, Leipzig 1913, p. 261.
- Elisabeth Friedrichs: Die deutschsprachigen Schriftstellerinnen des 18. und 19. Jahrhunderts. Ein Lexikon. Metzler, Stuttgart 1981, ISBN 3-476-00456-2, (Repertorien zur deutschen Literaturgeschichte 9), p. 232.
