= Bremen Hut (Ilsenburg) =

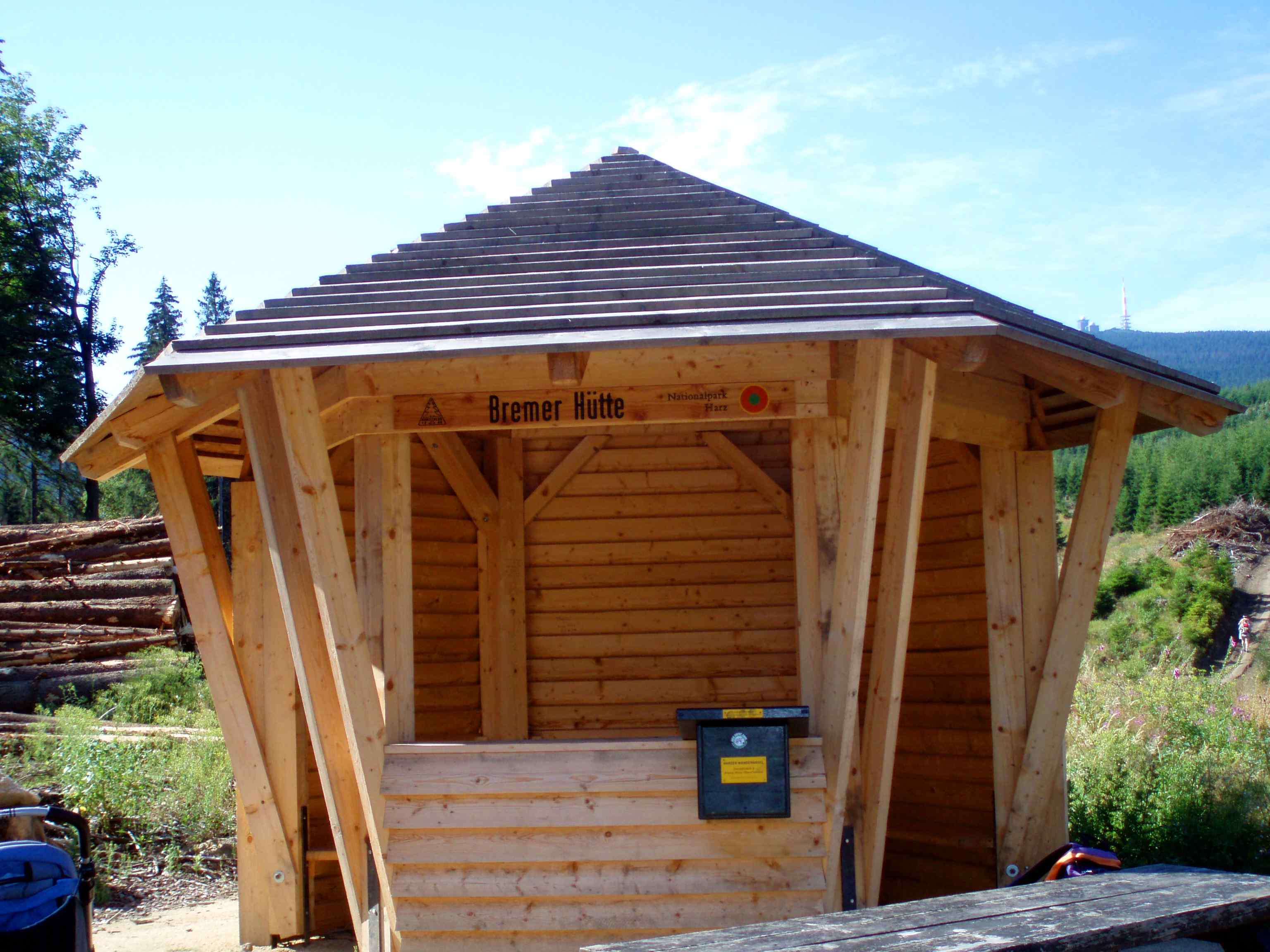
View of the Bremen Hut and the Brocken

The Bremen Hut (German: Bremer Hütte) in the Harz Mountains is a refuge hut and shelter in that part of the Harz National Park lying within the borough of Ilsenburg (Harz) in Harz district in the German state of Saxony-Anhalt.

== Location ==
The Bremen Hut is situated in the High Harz inside the Harz National Park. It stands in the Ilse valley near the Upper Ilse Falls (Obere Ilsefälle) about halfway as the crow flies between the town of Ilsenburg to the north-northwest, which lies on the northern rim of the Harz, and the Brocken to the south-southwest, at 1,141.1 metres above sea level the highest mountain in the Harz. To the west is the Scharfenstein (697.6 m) and to the east is the forest inn of Plessenburg (ca. 542 m). The hut itself is found at an elevation of 530 metres above sea level (NN).

== History ==
The first Bremen Hut, which various accounts state was about 30 to 50 metres below the present hut - downstream on the slopes of the Ilse valley - was erected at the end of the 19th century by ramblers from the Hanseatic City of Bremen, after which the hut was named. A new Bremen Hut was erected in 2008 after its predecessor had been destroyed in a storm.

== Hiking ==
=== Heinrich Heine Trail ===
The Heinrich Heine Trail (Heinrich-Heine-Wanderweg) runs past the Bremen Hut heading for the legendary Brocken mountain. The Bremen Hut is checkpoint no. 6 in the Harzer Wandernadel hiking network.

=== Stempelsbuche ===
Immediately northeast of a fork in the tracks 1.1 kilometres south-southwest of the Bremen Hut by the Ilse tributary, the Keelbeck, (637.7 m above NN; 51°49′9.6″N 10°37′40.5″E) once stood a mighty beech tree called the Stempelsbuche. Today only the stump is left. Nearby is a small refuge hut. The spot is checkpoint no. 8 in the Harzer Wandernadel hiking system.
