= ILSE =

ILSE can refer to:

- International Life Saving Federation of Europe - the European branch of the International Life Saving Federation.
- IntraLase - medical laser company.
- Instituto Libre de Segunda Enseñanza - a high-school in Buenos Aires, Argentina.
