= Ilze Krontāle =

Latvian ice hockey player

Ilze Krontāle (born 28 November 1986) is a Latvian ice hockey player. She is a member of the Laima Rīga team and the Latvia women's national ice hockey team.
