= Steinerne Renne =

Waterfall and natural monument in Wernigerode, Germany

Coordinates: 51°48′19″N 10°42′01″E

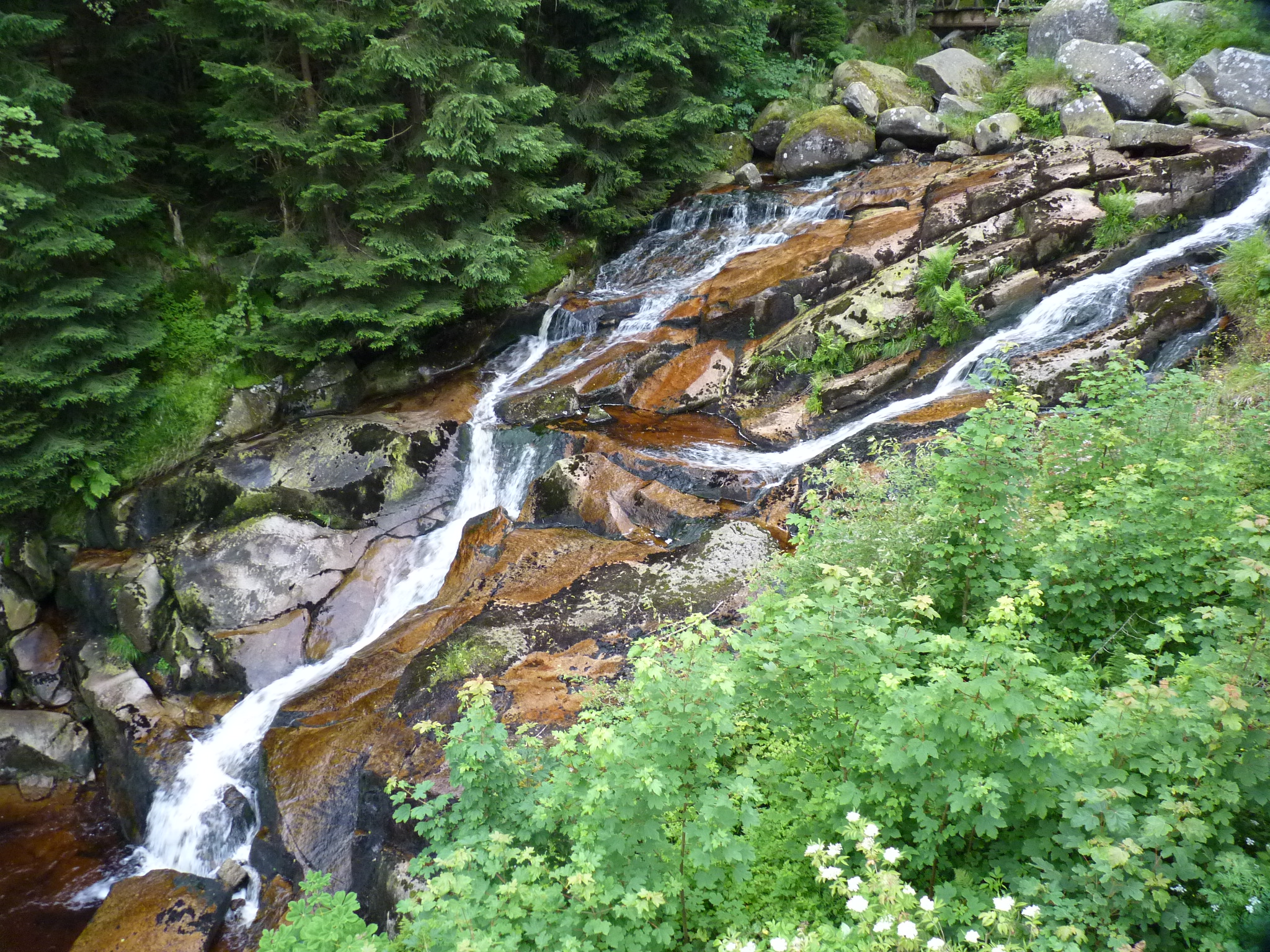
The Steinerne Renne on the upper reaches of the Holtemme

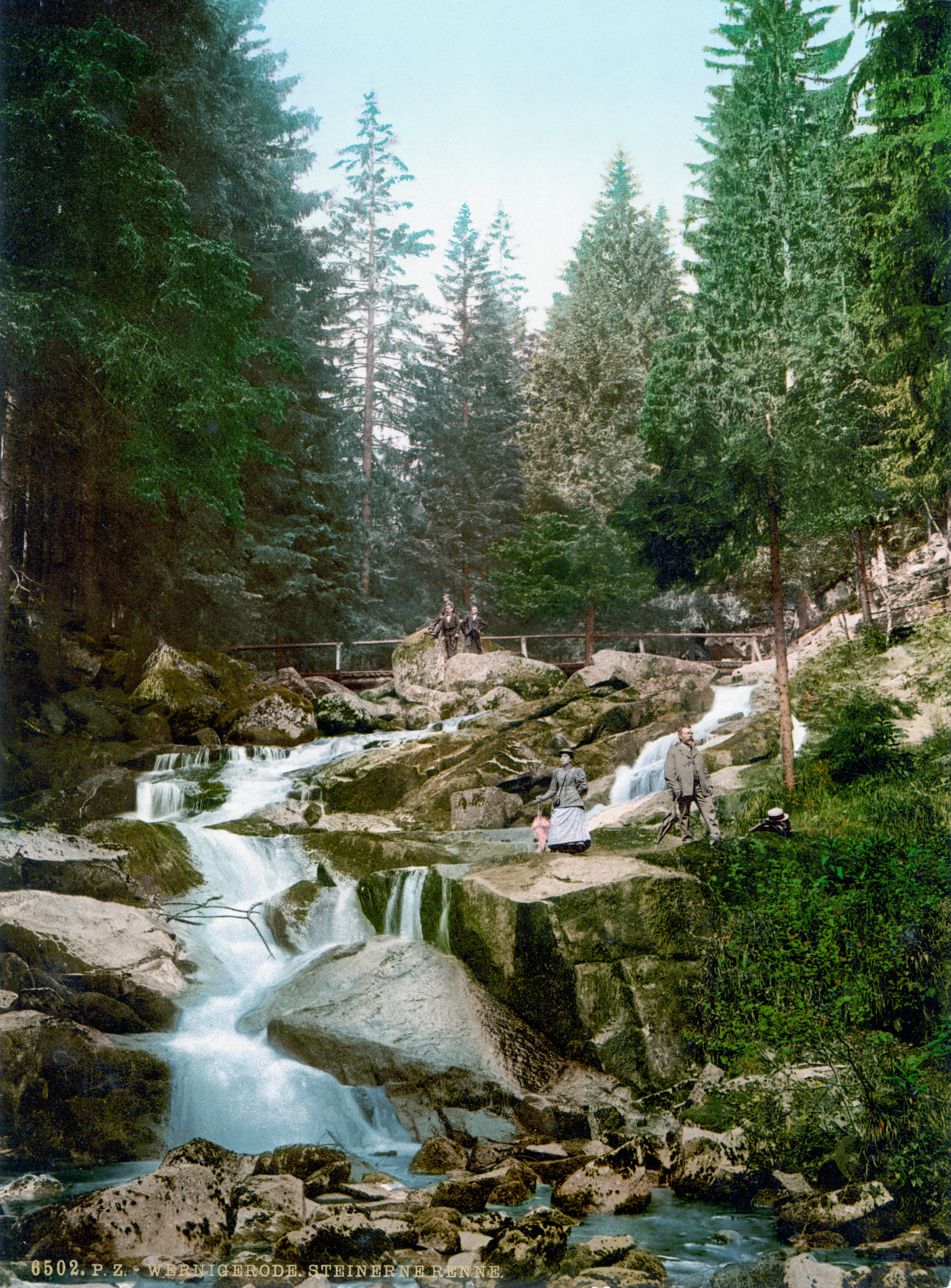
The Steinerne Renne around 1900

The Steinerne Renne is a waterfall and natural monument near the town of Wernigerode, Saxony-Anhalt, in the Harz mountains of central Germany.

== Location ==
The Steinerne Renne is east of the Harz National Park in the Harz/Saxony-Anhalt Nature Park. It lies southwest of Hasserode in the borough of Wernigerode in a forested stretch of the valley formed by the upper reaches of the Holtemme river between the hill of Renneckenberg (eastern neighbour of the Brocken) some distance away to the southwest, between the Bielstein (ca. 525 m above sea level (NN)) to the north and the ridge of Hippeln and the Kontorberg (556.1 m) to the south.

In the gorge, numerous small waterfalls and rapids alternate with quieter stretches of water in the Holtemme's rock and boulder-strewn riverbed. The entrance to the gorge below the Hannekenbruch lies at a height of about 550 m above NN and the exit is below Steinerne Renne railway station at around 300 m above NN, a height difference of about 250 metres. At 395.0 m the Kleine Renne empties into the Steinerne Renne from the left.

The Steinerne Renne forest inn and hotel is perched above the point in river where it is 519.5 m high. In addition, there used to be a footbridge over the Holtemme somewhat further east (346.0 m) and a restaurant, Am Silbernern Mann, below the rocks known as the Silberner Mann.

== History ==
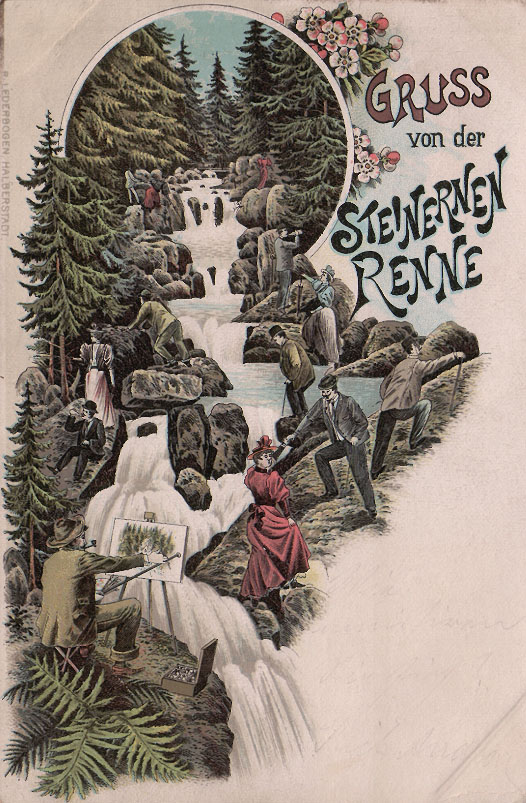
The Steinerne Renne around 1900

This natural feature was already described as the Steinrenne or steinerne Rinne by the Early Modern Period. With the rise of tourism in the middle of the 19th century the Steinerne Renne became one of the most popular beauty spots in the Harz. When the Harz and Brocken Railways were built a small station was even built for the Steinerne Renne which still exists today. In 1869 a log cabin was built immediately next to the waterfall, the predecessor of the present-day hotel.

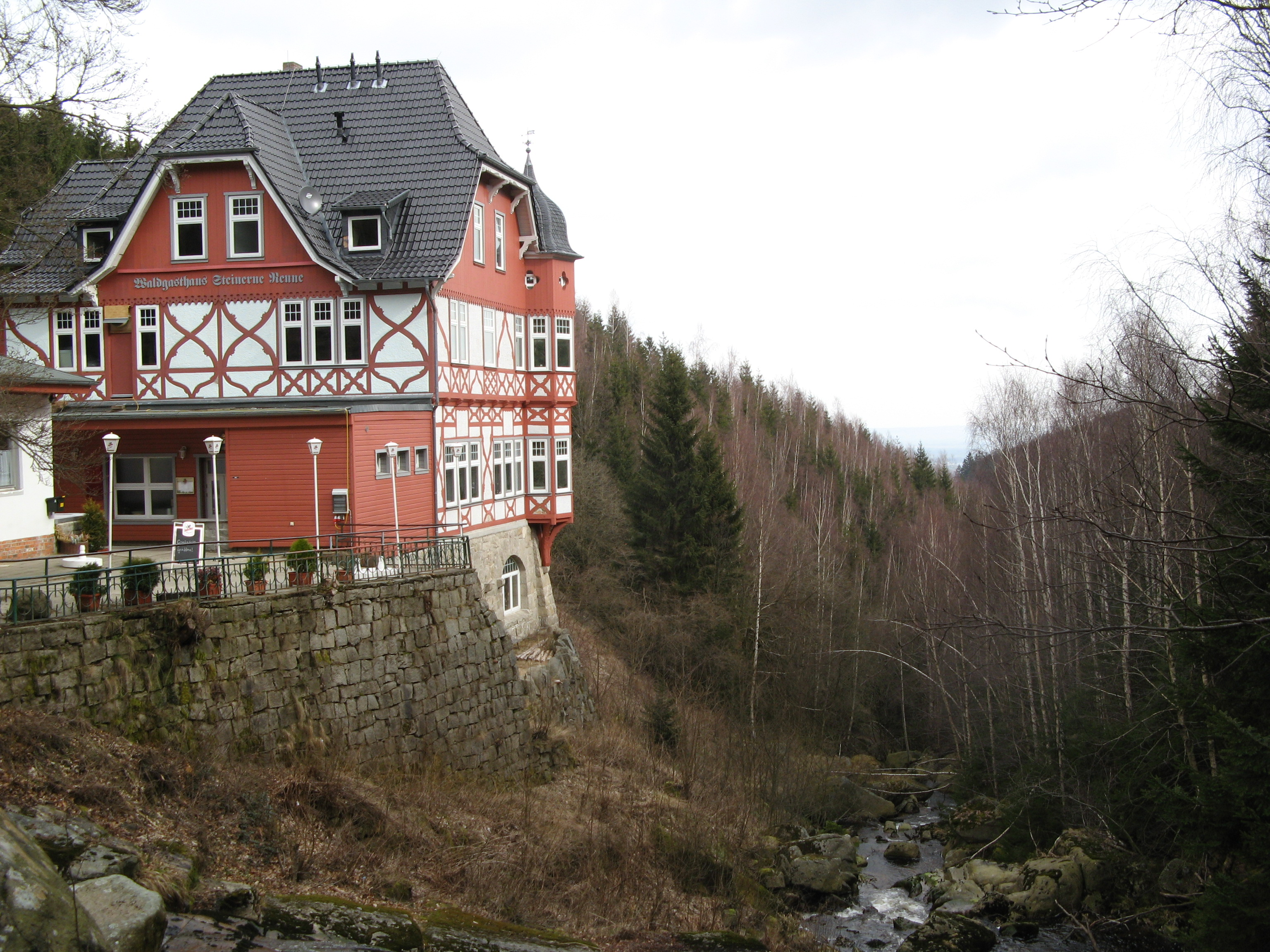
The Steinerne Renne a forest inn and hotel

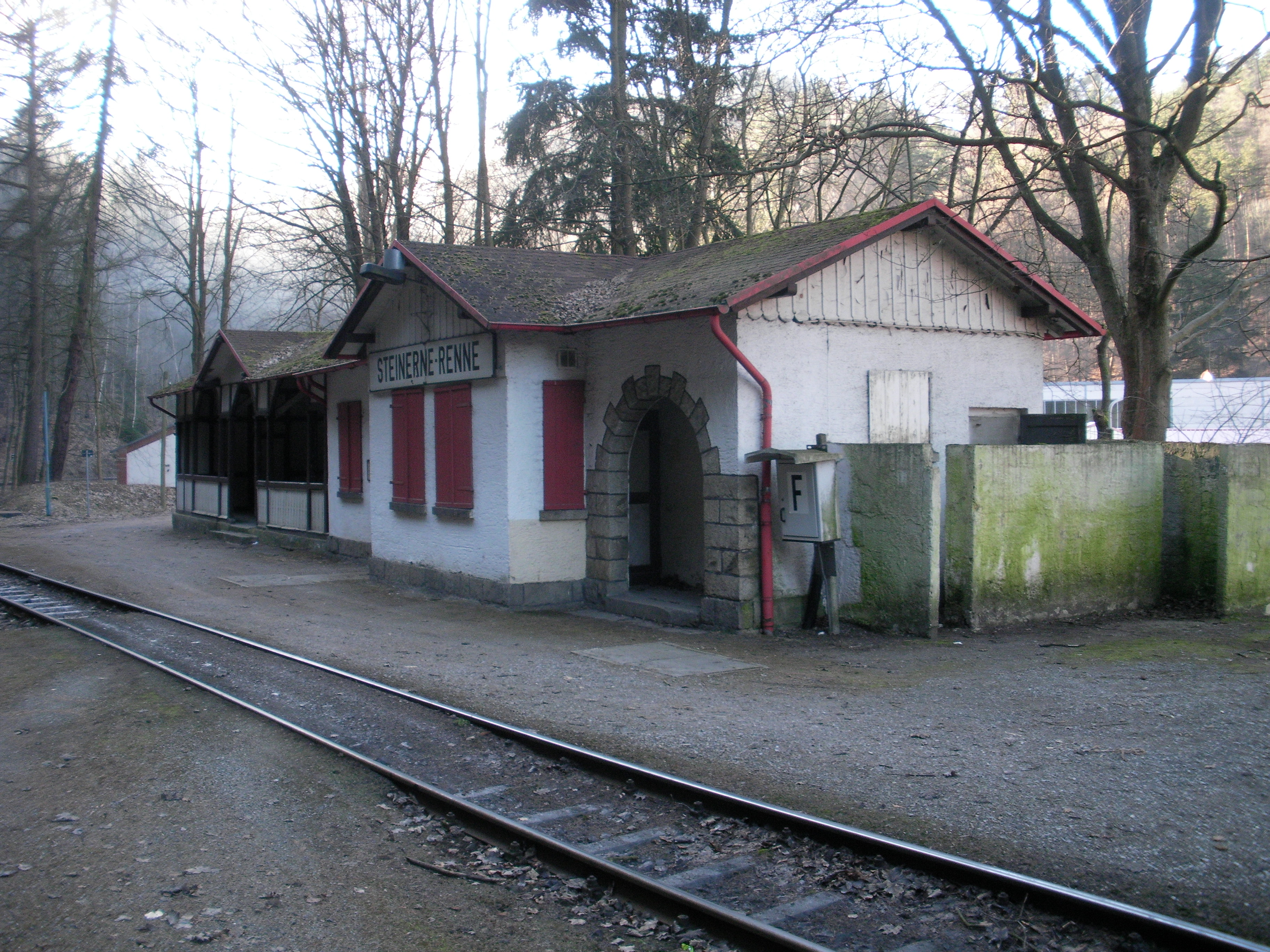
Steinerne Renne station

During the post-war period the spot ended up in East Germany and the hotel building was operated until the mid-1970s as a Handelsorganisation pub. Later it was converted and used as a works holiday home for the VEB Elektroaaparatewerke Berlin-Treptow, a German electrical machinery combine. The holiday home also had a public restaurant . When the building was converted, the romantic woodland path to the pub, which ran along the northern side of the Holtemme and past the waterfall, was blocked. Today the footpath runs along the southern bank of the river.

The Steinerne Renne Hotel (Gasthaus Steinerne Renne) is No. 28 in the system of checkpoints in the Harzer Wandernadel.

== Hydroelectricity ==
Near Steinerne Renne station there is a hydropower plant, opened in 1899, which was used to power the gravel and granite works operating in those days. In 1943 it went into the possession of the town of Wernigerode, which used it to supply power to the district of Hasserode. From 1945 it was run by the VEB Energiekombinat Magdeburg, later the VEB Instandsetzungsbetrieb für Batterien und Flurfördergeräte. After its privatization as WERBAT GmbH, the hydroelectric plant was sold in 1995 to a private owner. In 2002 it was sold back to the town, who operate it today as a technical monument.

The water taken from a weir below the inn along a 1.7-kilometre enclosed channel to the screen house, where suspended solids are filtered out. Behind that, it drops over a 160 metre long penstock to the hydroelectric power plant. The current is generated by two Pelton turbines.

== Concentration subcamp ==
On the site of the former granite and gravel plant, which has been used since 1944 as the Steinerne Renne Brickworks and for the construction of parts for aircraft engines, a subcamp of the Mittelbau-Dora concentration camp was built. Initially French, Belgian and Italian forced labourers worked in the subcamp. Later 500 prisoners from the former subcamp on Veckenstedter Way in Wernigerode worked here. One day before the occupation of the camp by American troops on 10 April 1945 they were sent on a death march to Leitmeritz.
