= Ilsa =

Ilsa may refer to:

== People ==
- Ilsa J. Bick (fl. 1999–present), American science fiction writer
- Ilsa Konrads (born 1944), Australian freestyle swimmer

== Fictional characters ==
- Ilsa Lund, in the 1942 film Casablanca
- Ilsa, protagonist of a sexploitation film series starting with Ilsa, She Wolf of the SS (1975)
- Ilsa Brandes, title character of Ilsa (novel), a 1946 novel by Madeleine L'Engle
- Ilsa Pucci, from the TV series Human Target
- Ilsa Shickelgrubermeiger, from the TV series The Suite Life of Zack and Cody
- Ilsa Faust, in the films Mission: Impossible – Rogue Nation (2015), and its sequel Mission: Impossible – Fallout (2018)

== ILSA ==
- International Law Students Association, a non-profit association of students and lawyers dedicated to the promotion of international law
- Interstate Land Sales Full Disclosure Act of 1968, US Congressional act passed to facilitate regulation of interstate land sales
- Iran and Libya Sanctions Act, a 1996 act of the US Congress that imposed economic sanctions on firms doing business with Iran and Libya
- Intermodalidad de Levante S.A., a.k.a. Iryo, a Spanish operator of high-speed trains
- Instrument for Lunar Seismic Activity in Chandrayaan-3 will measure the seismicity around the landing site on Moon.

== Other uses ==
- Tropical Storm Ilsa (disambiguation), various cyclones
- Ilsa (novel), a 1946 novel by Madeleine L'Engle

== See also ==
- Ilse (disambiguation)
