= Ilze =

- Gender: Female
- Name day: 27 January

Origin
- Origin: Variant of Elizabete
- Region of origin: Latvia and Scandinavia

Other names
- Related names: Ilse, Ilsa

Ilze is a popular given name in Latvia and Scandinavia, first recorded as a given name of Latvians in 1458. It is a variant of Elizabeth and is cognate with the German given name Ilse. Notable people with the name include:

- Ilze Bērziņa (born 1984), Latvian chess player and Woman Grandmaster (2009)
- Ilze Blicavs, former Australian women's basketball player
- Ilze Graubiņa (1941–2001), Latvian pianist
- Ilze Gribule (born 1984), Latvia javelin thrower
- Ilze Hattingh (born 1996), South African tennis player
- Ilze Indriksone (born 1974), Latvian environmental planner and politician
- Ilze Jākobsone (born 1994), Latvian basketball player
- Ilze Jaunalksne (born 1976), Latvian journalist
- Ilze Krontāle (born 1986), Latvian ice hockey player
- Ilze Lankhaar or Candee Jay (born 1981), Dutch electronica artist
- Ilze Liepa (born 1963), Russian ballet dancer and actress
- Ilze Rubene (1958–2002), Latvian chess player and Woman International Master
- Ilze Viņķele (born 1971), Latvian politician, current Minister for Welfare of Latvia
- Ilze Ziedins, New Zealand statistician
