= Ilse (Bega) =

River in Germany

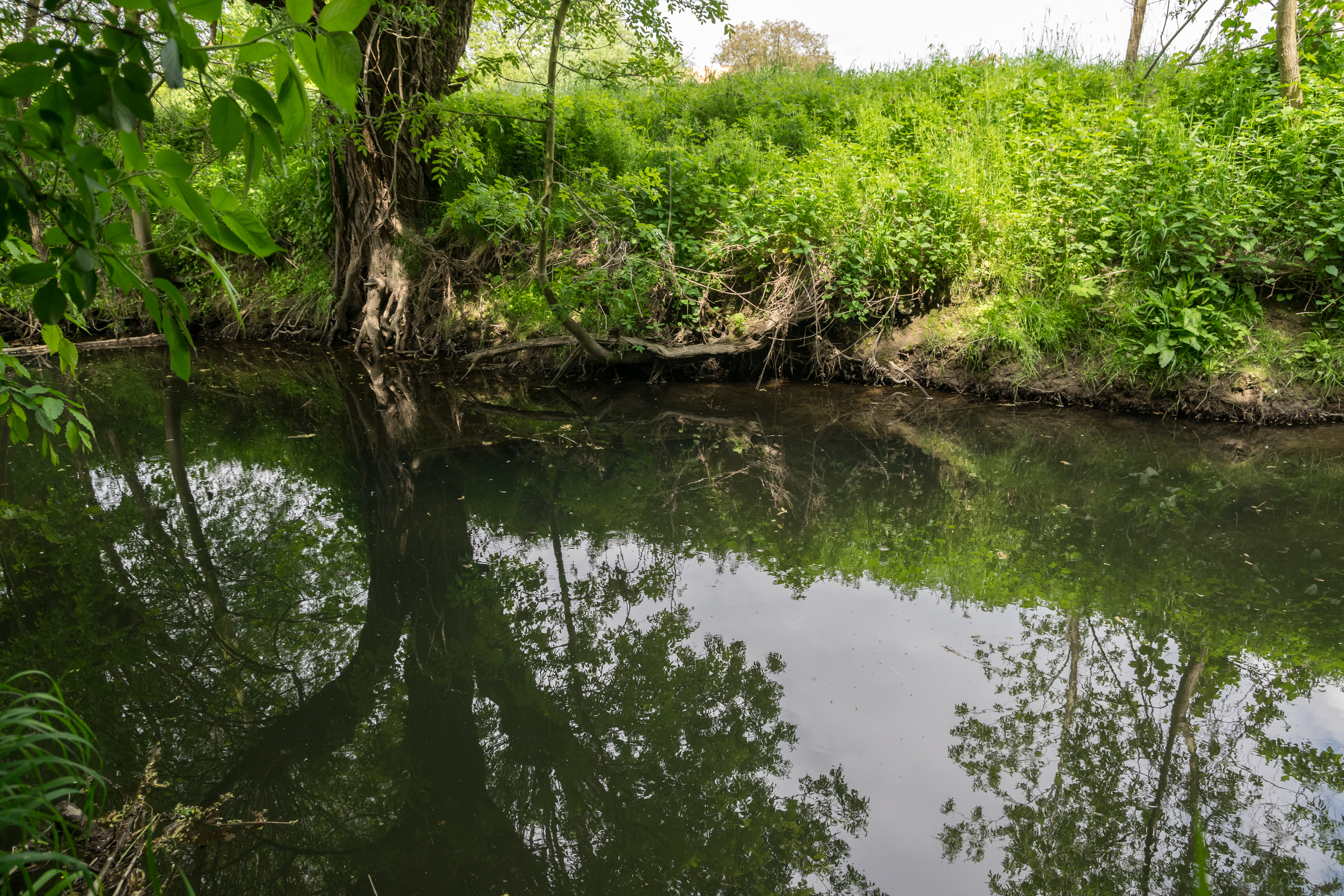

Location
- Country: Germany
- State: North Rhine-Westphalia

Physical characteristics
- Mouth
  - location: Bega
  - coordinates: 52°01′29″N 8°49′55″E
- Length: 15.1 km (9.4 mi)

Basin features
- Progression: Bega→ Werre→ Weser→ North Sea

Ilse is a river of North Rhine-Westphalia, Germany. It is a right tributary of the Bega near Lemgo.

== See also ==
- List of rivers of North Rhine-Westphalia
