= Die Harzreise =

Travel report by Heinrich Heine

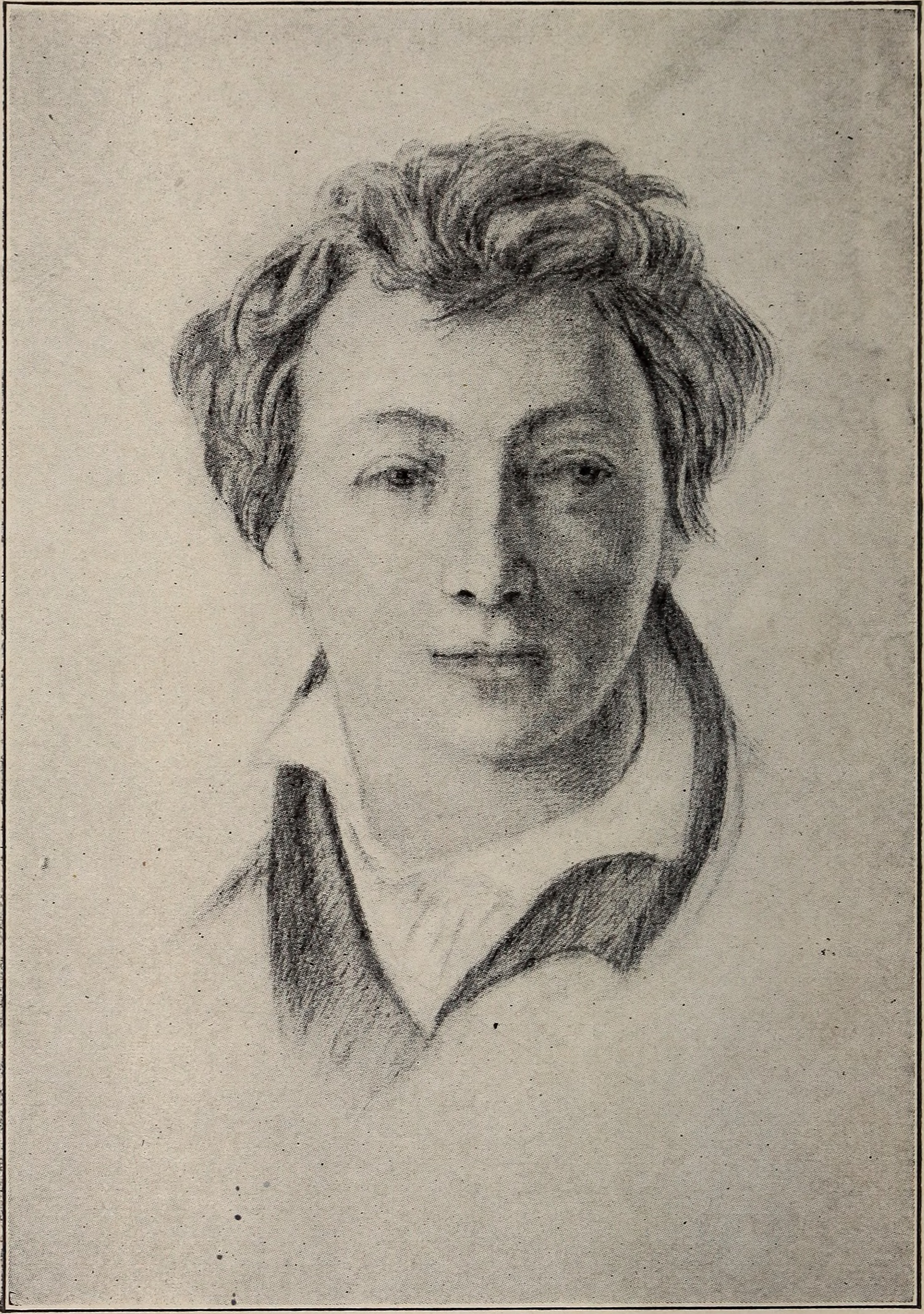
Heine as a student

Die Harzreise ("The Harz Journey") is a travel report by German poet and author Heinrich Heine on a journey to the Harz mountains. Compiled in autumn 1824, it was first published as a serial in January and February 1826 in the magazine Der Gesellschafter by Friedrich Wilhelm Gubitz and ran for 14 instalments. Some censorship changes were made beforehand. Later in 1826 Die Harzreise appeared in the first part of the Reisebilder ("Pictures of travel") collection. For the book, Heine made revisions and changes, and added the famous Göttingen section. Heine himself described his record as a literary fragment. The book was the first of Heine's to be published by Hoffmann & Campe in Hamburg, the publisher who later brought out all Heine's writings.

== Content ==
In his work, Heinrich Heine describes his journey as a student from Göttingen, where he had attended the Georgia Augusta University in 1820/21, through the Harz range and over its highest mountain, the Brocken summit, to the small town of Ilsenburg. During the trip he meets well known and unknown contemporaries, who he sometimes describes in detail and compares with other people, sometimes historical protagonists.

For example, he meets in Göttingen the physician and (like Heine) Jewish Burschenschaft member, Karl Friedrich Heinrich Marx and recounts their exchange about medicine as well as Marx' treatise, Goettingen in medicinischer, physischer und historischer Hinsicht ("Göttingen From a Medical, Physical and Historic Perspective").

Nature is also a subject of this travel account:

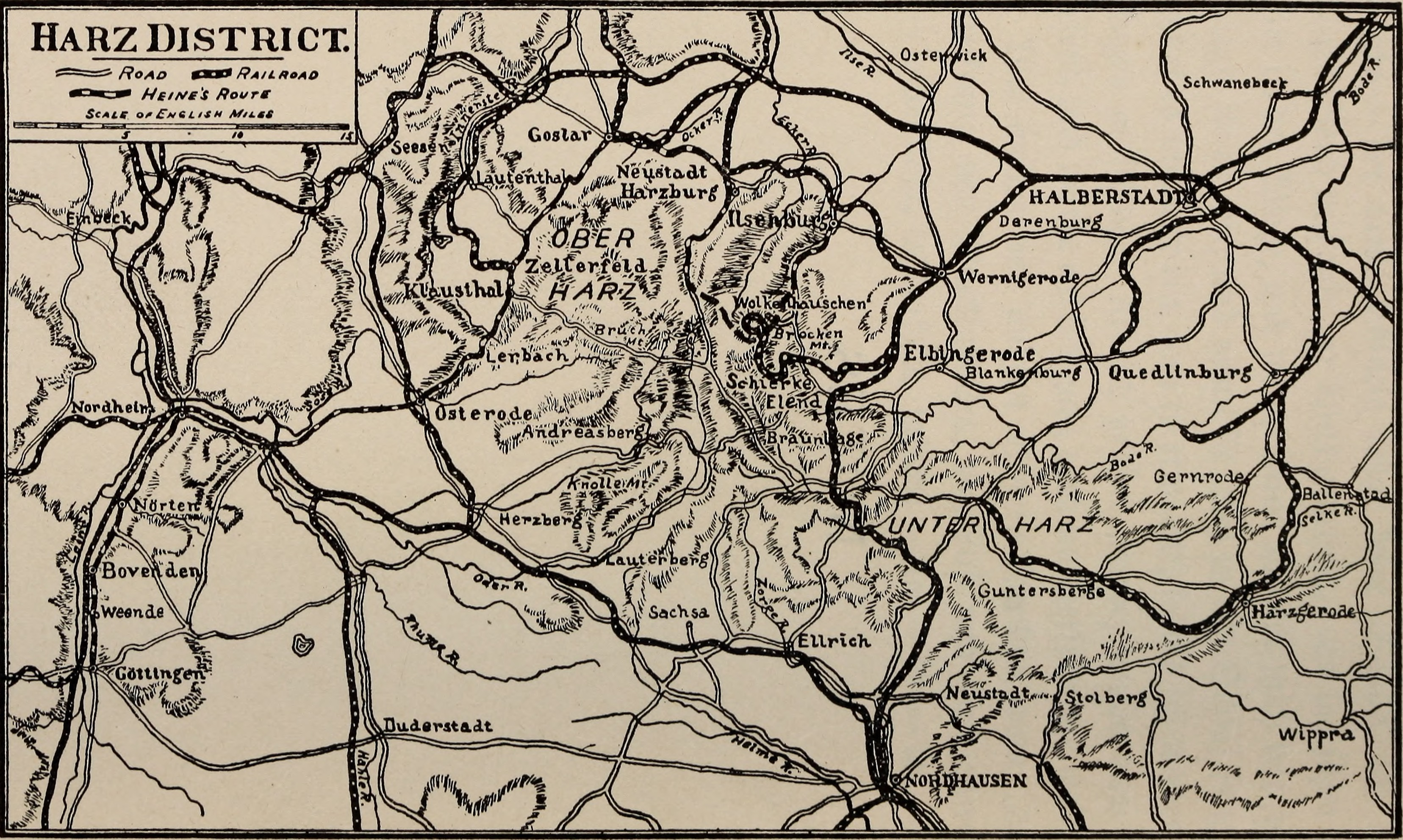
Heine's route

In the work, he mentions all the rest points and overnight stops made by this group of travelling poets:

- Göttingen,
- Weende,
- Nörten,
- Osterode,
- Lerbach,
- Clausthal,
- Zellerfeld,
- Goslar,
- the Rammelsberg mines,
- the rivers Leine, Ilse, Bode, Selke and many others.

The route, which took Heinrich Heine about four weeks, has become a trail that tourists can follow in and which, as the Heinrich Heine Way (Heinrich-Heine-Weg) is described in several travel guides.

A duel, which was illegal at the time, between students is also a subject of his writings. Heine himself had to leave Göttingen University due to a duel affair after antisemitic hostilities; the Göttingen chapter reflects his bad experiences.

== Appraisal ==
The work goes far beyond what might be expected from the early works of a budding writer. Romantic longing and disappointment, illusion and irony are already freely woven into the writing:

This is now the Ilse, the lovely, sweet Ilse. She runs through the blessed Ilse valley, on whose twin sides the mountains rise gradually higher, and they are, down to their feet, most often covered in beech, oak and familiar leafy bushes, no longer in firs and other pinewood trees. ... Yes, the legend is true, the Ilse is a princess, who runs down the mountainside, blooming and laughing. How her white bubbling robe glints in the sunshine! How her silver sashes flutter in the wind! How her diamonds sparkle and flash!.

== Translations ==
- Heinrich Heine's Pictures of travel - pocket book of the Making of America Project, Charles Godfrey Leland by BiblioBazaar

== Literature ==
- Die Harzreise bei Reclam, mit Anmerkungen und Ergänzungen
- Heinrich Heine: Die Harzreise, read by Martina Gedeck, Unterlauf & Zschiedrich Hörbuchverlag, 2006, ISBN 978-3-934384-32-3
- Heinrich Heine: Die Harzreise, in: Derselbe: Reisebilder. Erster Teil. Hoffmann und Campe, Hamburg, 1826, S. 111 ff. digitalised and full text im Deutsches Textarchiv
- Heinrich Heine: Die Harzreise (New York, H. Holt and company, 1912), edited by Robert Herndon Fife.
