= Ilse valley =

Coordinates: 51°51′01″N 10°39′58″E

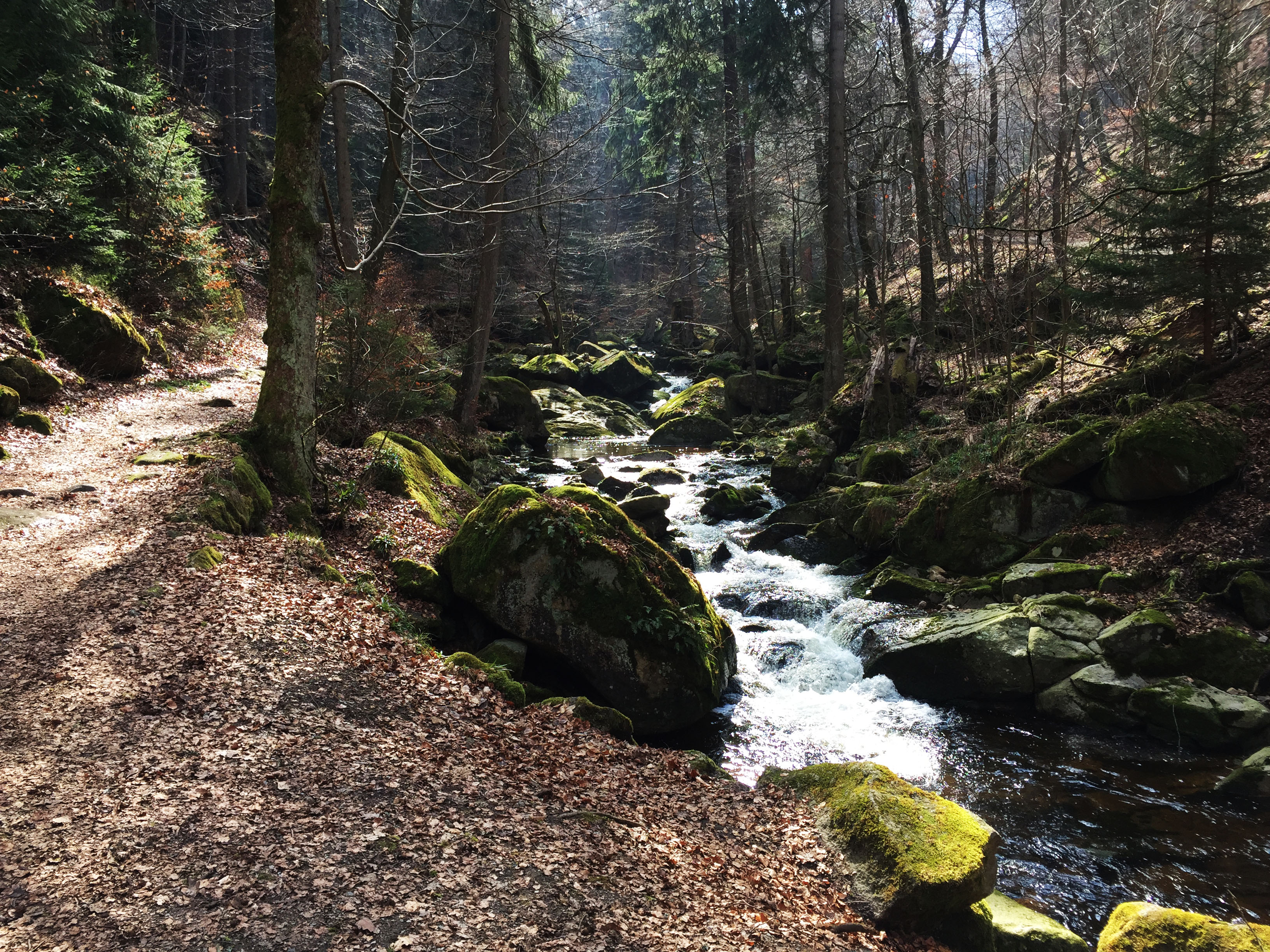
Ilse river

The Ilse valley (German: Ilsetal) is the ravine of the Ilse stream in the northern boundary of the Harz mountain range in Germany. Part of the Harz National Park, it runs from the town of Ilsenburg at the foot of the mountain range up to the source region near the summit of the Brocken massif, the highest mountain of the range. The scenic valley is a popular hiking area.

As one approaches the steep northwestern edge of the Harz, one can see its more prominent peaks. Between Goslar and Wernigerode, the mountains are especially striking, where their slopes rise steeply from the northern foothills. Between the mountains of the Harz rim run deep gorges. These include those of the Ilse river as well as the parallel valleys of the Oker, Ecker and Bode (Bode Gorge).

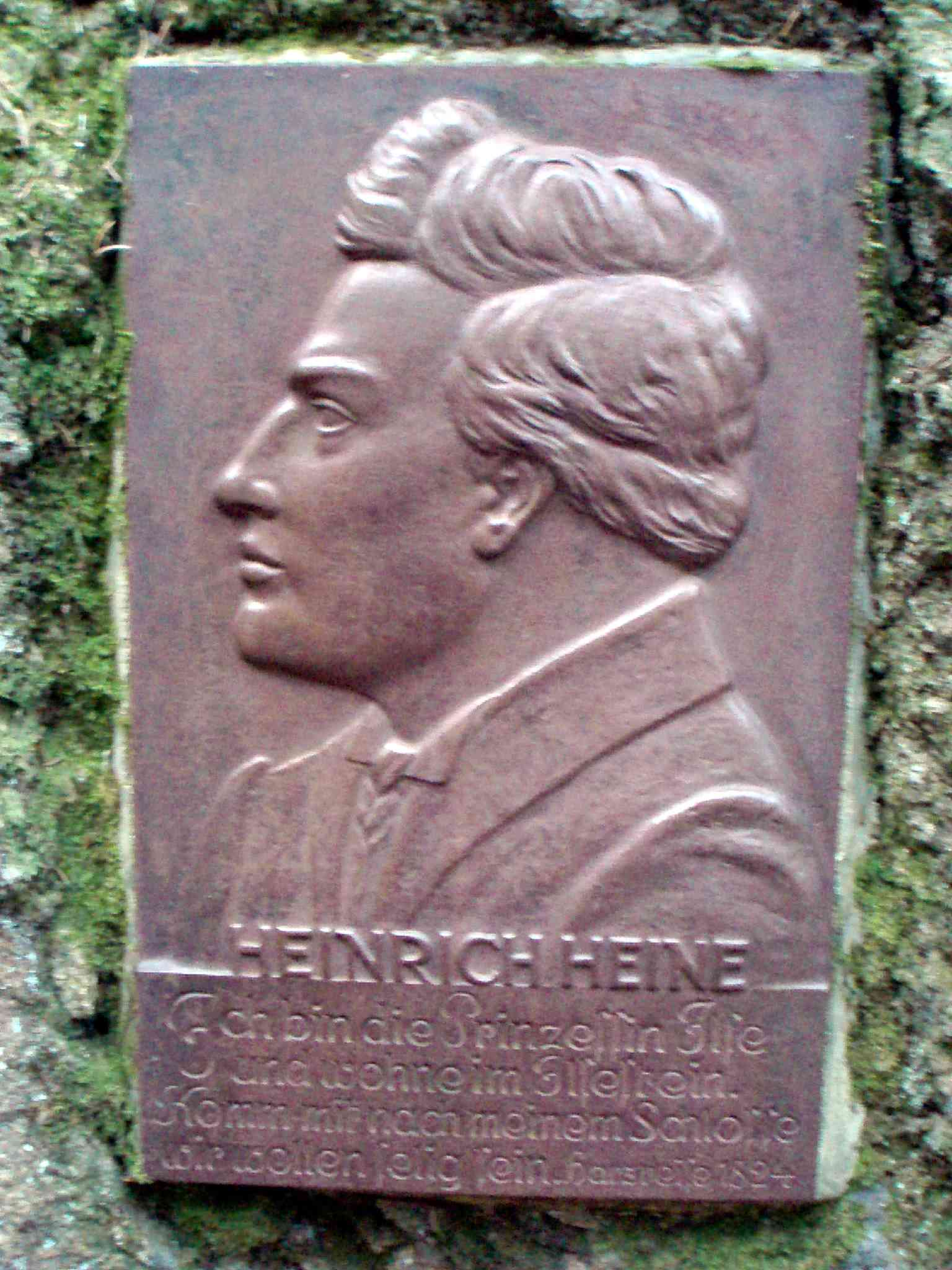
Heine memorial tablet

Heinrich Heine, the famous German writer, described the Ilse valley with its little river and the rocks of the Ilsestein enthroned above it. In the 1830s, a country road was built from Ilsenburg through the Ilse valley running past the Brocken massif up to Schierke, paid for by Count Henry of Stolberg-Wernigerode (1772–1854). The road made it much easier for tourists to reach the higher mountain regions; today it is closed to public traffic.

The Brocken (1,141 m above NN) can be climbed from Ilsenburg (250 m above NN) via the 'Heinrich Heine Way' and the Plessenburg lodge on a 15 kilometres (9.3 mi) long hiking trail. In or near the Ilse valley are the following checkpoints on the Harzer Wandernadel hiking network (in downstream order with checkpoint numbers in brackets): Gelber Brink (22), Große Zeterklippe (10), Brocken House (9), Stempelsbuche (8), Bremer Hütte (6), Gasthaus Ilsestein (30) and Froschfelsen (5).
