= Ilza Sternicka-Niekrasz =

Polish pianist and composer

Ilza Sternicka-Niekrasz (September 20, 1898 — June 27, 1932) was a Russian/Polish pianist and composer.

Sternicka-Niekrasz was born in Saint Petersburg. She studied in Saint Petersburg Conservatory under Alexander Glazunov and Vasily Kalafati then in Warsaw Conservatory under Henryk Melcer-Szczawiński, Roman Statkowski and Karol Szymanowski.

== Compositions ==
- Baśń, fantasy for piano and orchestra (1927)
- Szachy, symphonic grotesque (1931)
- Oratorium (fragments performed in 1929 in Poznań)
- Variations for string quartet
- Double fugue for string quintet
- Groteski dla dzieci for flute, clarinet and bassoon (for children)
- Kolory, suite for piano (a fragment published in 1931)
- Piano sonata in F minor
- Songs for voice with piano (including Ojcze nasz, published in 1935)
- Songs for children
