= Ilza Niemack =

American violinist (1903–1993)

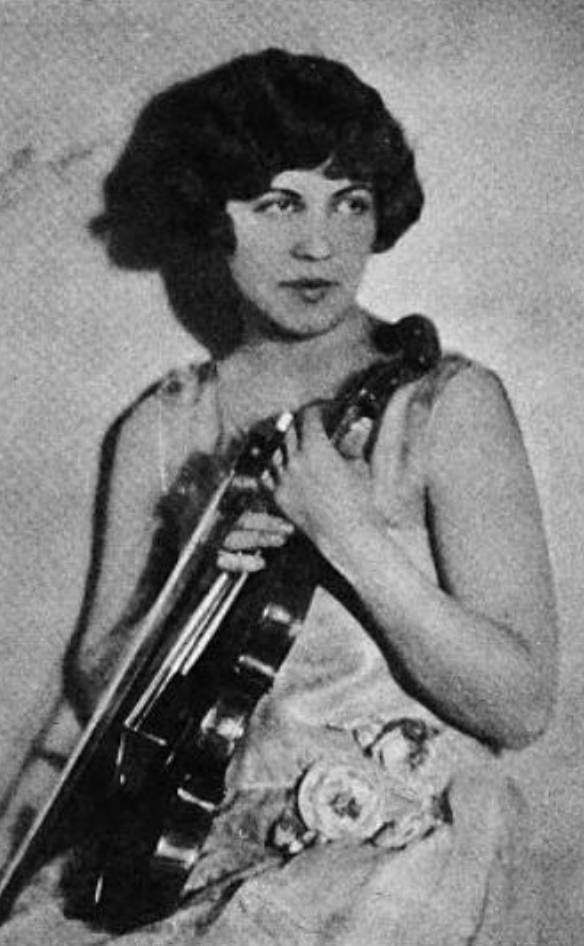
- Ilza Niemack, from a 1927 publication
- Born: Ilse Louise Niemack; April 8, 1903; Charles City, Iowa, U.S.
- Died: July 12, 1993 (aged 90); Sedona, Arizona, U.S.
- Occupations: Violinist, composer, college professor

Ilza Louise Niemack (April 8, 1903 – July 12, 1993), born Ilse Niemack, was an American violinist, composer, and music educator. She taught at Iowa State University from 1935 to 1973, and the concert mistress of the Iowa State Symphony.

== Early life and education ==
Niemack was born in Charles City, Iowa, the daughter of Julius Niemack and Stella Blumenstiel Niemack. Her father was a medical doctor born in Germany. Both of her parents were musical. She began performing violin in early childhood. She attended the Chicago Musical College, and studied with Leon Sametini and Leopold Auer. She also studied composition and theory with Felix Borowski and Rubin Goldmark.

== Career ==
Niemack played an Amati violin built in 1655, a gift from her father when she made her New York debut at age 18. She toured in Germany, England, and the United States as a young woman. She played sonatas that she composed at New York City recitals in 1927 and 1934. She also played her Sonata in G Minor at the 1929 convention of the Society of Music Teachers of Iowa, accompanied by her mother on piano. "Perhaps no greater Iowa violinist, at least no other with greater promise, is living today than Miss Ilza Niemack," noted a report in the journal of the Iowa State Teachers Association in 1928. She gave her first radio concert in 1928, at Chicago's WLS. She was a soloist with the St. Louis Symphony Orchestra at a concert in Iowa in 1938. In 1941, she premiered another sonata she composed, in a performance with pianist Rudolph Ganz.

Niemack joined the music faculty at Iowa State University in 1935, as a lecturer; she rose to the rank of assistant professor in 1945, then associate professor in 1948, and became a full professor in 1971, before she retired with emeritus status in 1973. She was concert mistress of the Iowa State Symphony, and founder and member of the Amati Trio. She was also a member of the Braunschweiger String Quartet, with other Iowa State faculty.

Ned Rorem composed Day Music, a suite of eight movements, commissioned by Iowa State's department of music, in honor of Niemack, who played the work at its 1972 premiere. She continued to play chamber music in concerts after she retired to Arizona.

== Compositions ==
- Sonata in G Minor (1920s)
- Sonata No. 3 in G Minor (1941)
- Concerto in D Minor for violin and orchestra (1940s)

== Personal life and legacy ==
Niemack died in 1993, in Sedona, Arizona, at the age of 90. Her papers, including her manuscript musical compositions, are in special collections at Iowa State University, and there is a brick paver honoring Niemack and three other musicians in the university's Plaza of Heroines. Iowa State also has a Niemack Memorial Scholarship for music students. She was mentioned on an episode of the Ribbons & Bows podcast in 2019.
