= Ilse (Oker) =

River in Germany

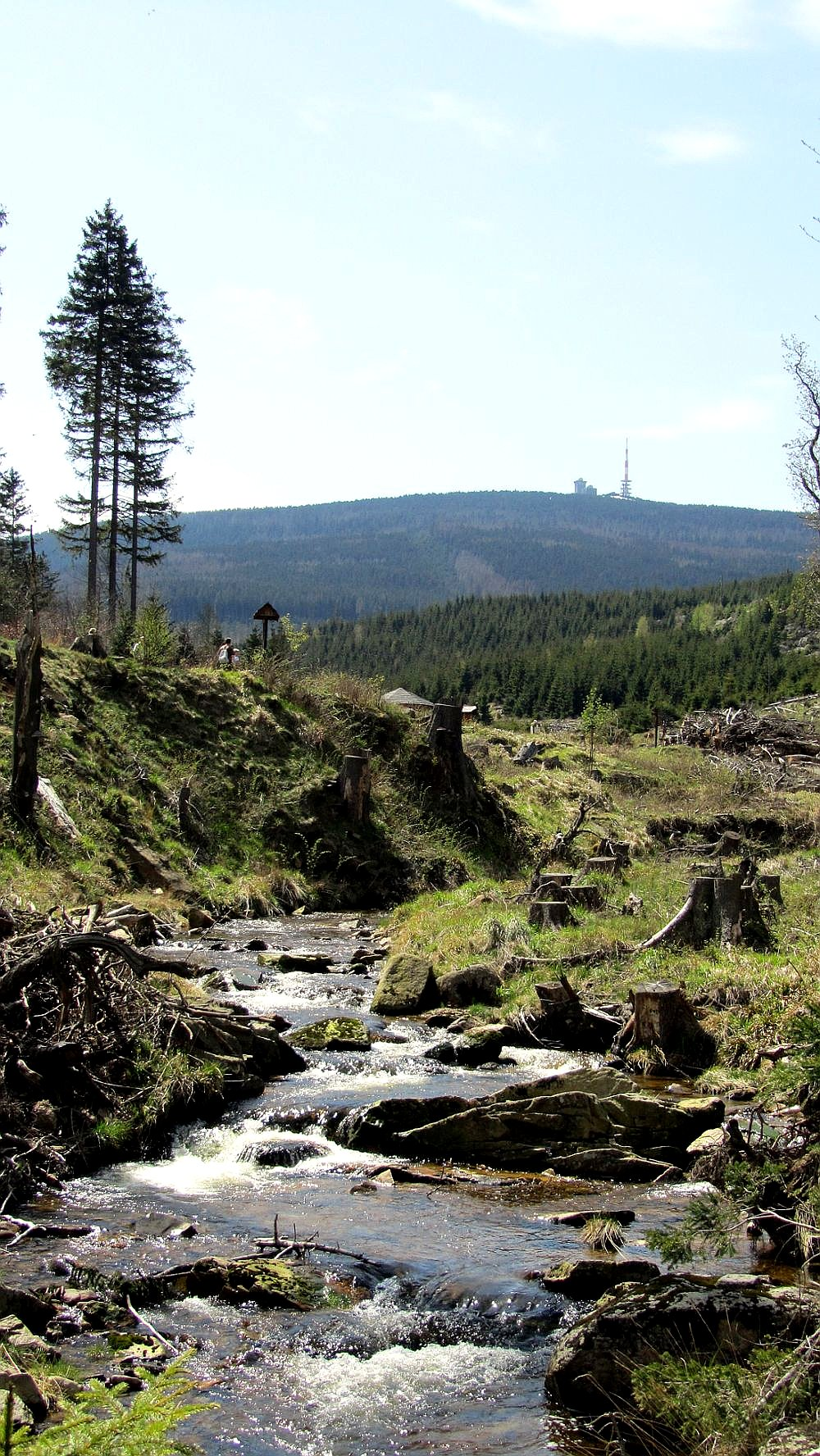
- The Ilse valley with the Brocken in the distance (2012)

Location
- Country: Germany
- Location: Harz

Physical characteristics
- Source
  - location: below the Brocken
  - elevation: ca. 900 m
- Mouth: Oker
  - location: Near Börßum
  - coordinates: 52°04′09″N 10°34′11″E
  - elevation: 82 m
- Length: 40 km (25 mi)

Basin features
- Progression: Oker→ Aller→ Weser→ North Sea
- Landmarks: Small towns: Ilsenburg; Villages: Osterwieck, Veckenstedt, Wasserleben, Hornburg

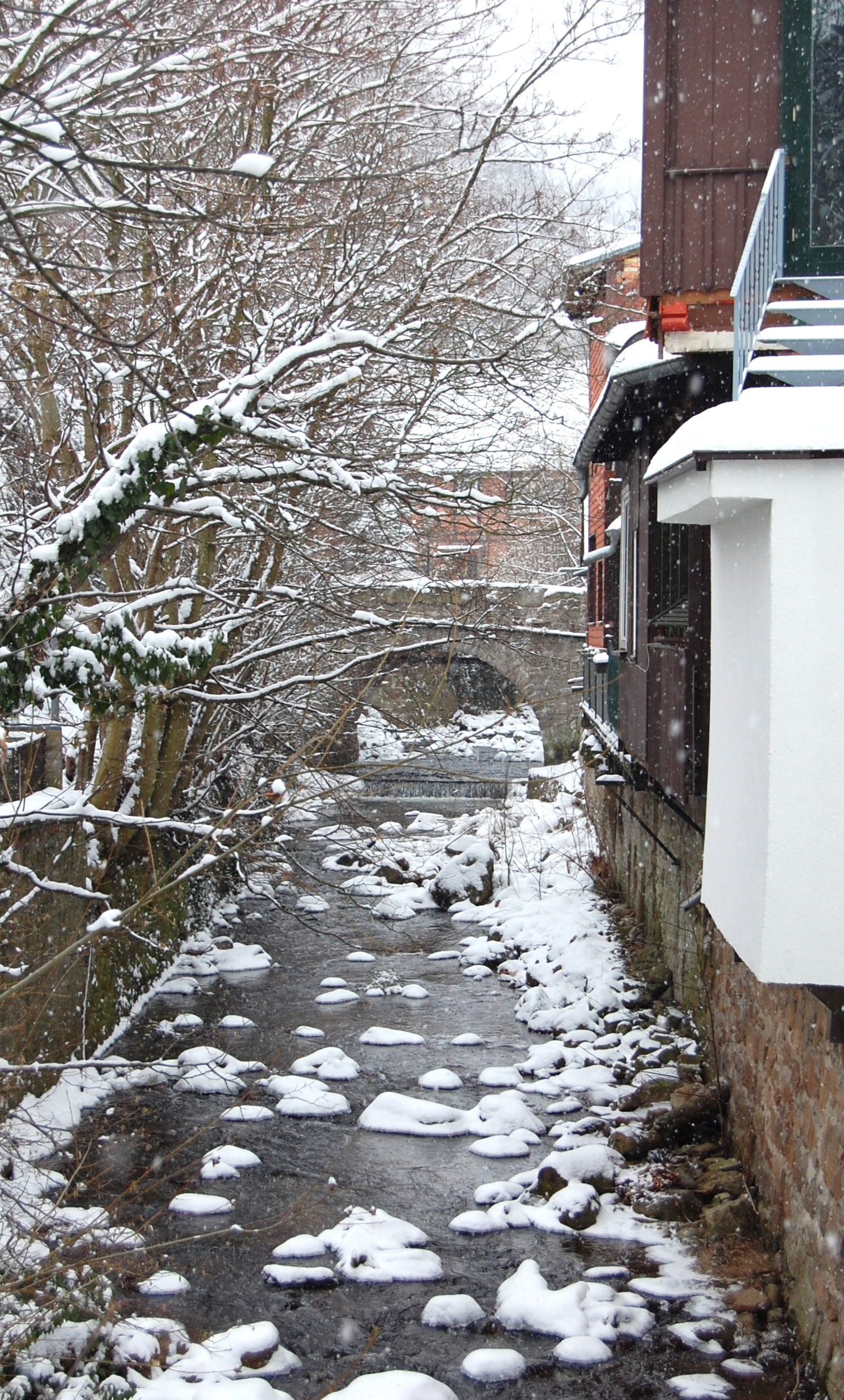
A wintry Ilse in Ilsenburg, the Krug Bridge in the background

The Ilse is a river of Saxony-Anhalt and Lower Saxony, Germany.

It rises at about 900 metres (3,000 ft) above sea level on the northern slopes of the Brocken. During its first few kilometres it flows as a narrow brook, almost invisible to the observer, down the side of the Brocken. Known here as the Verdeckte Ilse ("hidden Ilse") it gurgles its way under blocks of granite that hide the stream bed from above.

The Ilse then rushes through the narrow Ilse valley, hemmed in to the east by the rugged, cross-topped Ilsestein, passes by Ilsenburg into the Harz Foreland, flows through Veckenstedt, Wasserleben, Osterwieck and Hornburg and discharges into the Oker near Börßum together with the Schiffgraben from the Großes Bruch. Its total length is around 40 kilometres (25 mi).

Local folklore personifies the river as the beautiful Princess Ilse, who has her home in the rocks of the Ilsestein. The Ilse is mentioned in literary works such as the Die Harzreise by Heinrich Heine.

== See also ==
- List of rivers of Saxony-Anhalt
- List of rivers of Lower Saxony
