= Bernhard Sehring =

German architect

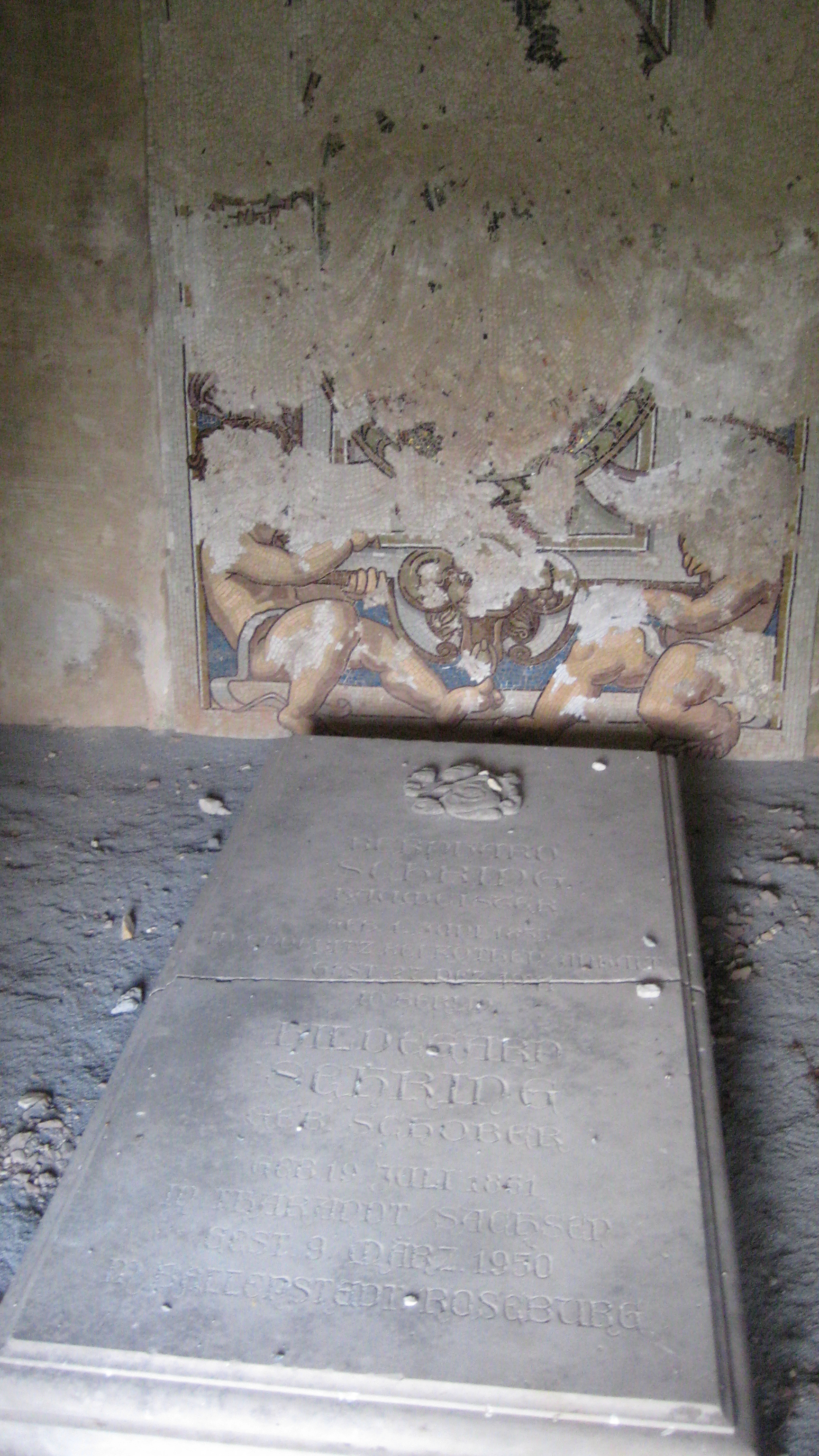
Grave of Bernhard Sehring and his wife Hildegard Sehring née Schober (19 July 1861 in Tharandt – 9 March 1950) in the Roseburg castle

Ernst Bernhard Sehring (1 June 1855 in Edderitz, Anhalt – 27 December 1941) was a German architect.

== Life ==
Sehring came from a petty-bourgeois village background and was the son of a Dessau construction foreman. He was boarded by Professor Happach and attended the Gymnasium and the Kunstschule in Dessau. From 1873 until 1875, he studied at the Technische Universität Braunschweig, then architecture four semesters at the Berlin Bauakademie. During his studies he became a member of the Akademischer Verein Motiv Berlin. In 1877/1878, he was a trainee with the architect Karl Hoene in Halle (Saale). Sehring completed his year of military service as a one-year volunteer in 1878/1879. He undertook a study trip to Italy in 1879/1880 to observe the theatre architecture and garden architecture there.

Shortly after he was accepted into the Architekten- und Ingenieurverein zu Berlin-Brandenburg, he received the Schinkel Prize, his first architectural award, in 1882 for his designs for the Museum Island. In 1883, he received the Großer Akademischer Staatspreis.

As a state scholarship holder in Rome (1883 and 1884), he took part in an international theatre building competition for the first time and opened the architectural firm Peters and Sehring with Ernst Peters in Berlin-Kreuzberg in 1885. In 1889, he terminated this partnership and from 1890 was active as an independent, freelance artist and architect.

Sehring became known for his designs, especially competition designs, theatre and other new buildings. At the Theater des Westens in Berlin-Charlottenburg, he combined an elegant neo-baroque auditorium with a stage tower in the style of a medieval keep. Sehring later adopted a similar combination of disparate styles in the construction of the Stadttheater Halberstadt as well as the Düsseldorfer Schauspielhauses (both in 1905). At first, he even ran the Theater des Westens himself together with his partner Paul Blumenreich as Theater des Westens GmbH; however, the attempt was financially unsuccessful.

From 1907 to 1921, he built his family's summer residence, the Roseburg castle in Ballenstedt (Harz).

== Buildings and drafts ==
- 1889–1890: Künstlerhaus St. Lukas in Berlin, Fasanenstraße 13 (unter Denkmalschutz)
- 1890–1895: Wohnhaus Kantstraße 153 in Berlin-Charlottenburg (erster Wohnsitz von Rudolf Diesel)
- 1891(?): Königin-Luise-Gedächtnishalle in Neustrelitz
- 1892: Mehrfamilienwohnhaus-Paar in Berlin, Carmerstraße 10/11
- 1895–1896: Theater des Westens in Berlin-Charlottenburg, Kantstraße
- 1895–1896: Westtürme der St. Jakob, Köthen in Köthen (Anhalt)
- 1895–1896: Theater „Alt-Berlin“ auf der Berliner Gewerbeausstellung 1896 in Berlin-Treptow (abgebrochen 1897)
- 1899–1900: Fassade des Warenhauses der H. & C. Tietz AG in Berlin, Leipziger Straße 46–49 (im Zweiten Weltkrieg zerstört)
- 1901: Walpurgishalle auf dem Hexentanzplatz bei Thale (Harz)
- 1902–1904: Stadttheater in Bielefeld, Niederwall 27 (innen 1937 verändert, 2004–2006 denkmalgerecht saniert)
- 1903–1904: Villa Löwenpalais in Berlin-Grunewald, Koenigsallee 30/32 (unter Denkmalschutz)
- 1904–1905: Schauspielhaus in Düsseldorf, Kasernenstraße (im Zweiten Weltkrieg zerstört)
- 1904–1905: Stadttheater in Halberstadt (im Zweiten Weltkrieg zerstört)
- 1905: Bismarck-Brunnen in Breslau, Schlossplatz / Königsplatz
- 1906–1910: Stadthalle / Musikhalle in Görlitz, Am Stadtpark 1
- 1907–1908: Stadttheater (heutiges Staatstheater) in Cottbus, Schillerplatz
- 1907–1920: Roseburg castle in Ballenstedt, Sehrings Sommersitz
- before 1914: Expansion of Reisen castle
- before 1914: Reconstruction of the Berlin Wintergarten theatre in Berlin, Friedrichstraße
- 1927–1928: Kino Delphi-Palast in Berlin-Charlottenburg, Kantstraße / Fasanenstraße (Heavily damaged in the Second World War, façade and garden design reconstructed)
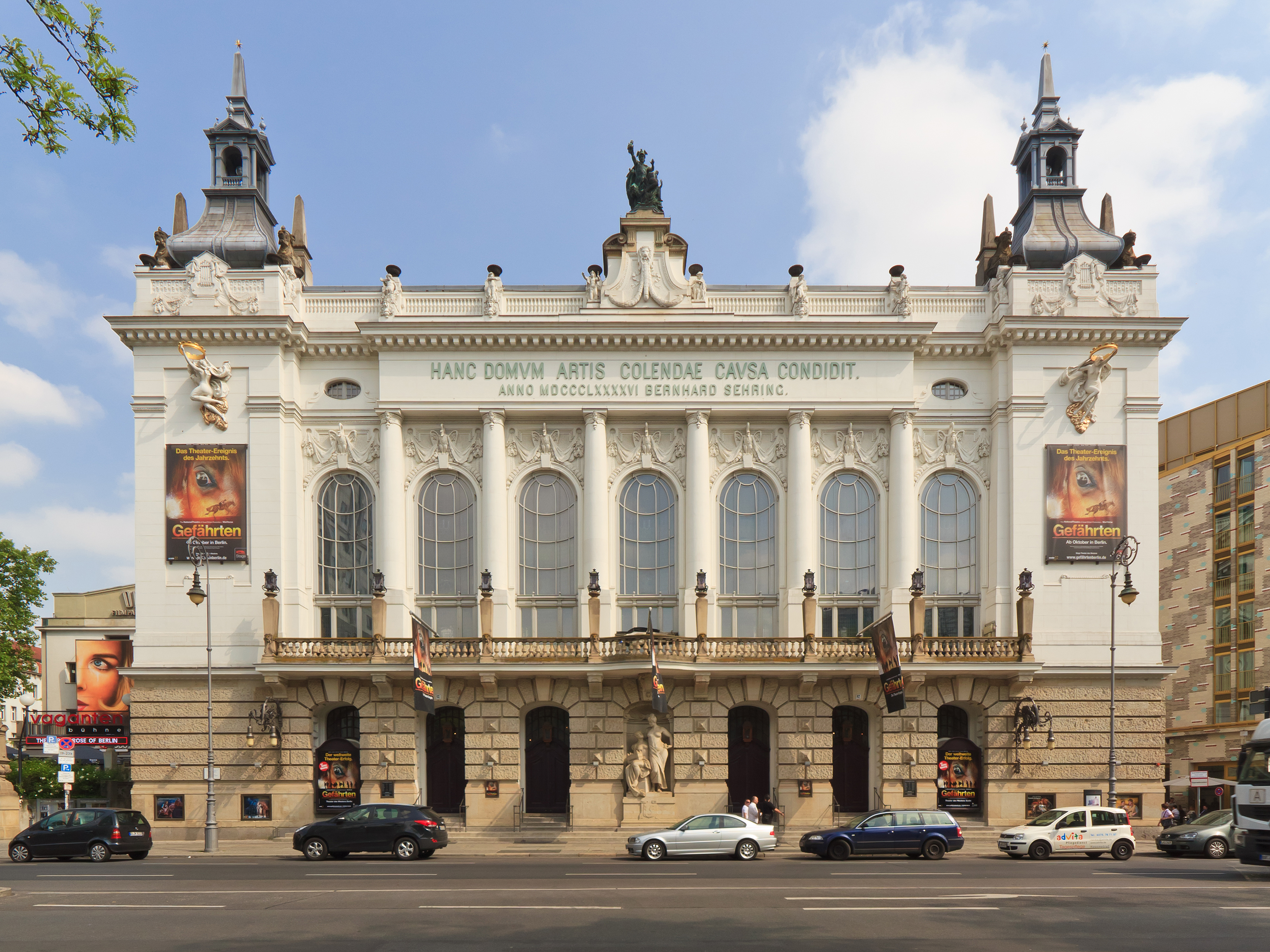
Theater des Westens in Berlin

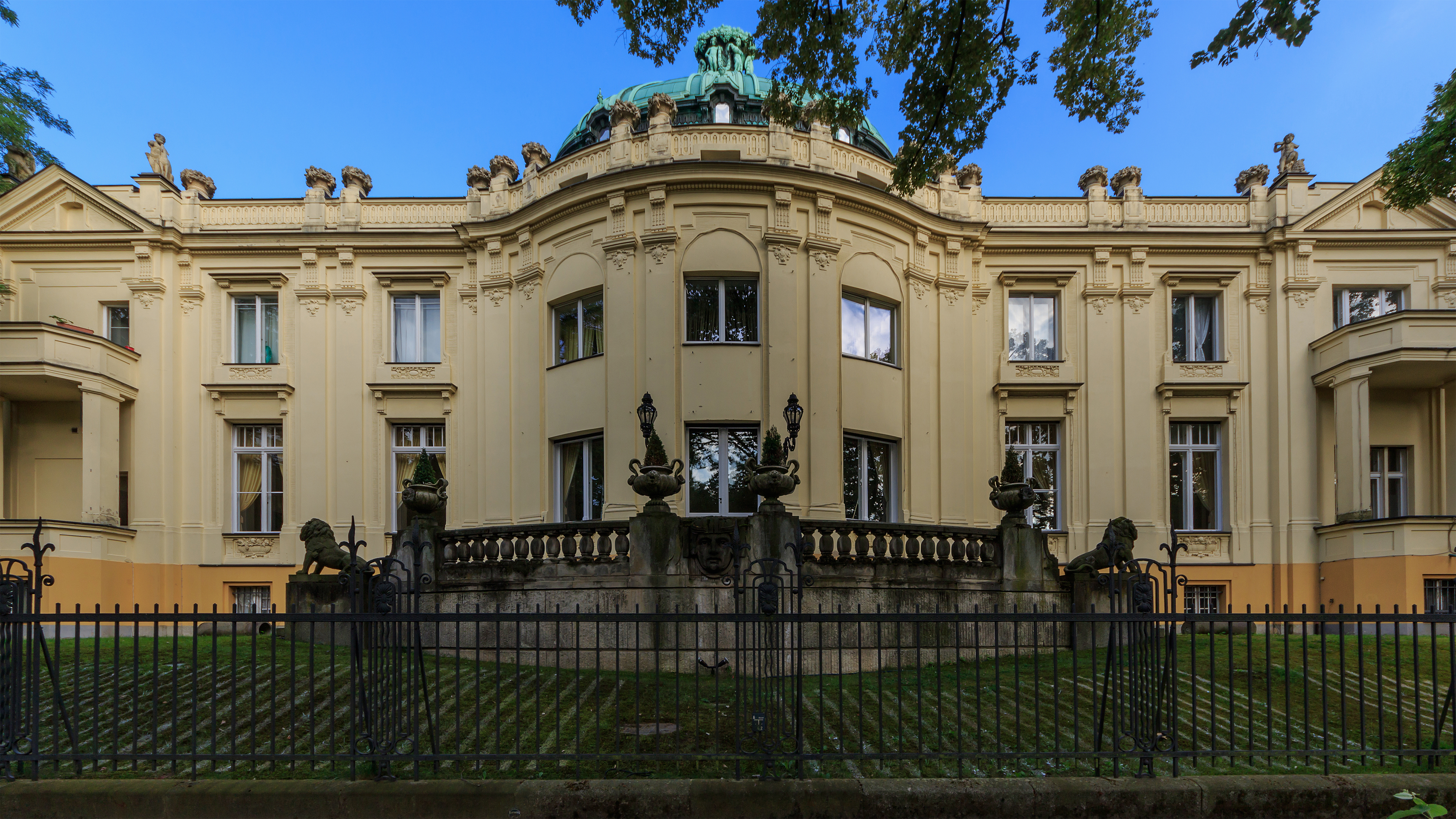
Löwenpalais in Berlin

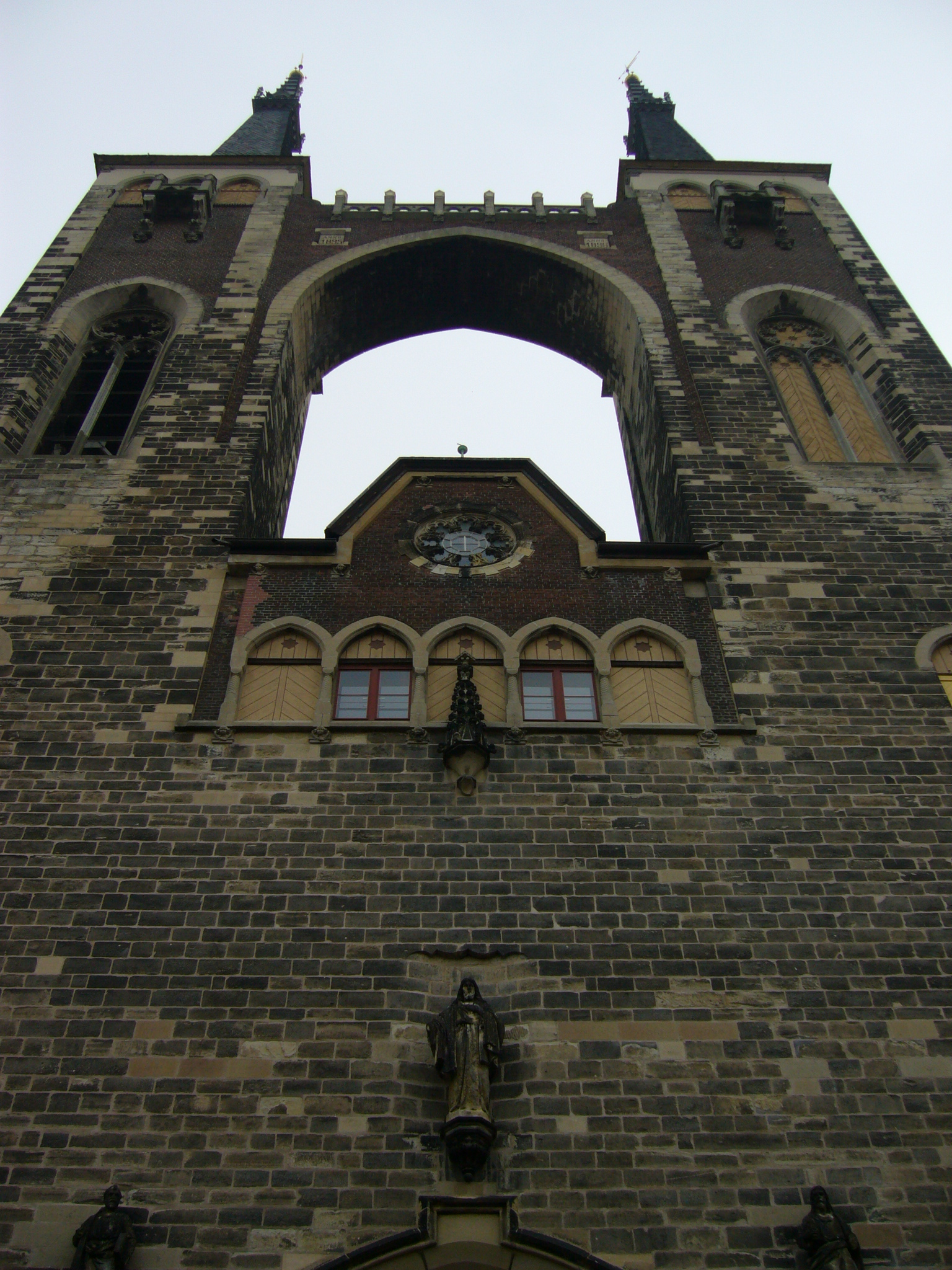
West towers of St. Jakob in Köthen

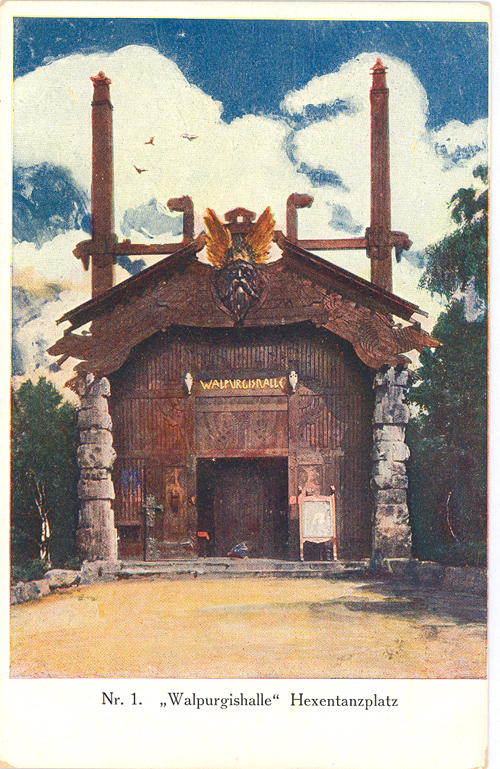
Walpurgishalle (historical coloured postcard)

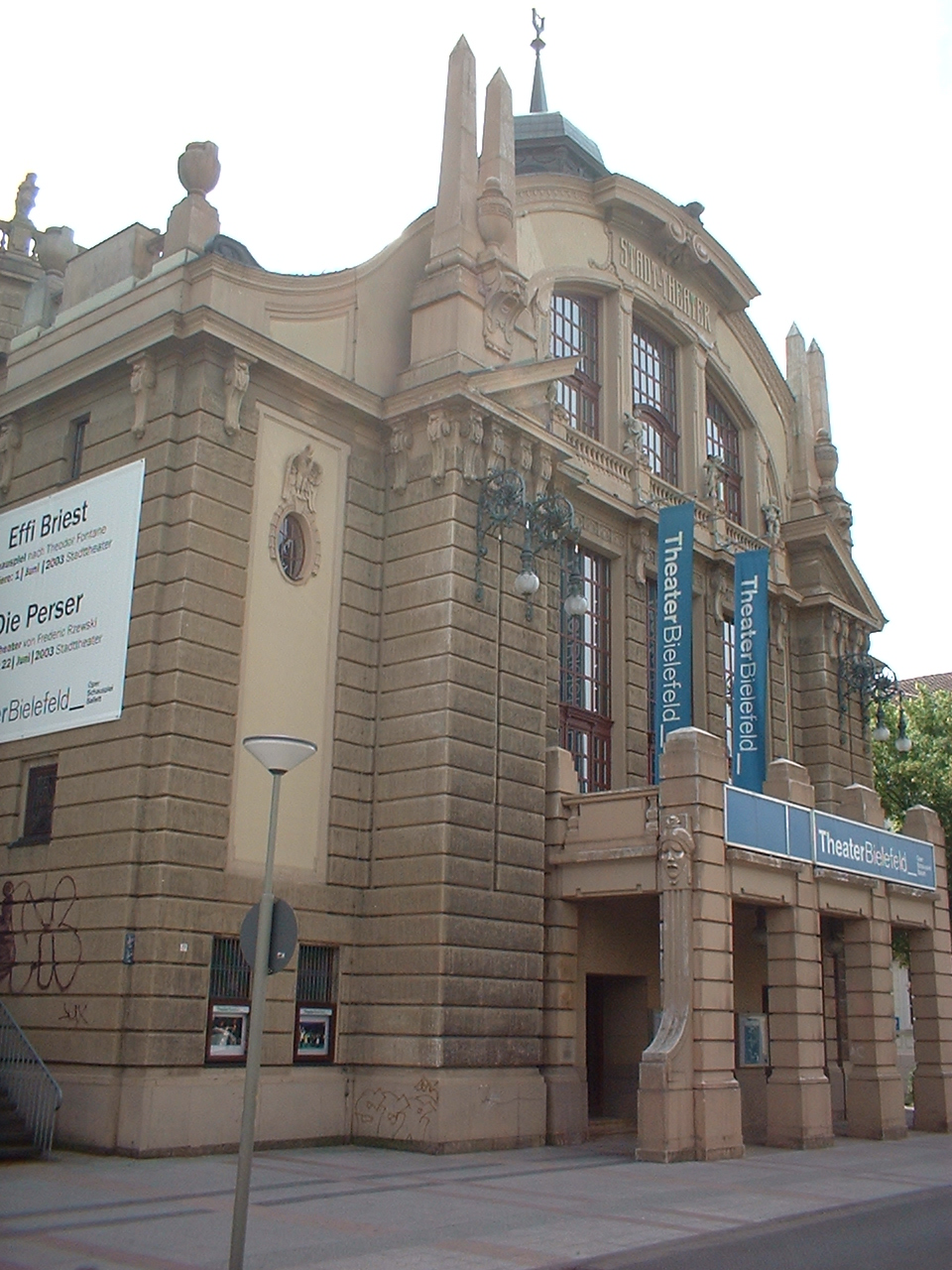
Stadttheater Bielefeld

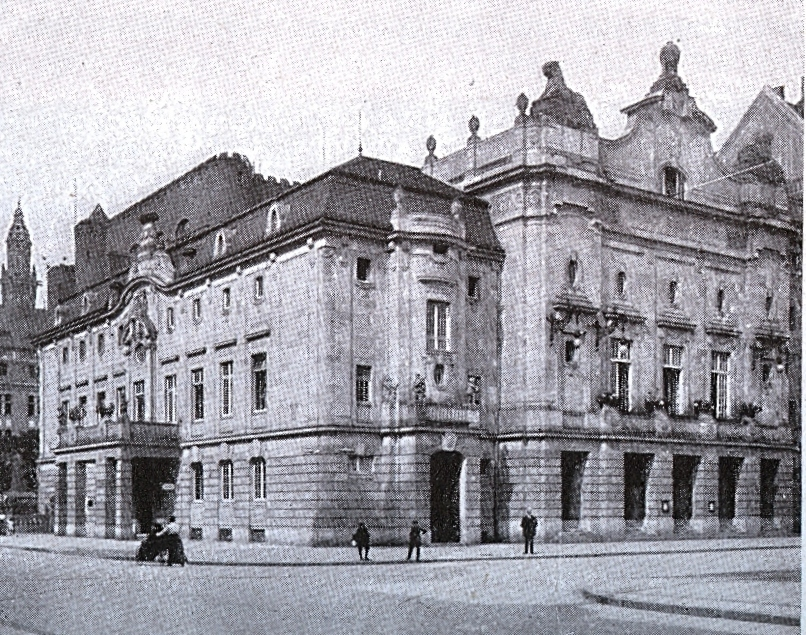
Schauspielhaus Düsseldorf

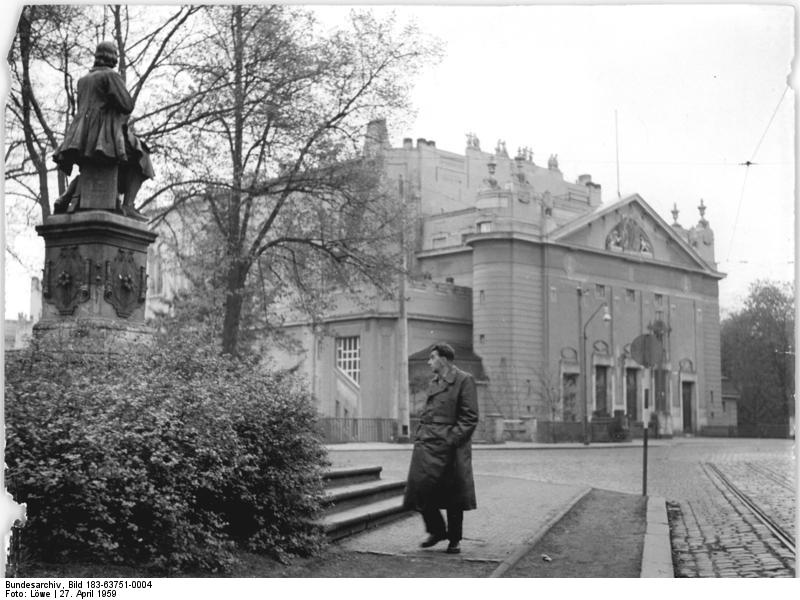
Stadthalle Görlitz (as of 1959)

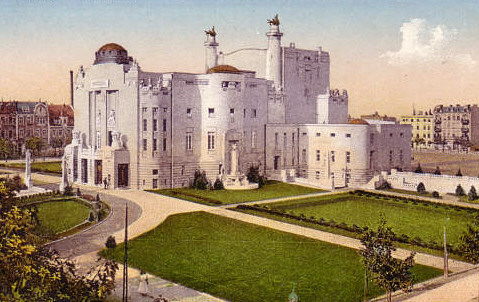
Staatstheater Cottbus (historical coloured postcard)

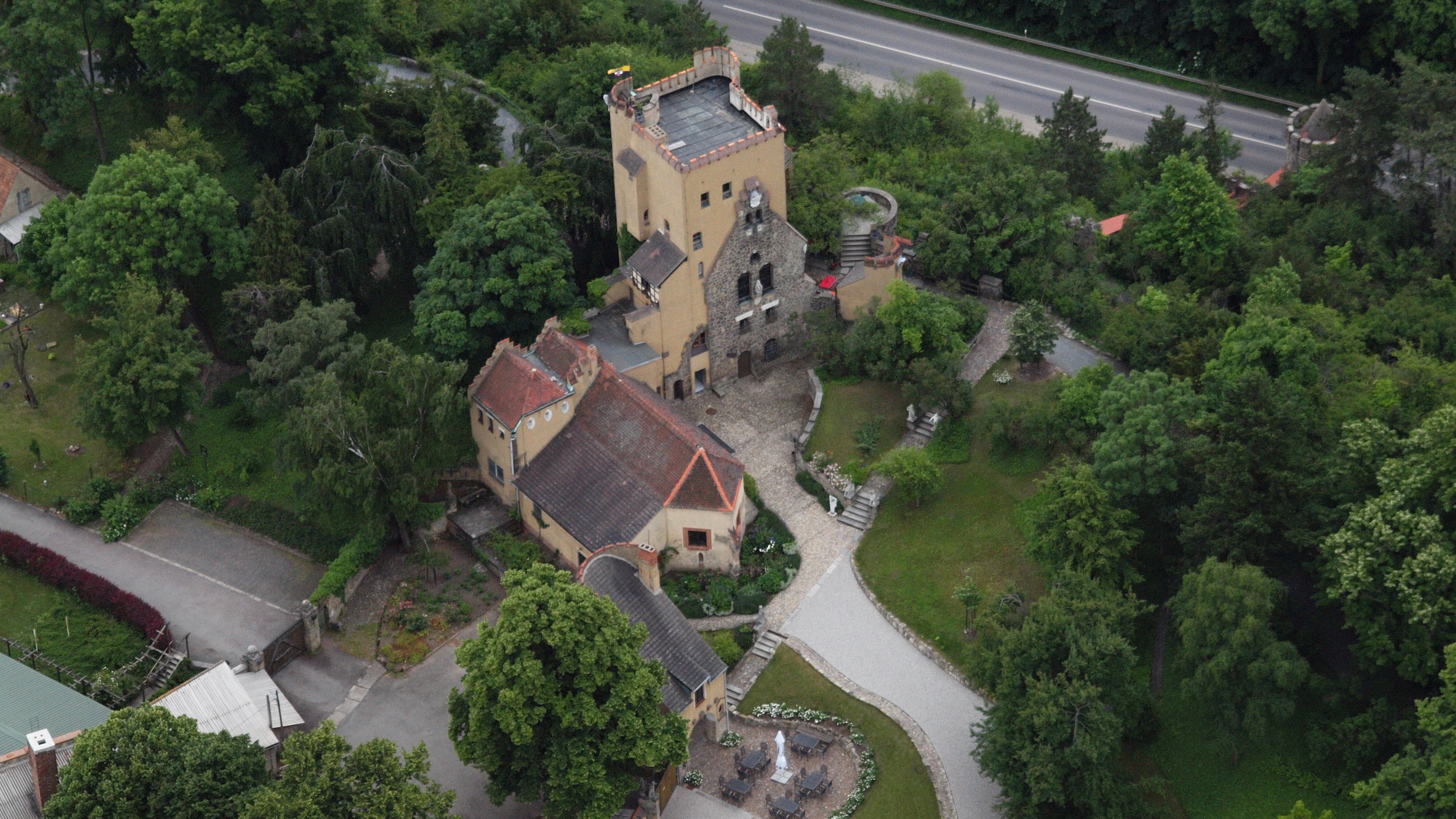
Ballenstedt, Roseburg
