= Hermann Hendrich =

German painter

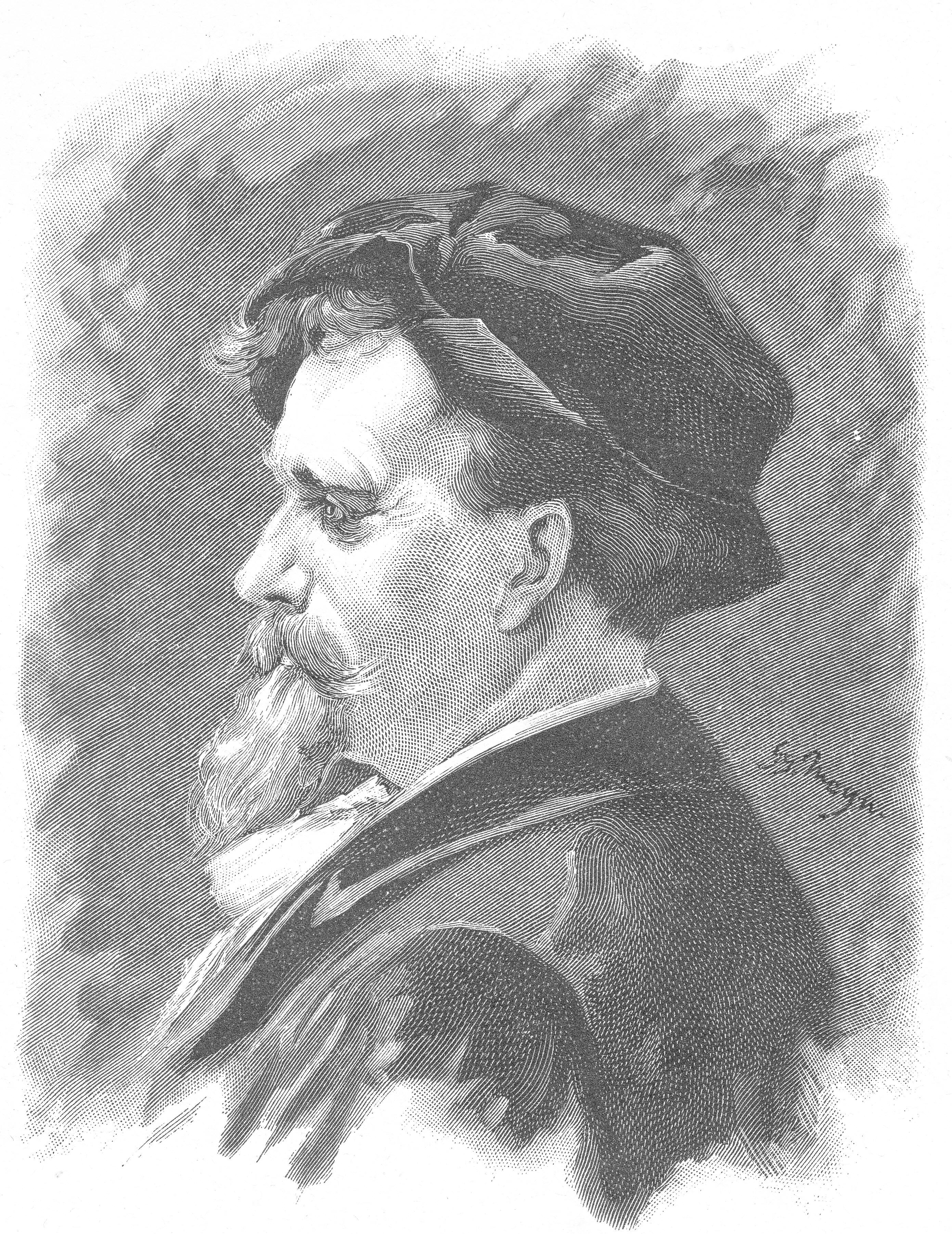
- Born: 31 October 1854; Heringen
- Died: 18 July 1931 (aged 76); Szklarska Poręba
- Known for: Painting, illustrations
- Movement: Neo-romanticism

Hermann Hendrich (31 October 1854 in Heringen, Thuringia – 18 July 1931 in Schreiberhau in Niederschlesien) was a German painter.

== Life ==
Hermann Hendrich was born in the vicinity of the storied Kyffhäuser, his parents were Auguste Friederike Hendrich née Ziegler and the baker August Hendrich. From 1870 to 1872 he served his apprenticeship as lithographer; one year shorter than the regular duration due to his evident talent. He then started a job in a Hanoverian lamp factory where he had to draw a catalogue. At that time, he first attended a Wagnerian opera, Tannhäuser, and the wish emerged to be able to draw such musical impressions.

In 1875, Hendrich attended a job at a Berlin art institution where he had to lithograph oil paintings. In 1876, he visited Norway for further art studies. The jury of the "Grosse Berliner Kunstausstellung" (great Berlin art exhibition) disapproved however the exhibition of his paintings. Hendrich then started a job as painter in Amsterdam. In 1882, he married Clara (Kläre) Becker which he met there. On their honeymoon trip they visited Hendrich's brother in Auburn, New York. Here, he exhibited for the first time his paintings. After some initial sales, the remaining entire amount of pictures was bought by a single art dealer. Using the earned money Hendrich then made a study trip through the USA.

To further deepen his education, in 1885 he went back to Germany. He started lessons by Professor Wenglein in Munich, but then moved to Berlin, and made a study trip to Norway. In 1886, Hendrich entered a studio of the Berlin Academy of Art and received a stipend from the Prussion Ministry of Education and Arts. His paintings were firstly exhibited in Germany.

In 1889, the German Emperor Wilhelm II bought a picture from Hendrich, a highlight for his recognition.

His paintings "Einsiedelei", "Todesmahnen", "Das zweite Gesicht" and "Norwegischer Bergsee" have been shown during the "II. International Exhibition of Watercolors, Pastels, Drawings, and Etchings in Dresden" from 10 August to 25 September 1890.

In 1901, the "Walpurgishalle" in Thale, a building in a pseudo old-Germanic style was inaugurated. Hendrich did the paintings in the interior and created sketches that were used by Bernhard Sehring to create the architecture. Hendrich considered this as climax of his work.

In Schreiberhau, 1903 Henrich erected the "Sagenhalle", inspired by the "Walpurgishalle".

Hendrich was a co-founder of the Werdandibund in 1905, a society against the modern developments of art, considered as decadent.

In 1910, the title professor was awarded to Hendrich.

The "Nibelungenhalle" at the Drachenfels was opened in 1913 on the occasion of Richard Wagner's centenary. It contains twelve paintings by Hendrich with scenes from Der Ring des Nibelungen.

In 1921, he published illustrations for an edition of Das Märchen (also known as The Green Snake and the Beautiful Lily), a 1795 story written by Johann Wolfgang von Goethe.

In 1926, the "Halle Deutscher Sagenring" in Burg an der Wupper (today part of Solingen) with Hendrich's paintings from the Percival saga was opened.

Hendrich died 1931 in Schreiberhau in an accident at the age of 76.

== Gallery ==
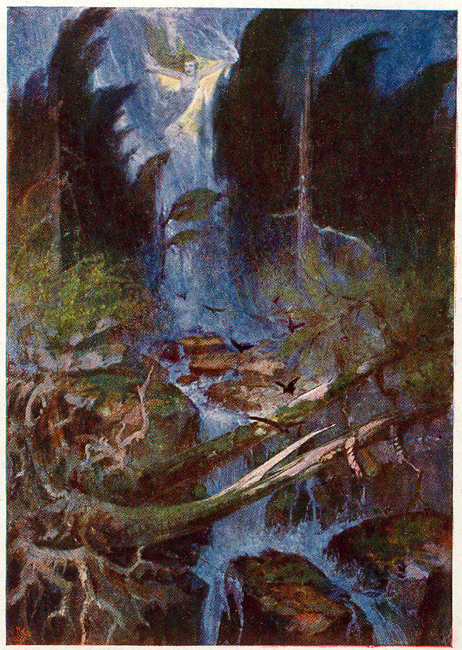
Windsbraut (Bride of the Wind), 1901

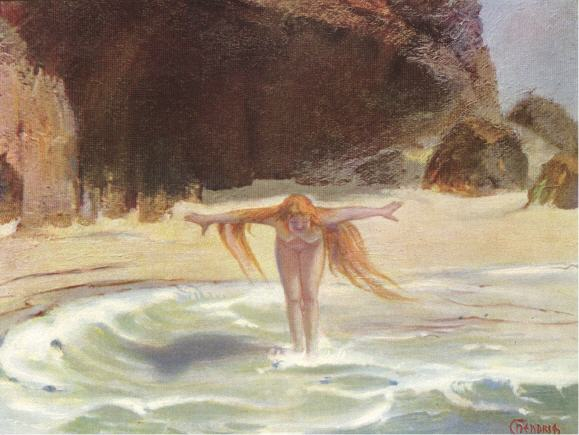
Die Meerfrau (The Mermaid), 1908

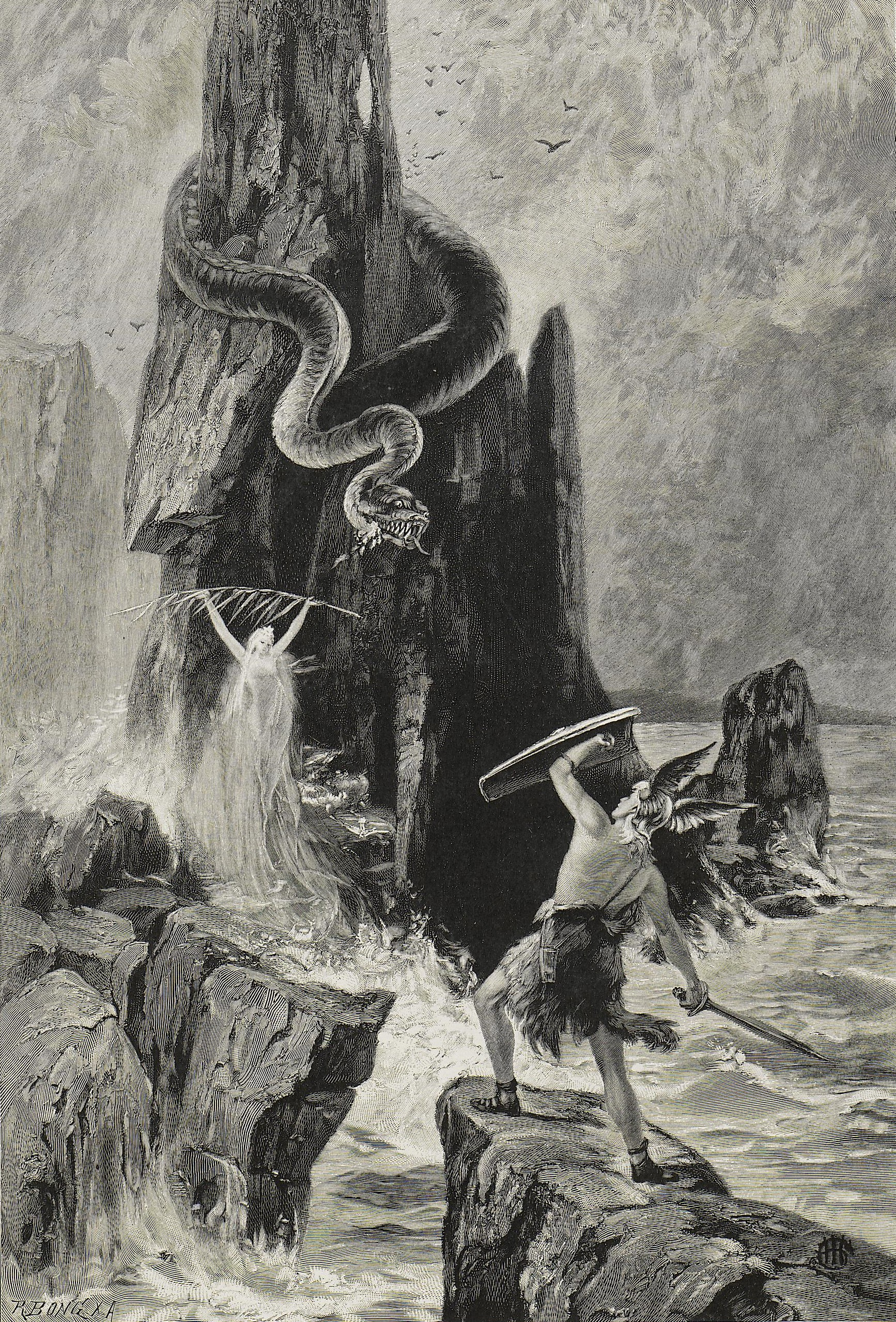
Der Kampf um den Ruhm, 1895

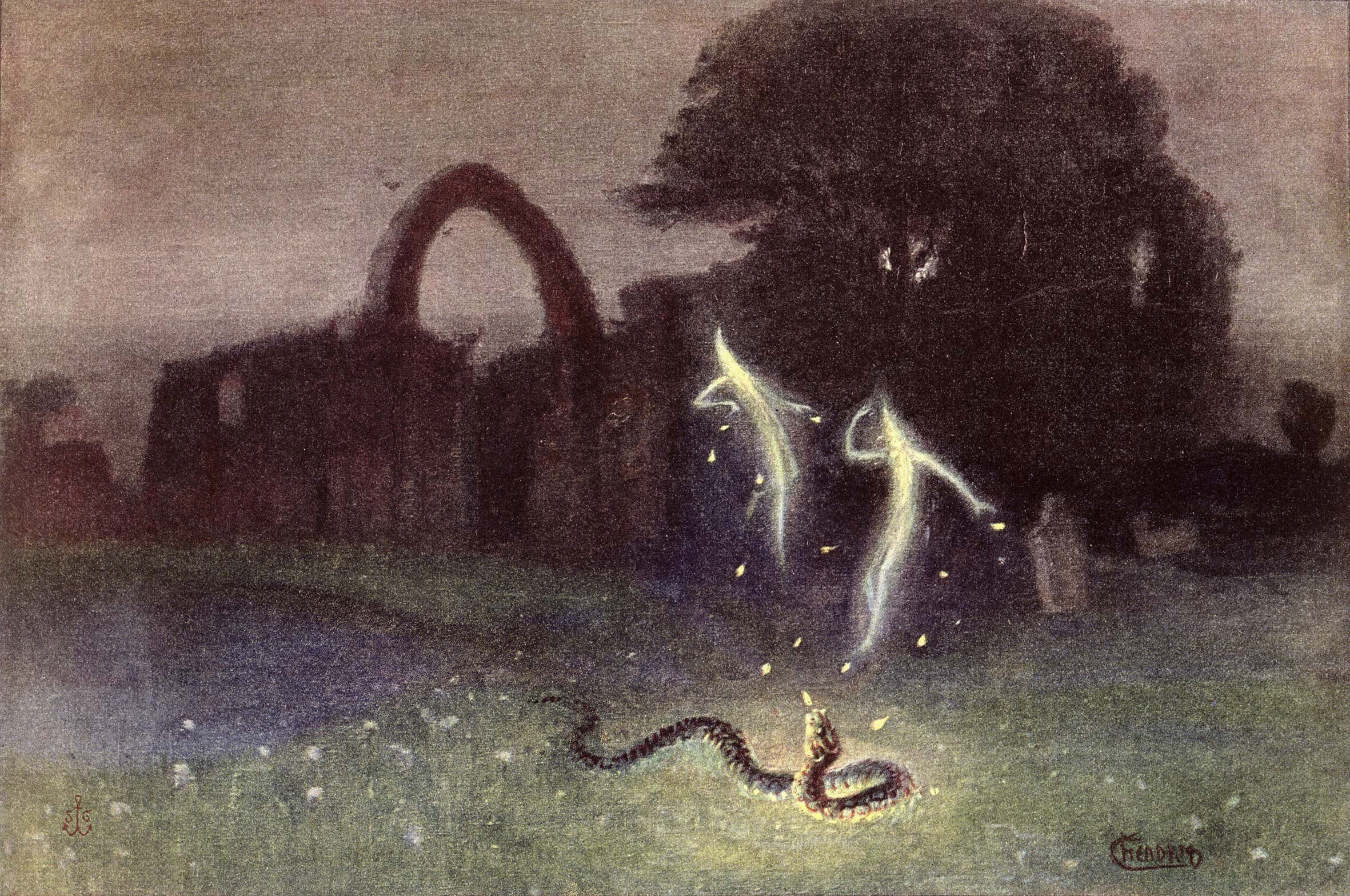
Will-o-the-wisp and snake

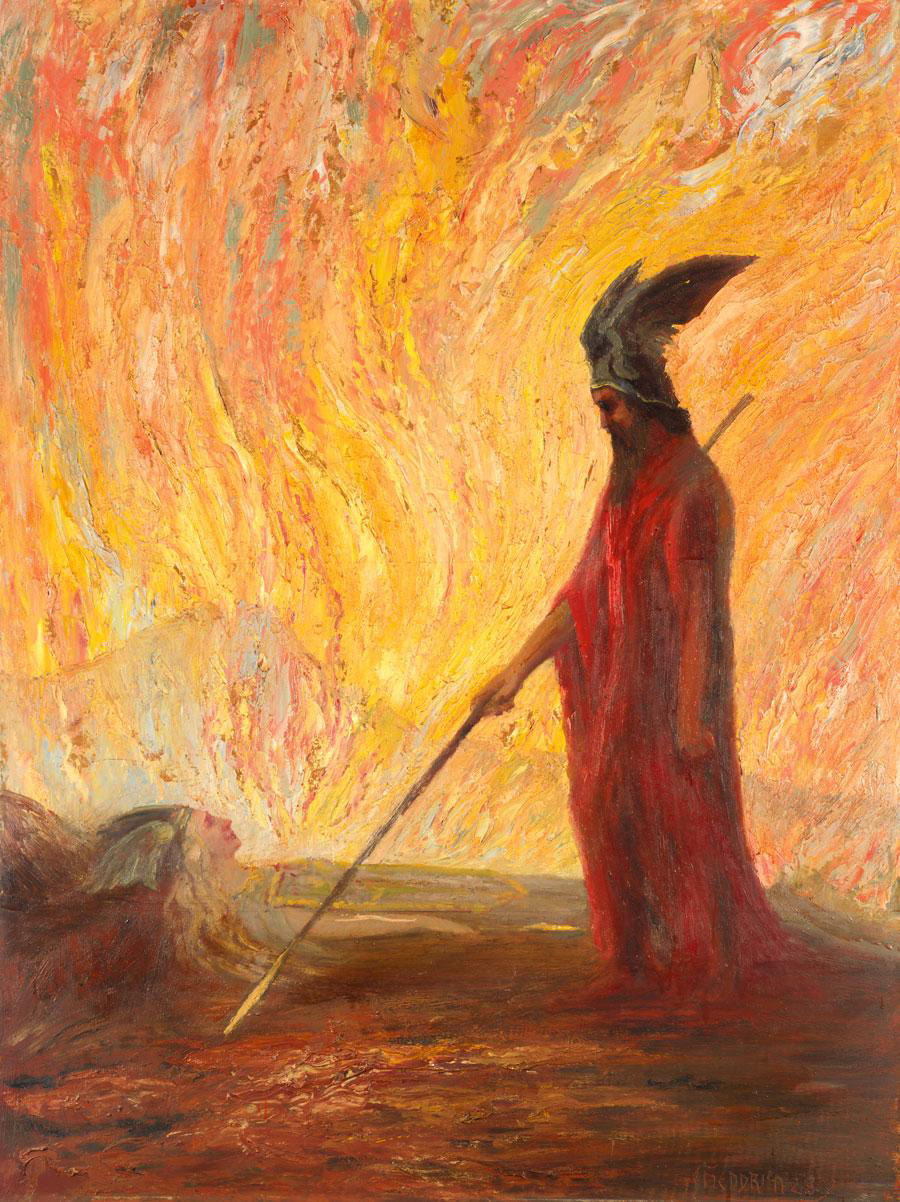
Scene from Wagner's Ring, 1928

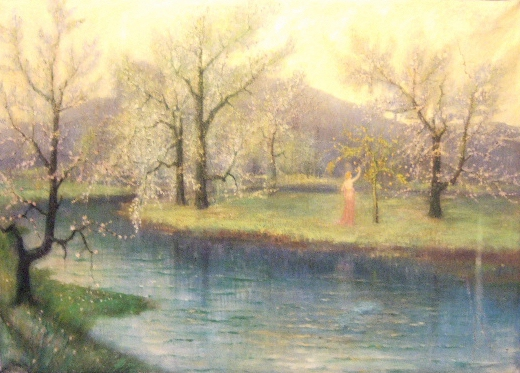
Freyja's Garden, illustration for Das Rheingold

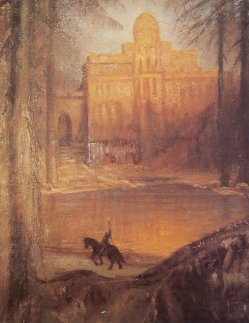
Parsifal

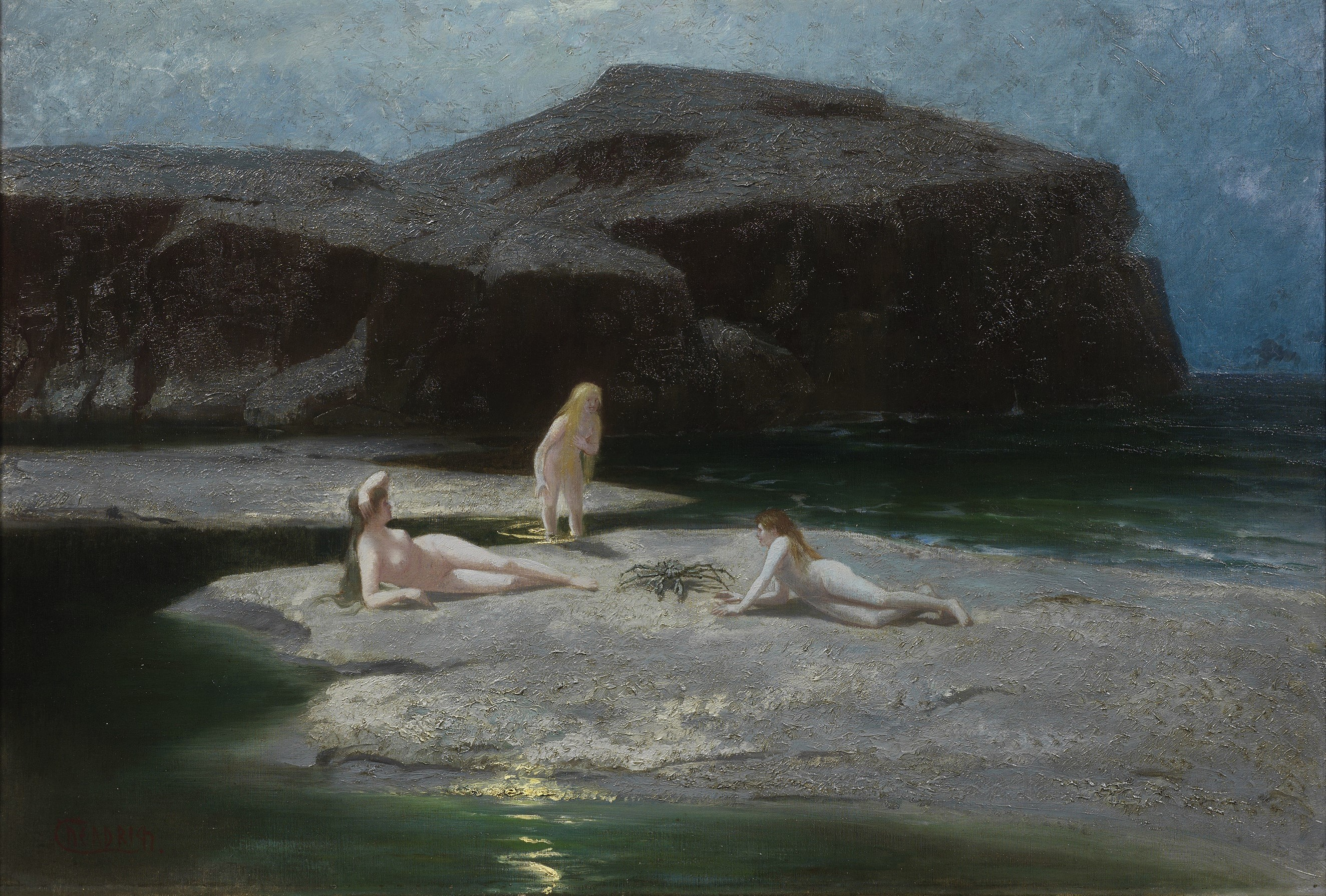
Mondnacht am Meer (Moon-night at sea)

== Literature ==
- Elke Rohling (editor) Hermann Hendrich Leben und Werk Life and Work: self-published "Werdandi" (bilingual German/English) ISBN 3-00-008228-X
