= Sachsenwall =

The Sachsenwall (German for "Saxon rampart, "Saxon wall or "Saxon embankment") may refer to:

- the remains of a more-than-1500-year-old granite wall on the Hexentanzplatz near Thale in the Harz Mountains of Germany.
- the Limes Saxoniae, a Saxon defensive dyke in Schleswig Holstein, North Germany
- a former rampart system around Marienburg Castle in Lower Saxony, North Germany
