= Hubertus Spring =

Coordinates: 51°44′32″N 11°01′40″E

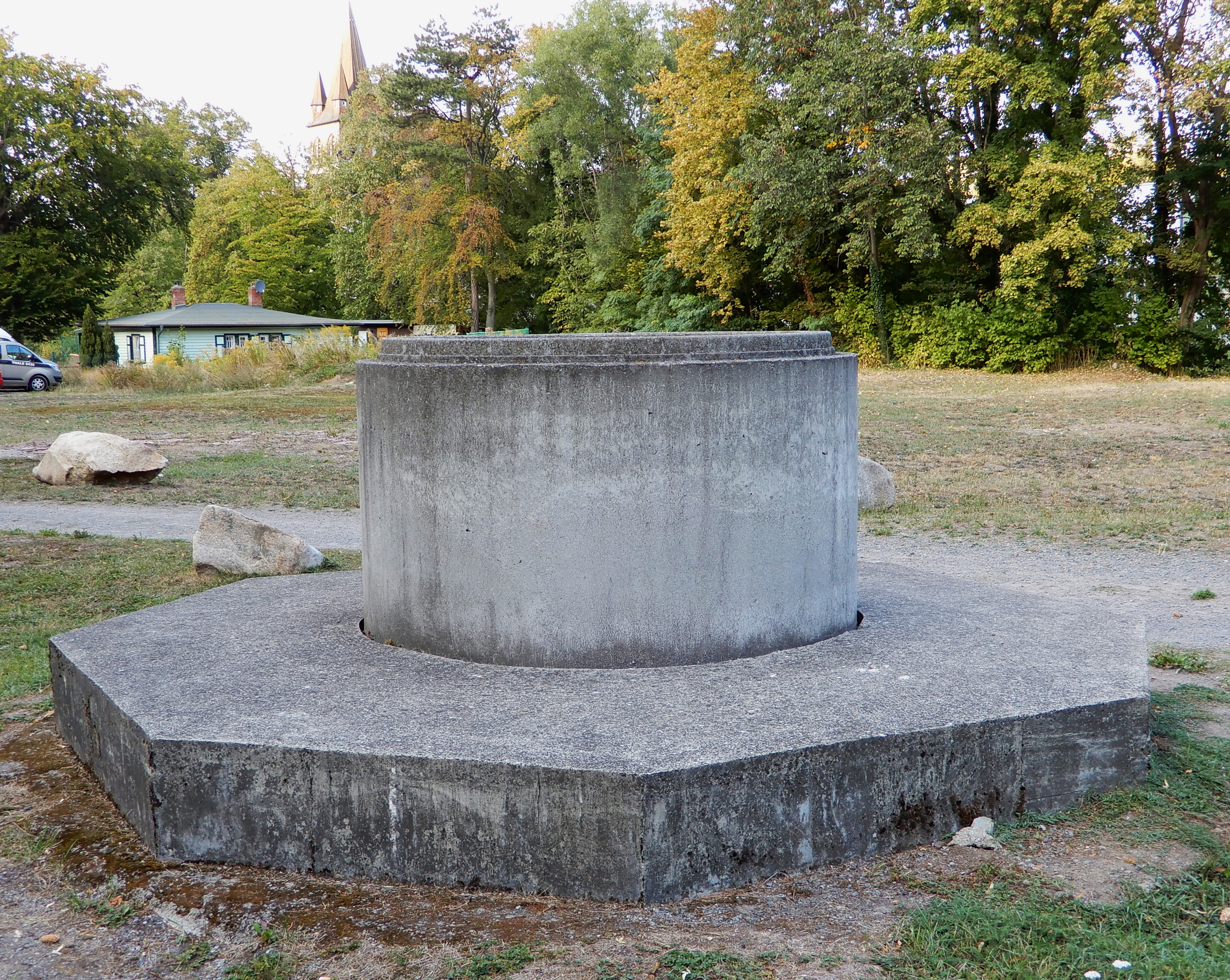
The old Hubertus fountain

The Hubertus Spring (German: Hubertusquelle) is a "healing spring" (Heilquelle) in the Harz Mountains of central Germany whose waters contain radon. It rises on Hubertus Island (Hubertusinsel or Große Salzstrominsel), which is about 2 hectares in area, near Thale, immediately at the exit of the River Bode from the Harz Mountains. It has been well known for about 500 years and, according to oral tradition, was first noticed by foresters and hunters, because roe deer satisfied their hunger for salt here.

== History ==
The first recorded mention of the spring was in 1584. That year the local landlord, Count Martin of Regenstein, granted the right to Augsburg citizens and a Sudmeister ("brine master"), Balthasar Becker, to establish a saltworks on the site of the former Hubertus Baths. However, a combination of annual flooding and ice on the River Bode periodically damaged the works. As a result, salt production in the old parish (Gemarkung) of Behrensdorf (the territory between the present-day Wolfsburgstrasse and Roßtrappenstrasse) was moved and the brine was transported to the new site over wooden pipes. This saltworks initially prospered, but deteriorated after the death of Sudmeister Becker (he was sentenced to death in Blankenburg, because he had killed a smelter in the course of a dispute) and the brine remained untapped.
