= Walpurgis Hall =

Hall on the Witches' Dance Floor plateau in the Harz mountains, Germany

Coordinates: 51°43′57.8″N 11°1′33.9″E

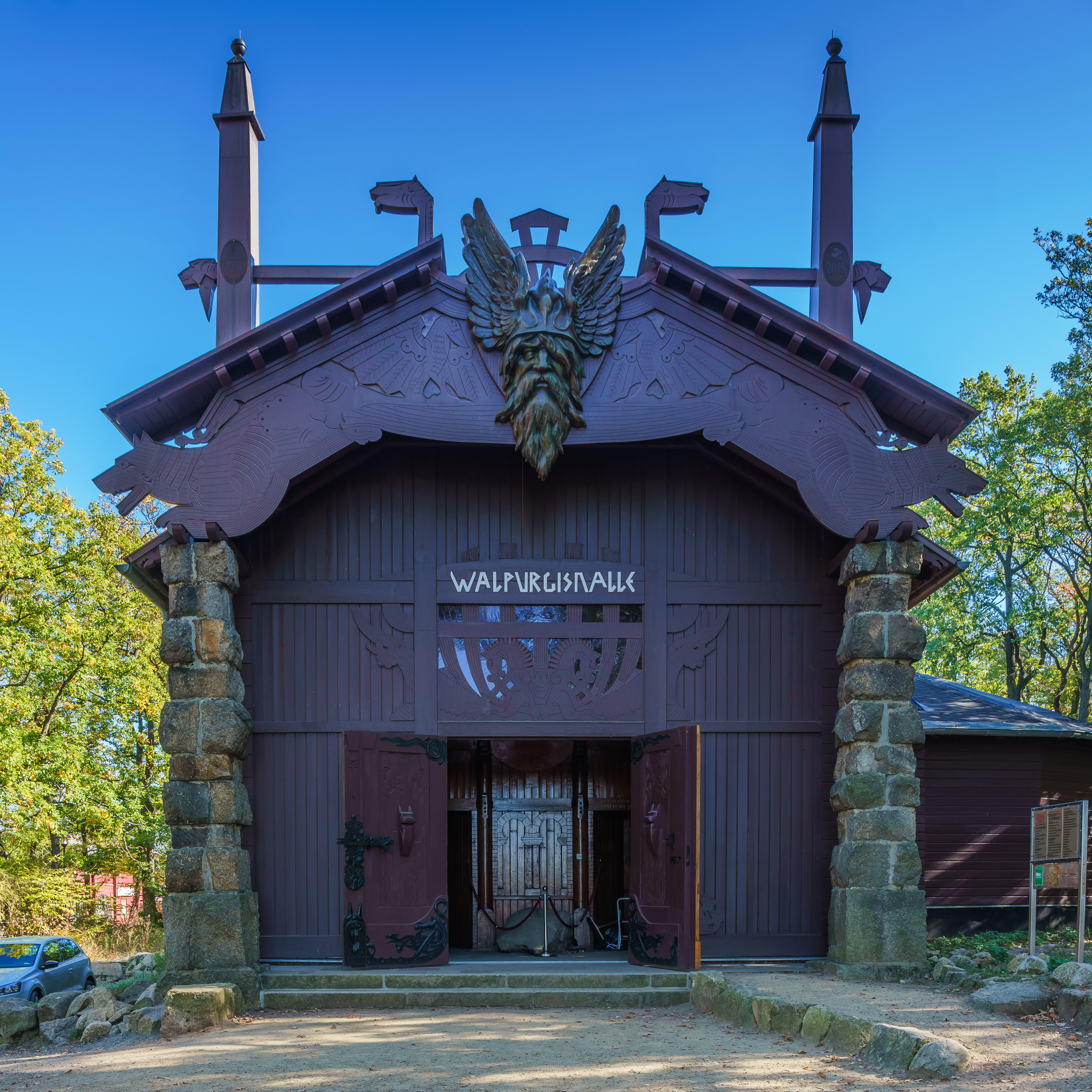
Walpurgis Hall (2018)

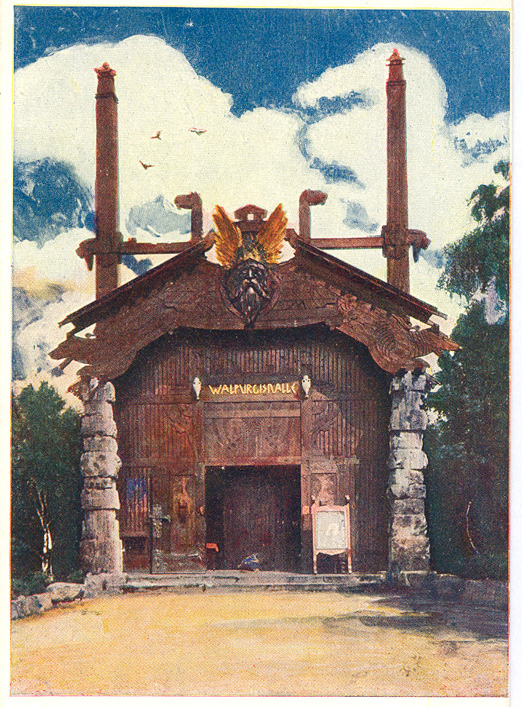
Walpurgis Hall: Witches' Dance Floor (painting by Hermann Hendrich)

The Walpurgis Hall (German: Walpurgishalle) is a hall on the Witches' Dance Floor near Thale in the Harz mountains, Germany, built in the Old Germanic style by Hermann Hendrich and Bernhard Sehring. The hall was opened in 1901 and is a museum today. Whilst Sehring designed the architecture of the building to Hendrich's guidelines, Hendrich himself was responsible for the five large paintings in the interior of the hall. These portray scenes of the Walpurgis Night from Goethe's Faust known as the: Will-o'-the-Wisp Dance, Mammon's Cave, Witches' Dance, Bride of the Wind und Gretchen's Appearance (Gretchen's Tragedy).

== Paintings ==
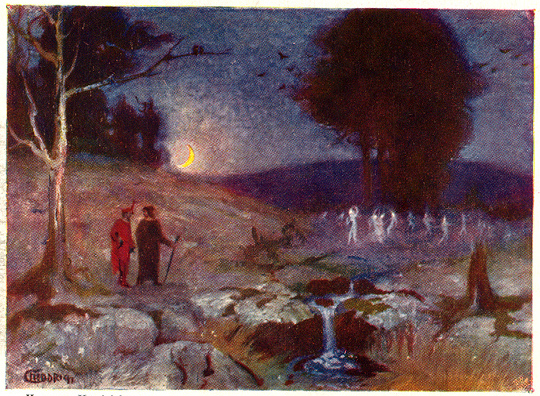
Will-o'-the-Wisp Dance

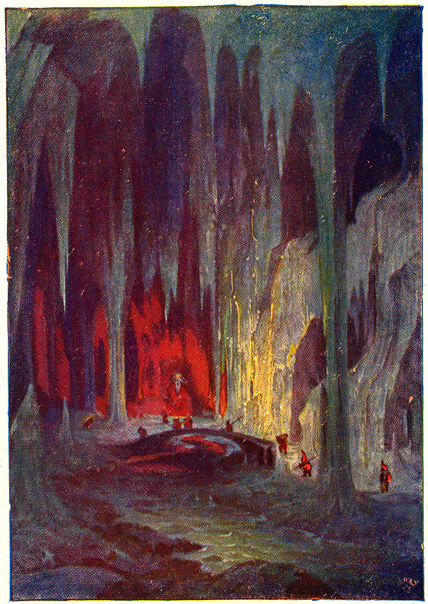
Mammon's Cave

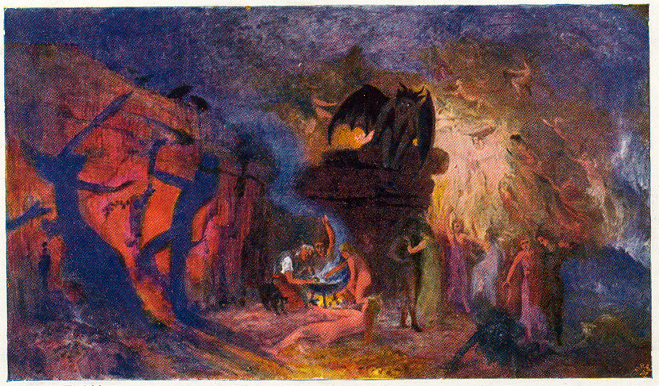
Witches' Dance

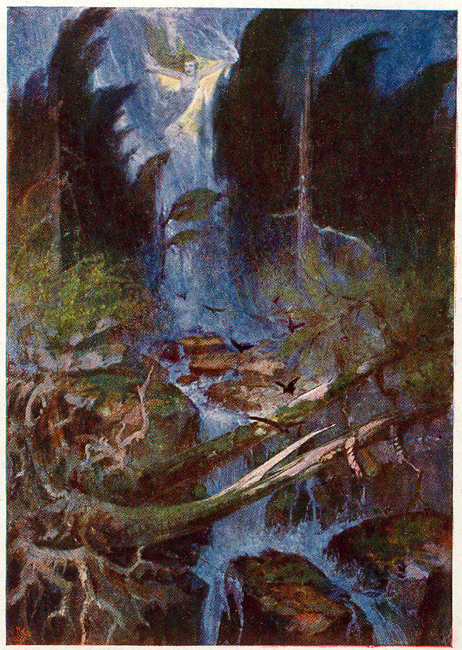
Bride of the Wind

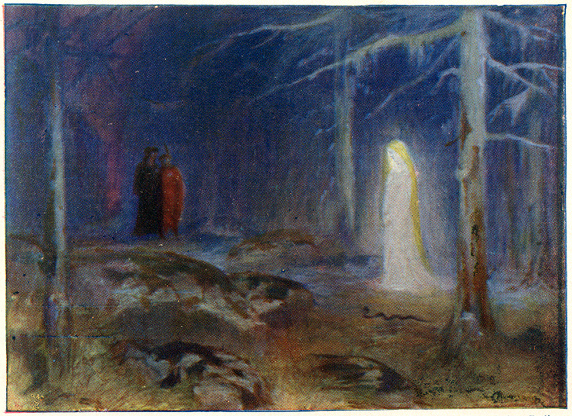
Gretchen's Appearance
