= Staatstheater Cottbus =

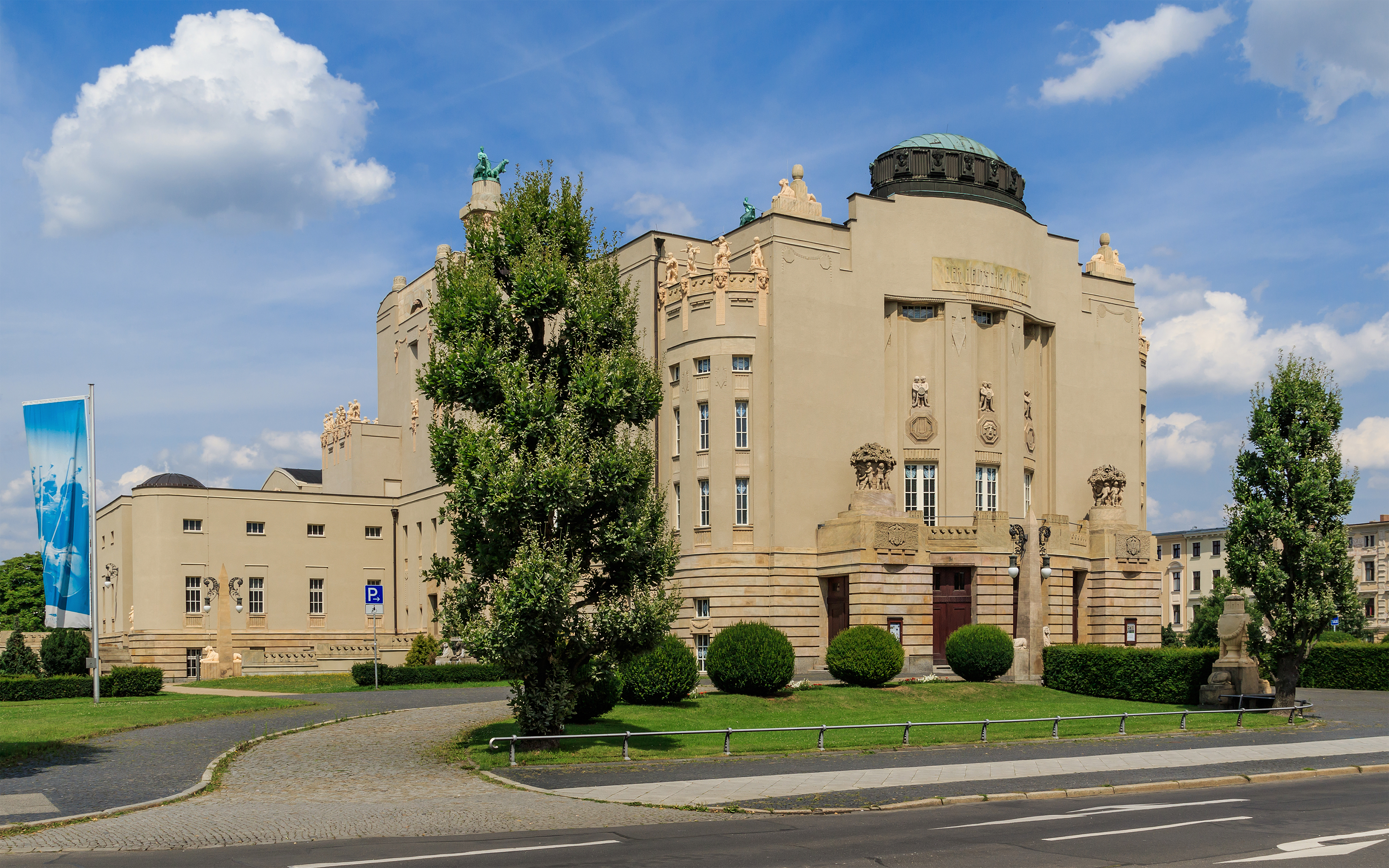
- Staatstheater Cottbus in 2017
- Former names: Stadttheater Cottbus

General information
- Location: Cottbus, Brandenburg, Germany
- Coordinates: 51°45′26″N 14°19′32″E
- Completed: 1906

Design and construction
- Architect(s): Bernhard Sehring

Website
- www.staatstheater-cottbus.de

The Staatstheater Cottbus is the only state theatre of the German federal state of Brandenburg in Cottbus. It has its own ensemble presenting plays, operas, operettas, musicals, orchestral concerts and ballet. The theatre had more than 130.000 spectators in 2013.

== History ==
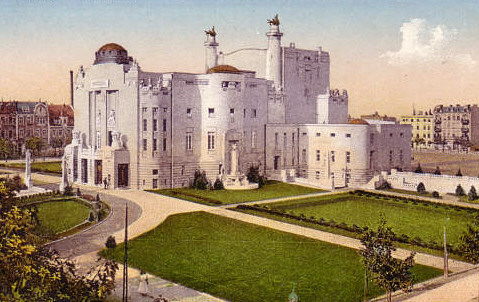
Großes Haus, c. 1916

The theatre was built on demand by the citizens of Cottbus, a town flourishing around 1900 due to textile industry. The town assembly decided on 1 November 1905 to build a municipal theatre (Stadttheater) and held a competition. The commission was given to Bernhard Sehring, who had built the 1896 Theater des Westens in Berlin. In the Cottbus building, he combined architecture, crafts, painting and sculpture in Jugendstil.

The theatre was built in only 16 months, and opened on 1 October 1908 with a performance of Lessing's Minna von Barnhelm. The first Intendant, Max Berg-Ehlert, established to present a month of operas at the end of a season, because the theatre had no opera ensemble yet. From 1912, the new director Otto Maurenbrecher established an orchestra and opera ensemble. In 1992, the management of the theatre went from the town of Cottbus to the state. Christoph Schroth became Intendant in 1993.

== Film ==
- So ein Theater! 100 Jahre Theater Cottbus, documentary, 45 min, moderation: Uwe Kockisch, production: rbb, first aired on 1 October 2008
