= Homburg Watchtower =

Observation tower on the site of a Germanic refuge castle (Fliehburg) in Germany

Coordinates: 51°44′18″N 11°01′55″E

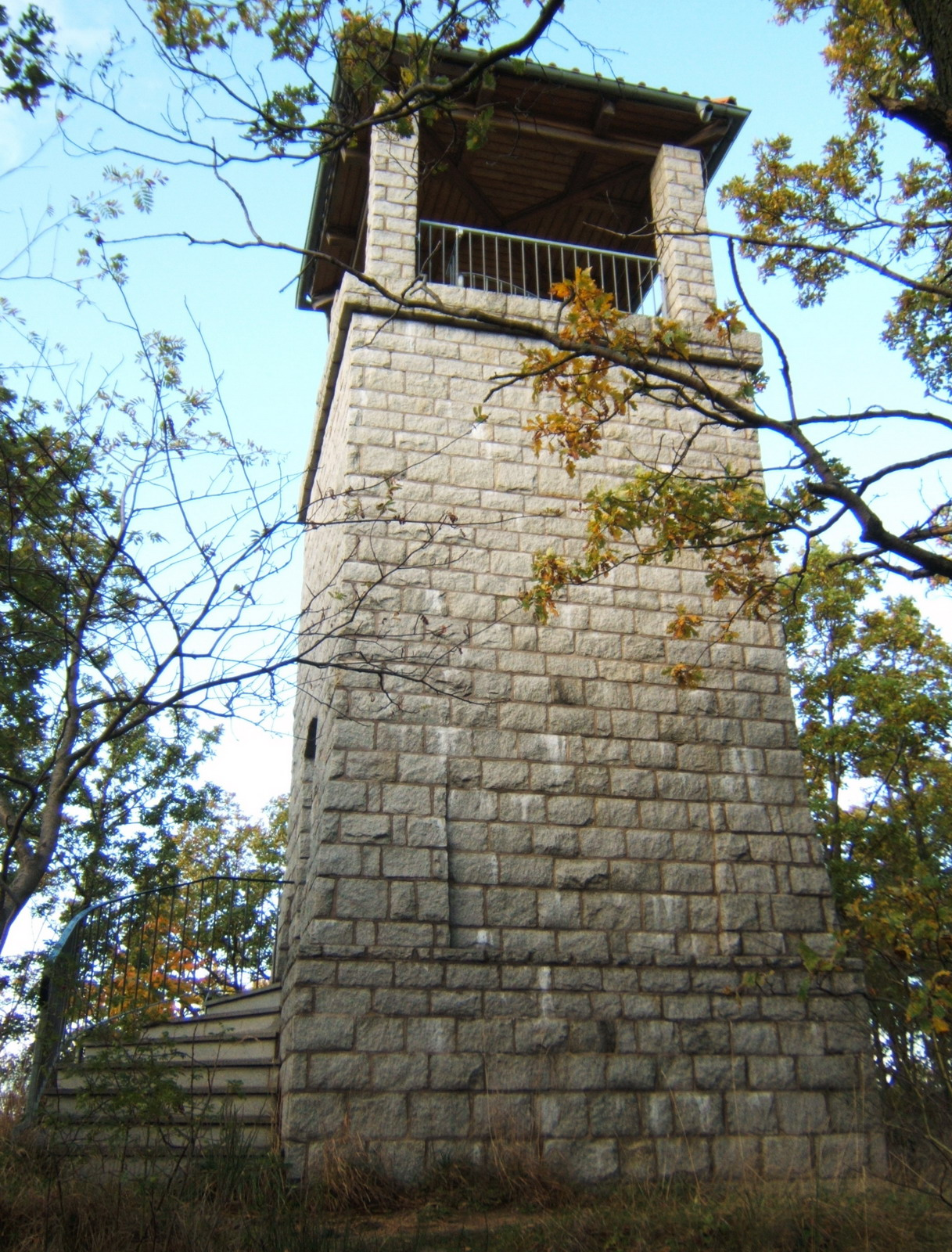
The Homburg Watchtower

The Homburg Watchtower (German: Homburgswarte) is an observation tower on the site of a Germanic refuge castle (Fliehburg) near the Hexentanzplatz above the town of Thale in the Harz Mountains of central Germany.

== Location ==
The Sachsenwall Way (Sachsenwallweg) runs through open oak woods to the Homburg Watchtower about 250 m northeast of the Harz Mountain Theatre on the Hexentanzplatz. It is sited on the terrain of an old castle, the Homburg.

== History ==
The Homburg – like the Winzenburg on the Rosstrappe on the other side of the gorge – acted as a refuge castle for Germanic tribes. It was built between 750 and 450 B. C. and was protected by the rampart system and the Sachsenwall (Note: The Sachsenwall referred to here is not the Limes Saxoniae, but the remains of a more-than-1500-year-old granite wall on the Hexentanzplatz) in the immediate vicinity. In the southern part of the rampart system is a gap with a ditch in front of it; behind the eastern rampart is a walkway-like inner ditch.

It appears that clandestine Germanic customs and rituals may have been practised here in the period following Christianisation, as indicated, for example, by the discovery of a sacrifice stone with a swastika in 1901.

In 1901, the Harz Club built an observation tower, which fell into disrepair and could no longer be accessed after the Second World War. The tower was rebuilt in 1993 and is now open to the public.

== Views ==
The view to the south and east is restricted due to the low height of the tower. Towards the west, however, the vista opens up over the Bode Gorge as far as the Brocken. Ton the north the towns of Blankenburg, Halberstadt and Quedlinburg may be made out. The town of Thale spreads out immediately below the tower.
