= Hexentanzplatz (Harz) =

Plateau above the Bode Gorge in the Harz Mountains in Saxony-Anhalt, Germany

Coordinates: 51°44′03″N 11°01′43″E

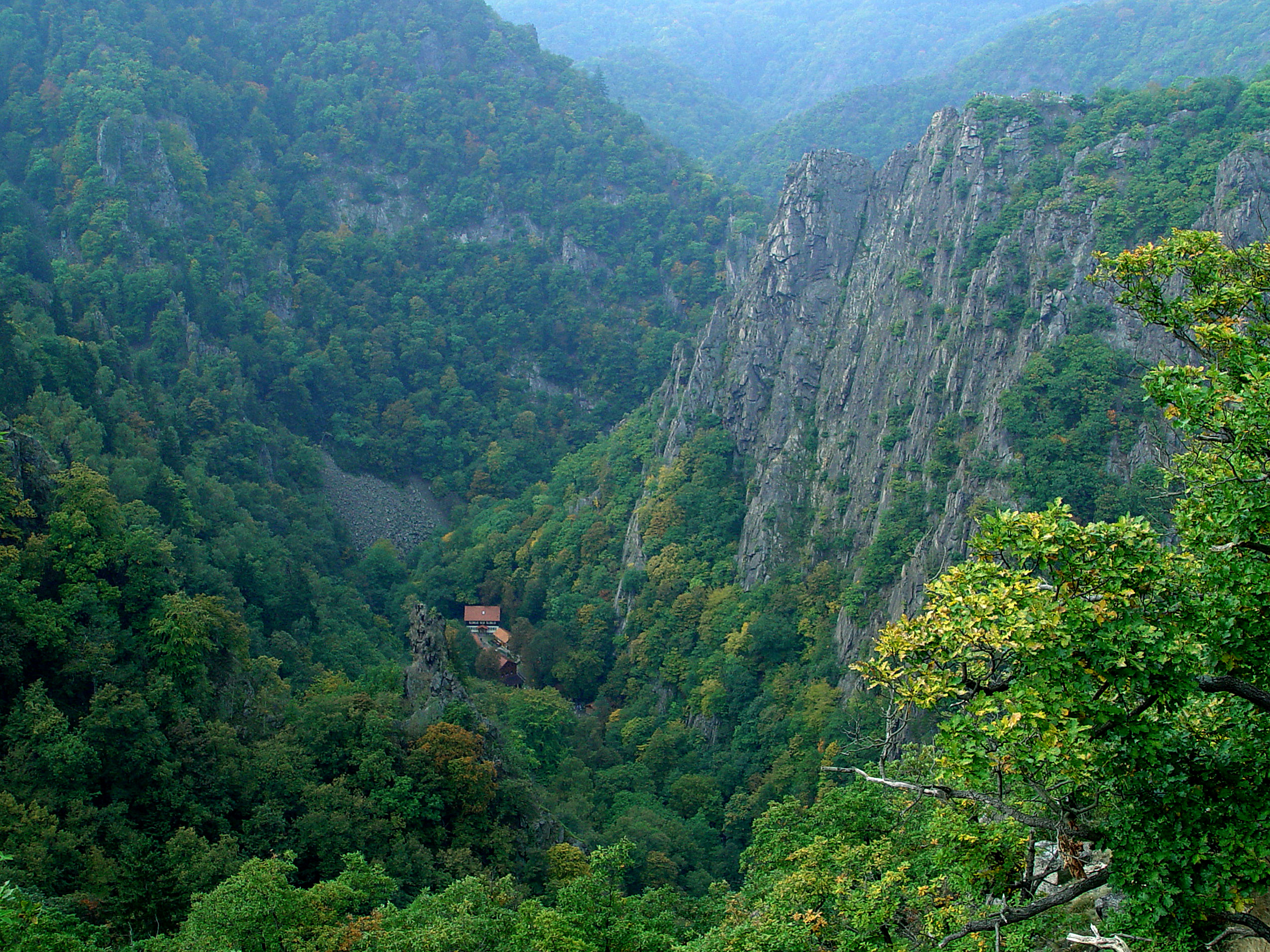
View from the Hexentanzplatz into the Bode Gorge

The Hexentanzplatz (literally “Witches′ Dance Floor”) in the Harz mountains is a plateau (454 m above sea level (NN)) that lies high above the Bode Gorge, opposite the Rosstrappe in Saxony-Anhalt, Germany.

== History ==
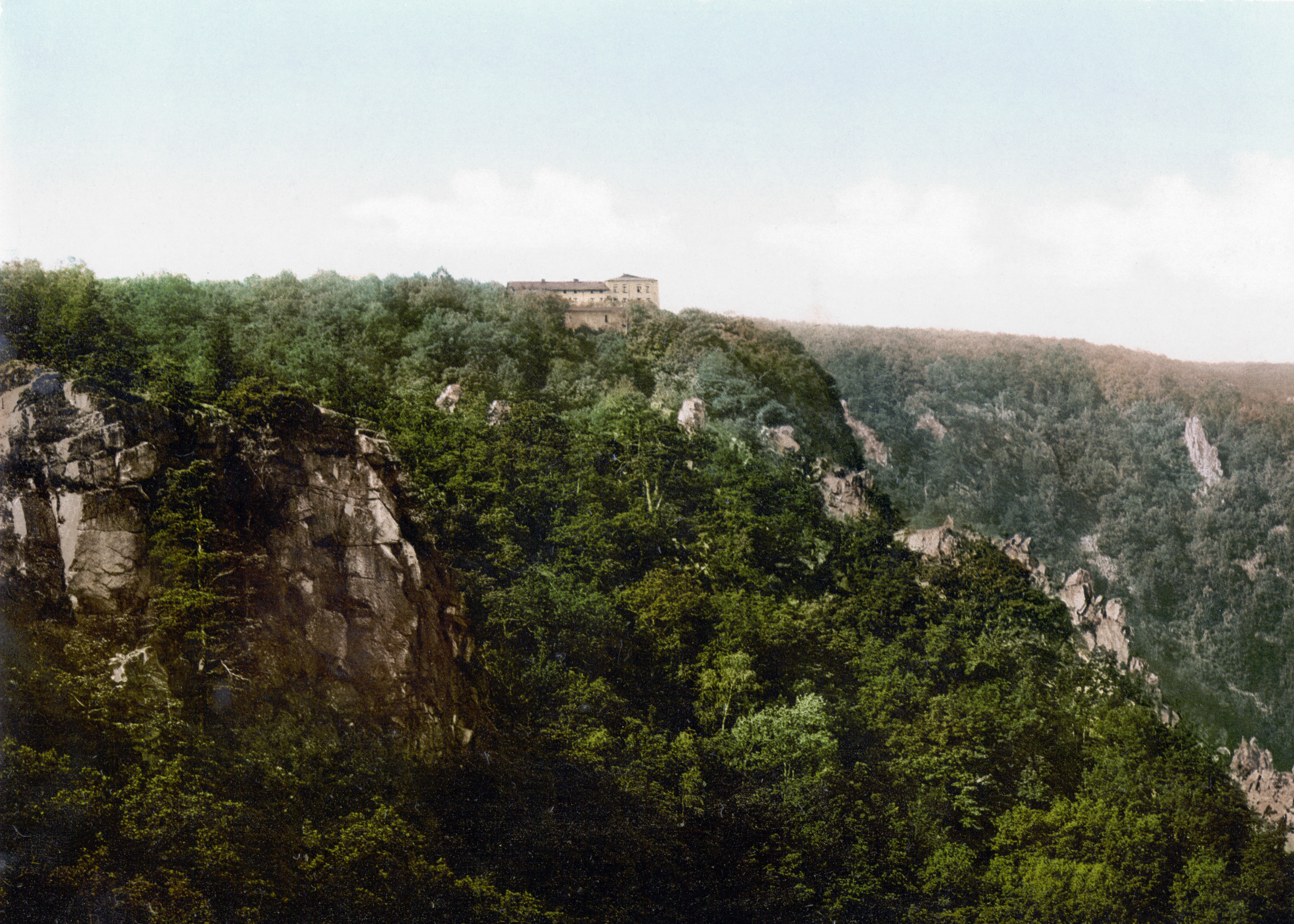
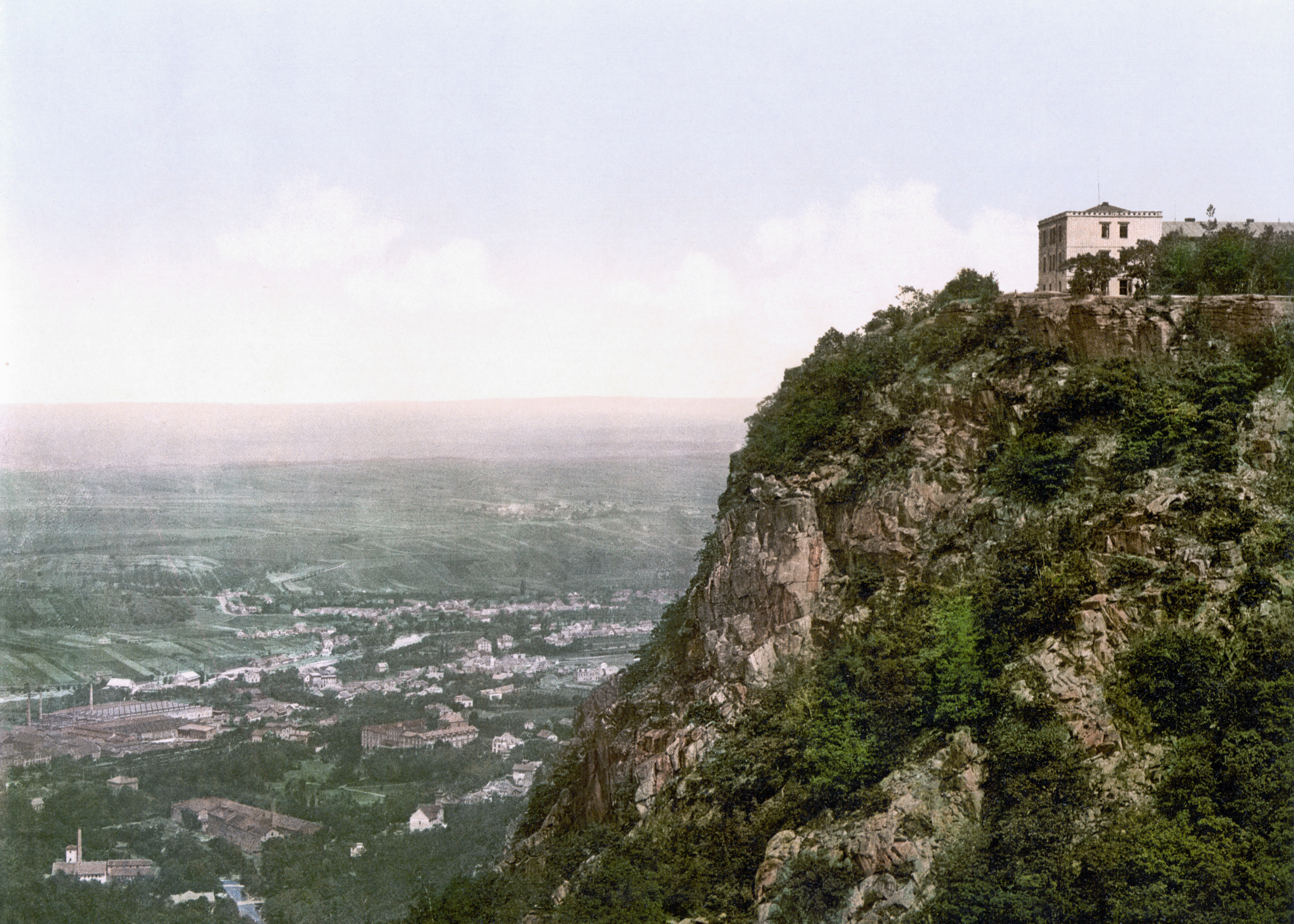
The Hexentanzplatz around 1900

The Hexentanzplatz is reputedly an Old Saxon cult site, at which pagan celebrations were held in honour of the so-called Hagedisen (forest and mountain goddesses), particularly on the night of 1 May. The place did not become known as the Hexentanzplatz until the cult was banned by the invading Christian Franks. According to tradition the site was guarded by Frankish soldiers in order to enforce the ban and they were chased off by Saxons dressed as witches and riding on broomsticks. Another old Saxon cult site is found on the Brocken.

Above the Hexentanzplatz are the remains of the Sachsenwall (“Saxon Dyke”), a wall of granite rocks and possibly part of a larger fortification, more than 1,500 years old.

== Tourism ==
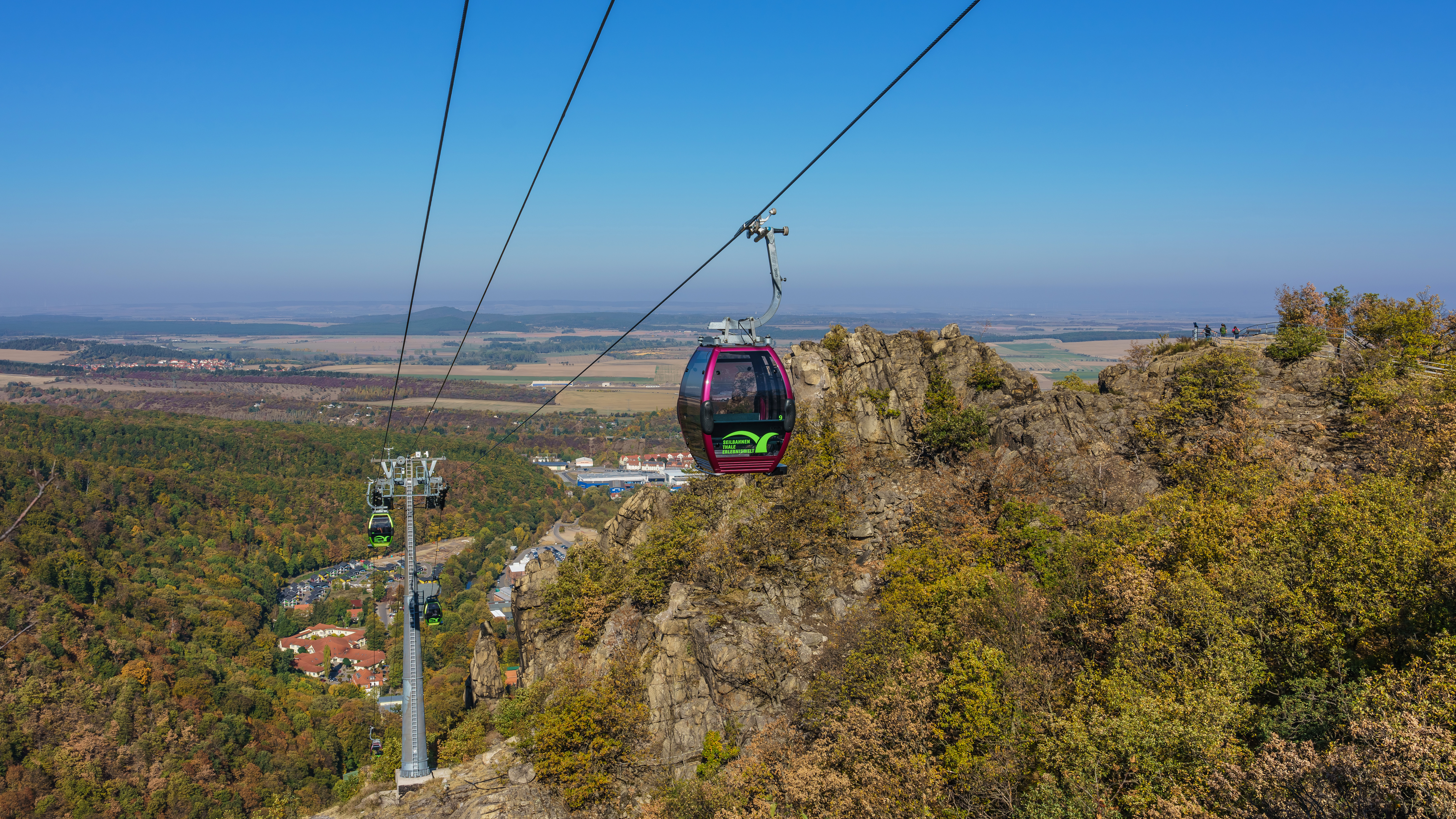
The gondola lift to the Hexentanzplatz

Since the middle of the 19th century there has been a mountain hotel of the same name on the Hexentanzplatz.

On the plateau is the Thale Mountain Theatre (Bergtheater Thale) one of the oldest open-air theatres in Germany with 1,350 seats, which was founded in 1903 by Ernst Wachler.

In the Walpurgishalle Museum, built by painter Hermann Hendrich, the legends of the surrounding Harz mountains and scenes from Goethe's Faust are brought to life. A sacrifice stone (Opferstein) is also exhibited there, which recalls ancient fertility rites.

A gondola lift runs from Thale up to the Hexentanzplatz.

Today, the Hexentanzplatz resembles a small theme park aimed at families, including a car park (charge: 5 euros), gondola lift and mini-coaster rides, small gift and craft shops and a zoo. While there are relatively unspoiled forests nearby with plenty of hiking trails, the immediate area of the Hexentanzplatz has been fairly well commercialized.

The Hexentanzplatz Wildlife Park illustrates the variety of the many different species of animal in the Harz region. There is also a Sommerrodelbahn, the Harzbob; and the Homburg Watchtower lookout tower below the mountain theatre.

There is a checkpoint (no. 167) in the Harzer Wandernadel hiking network at the viewing point of Ellricher Blick.

Sculptures on the Hexentanzplatz

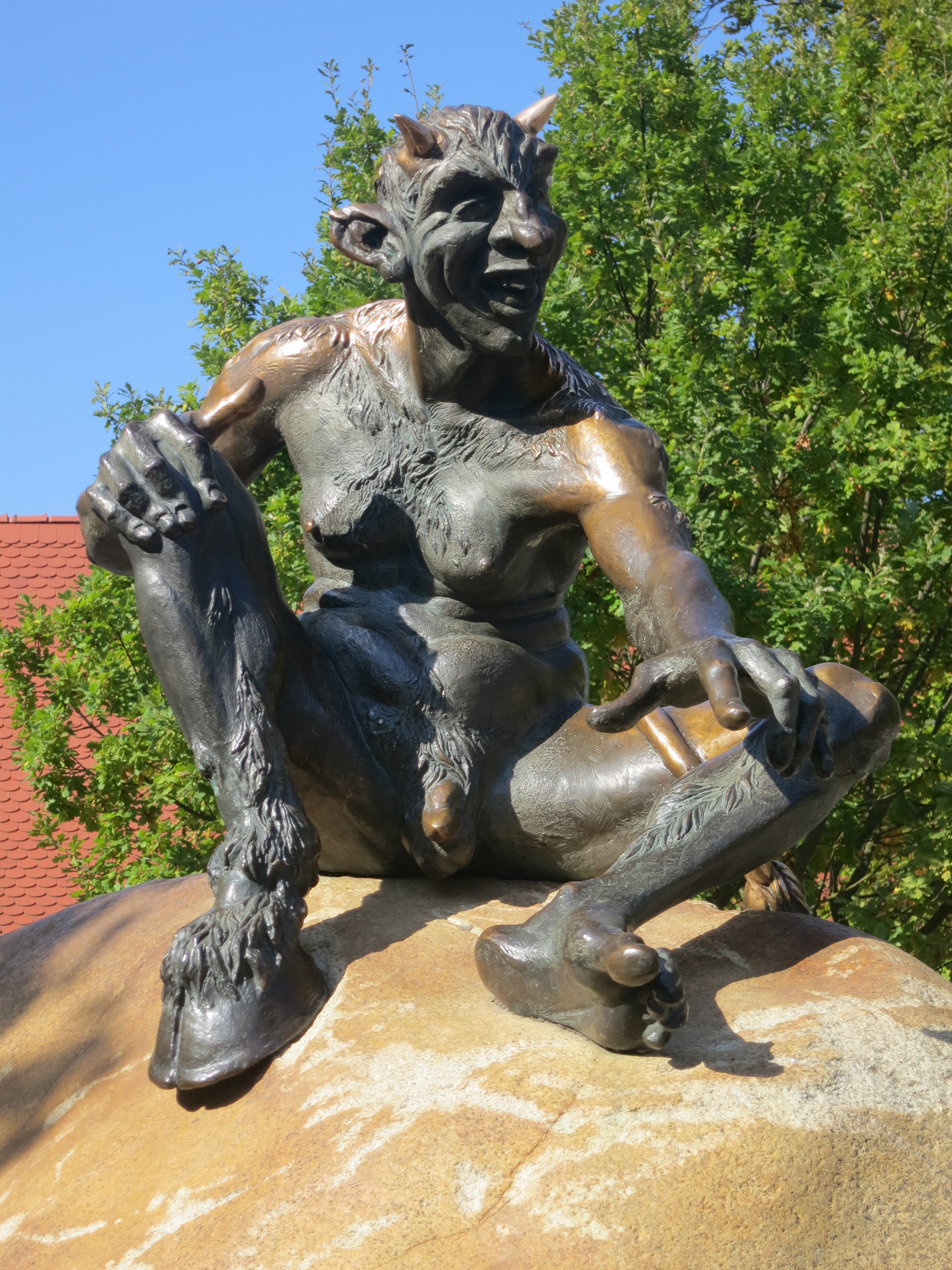
The Devil

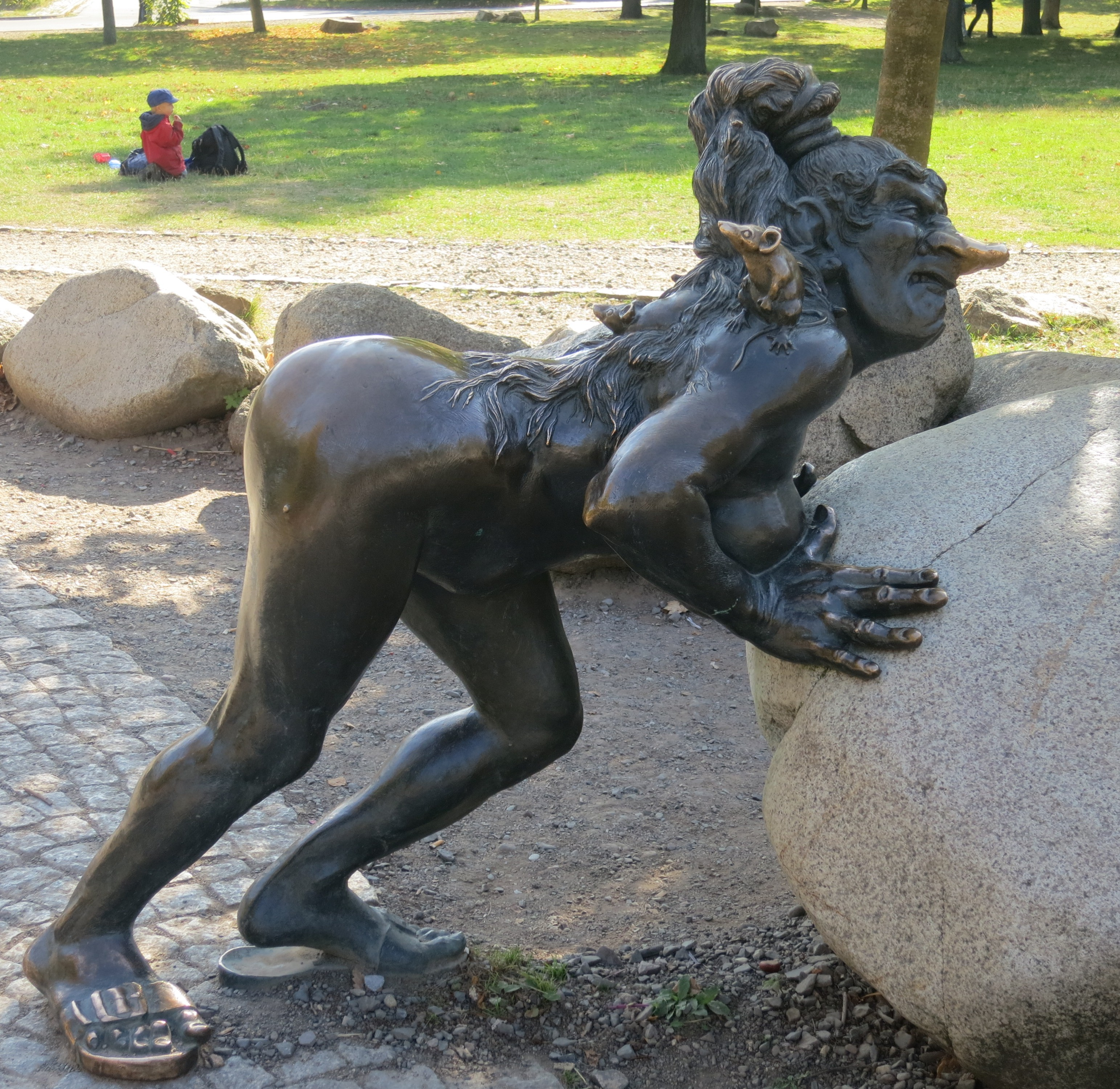
The Witch

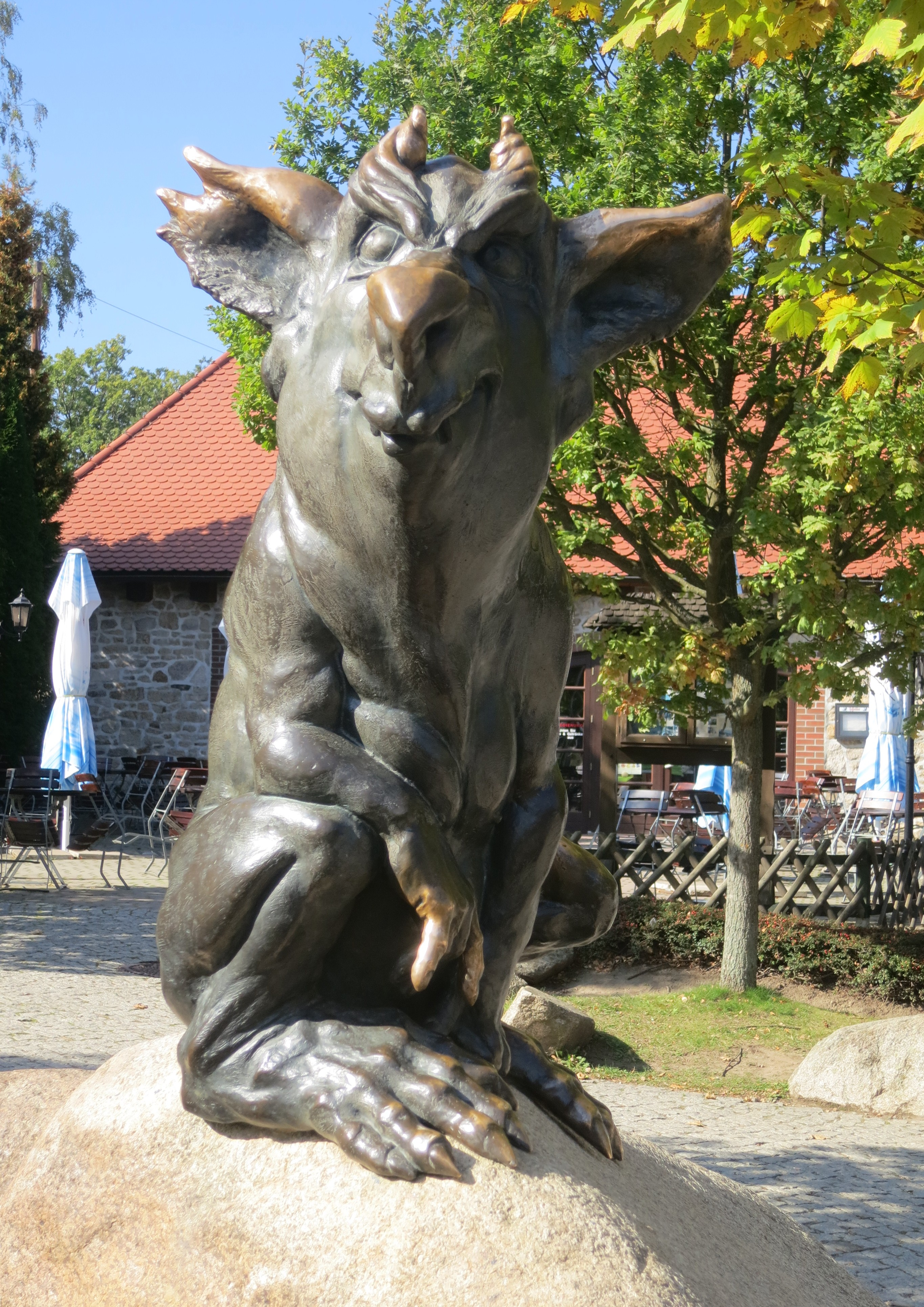
The assistant of the devil

== Sources ==
- Falko Kirsch: Führer durch das Bodetal. Geschichte, Geologie, Sagen, Flora, Fauna. Thale
- Ute Fuhrmann und Rainer Vogt: Die Steine am Hexentanzplatz Stekovics Verlag 2007, ISBN 978-3-89923-116-8
