= Thale =

- Town
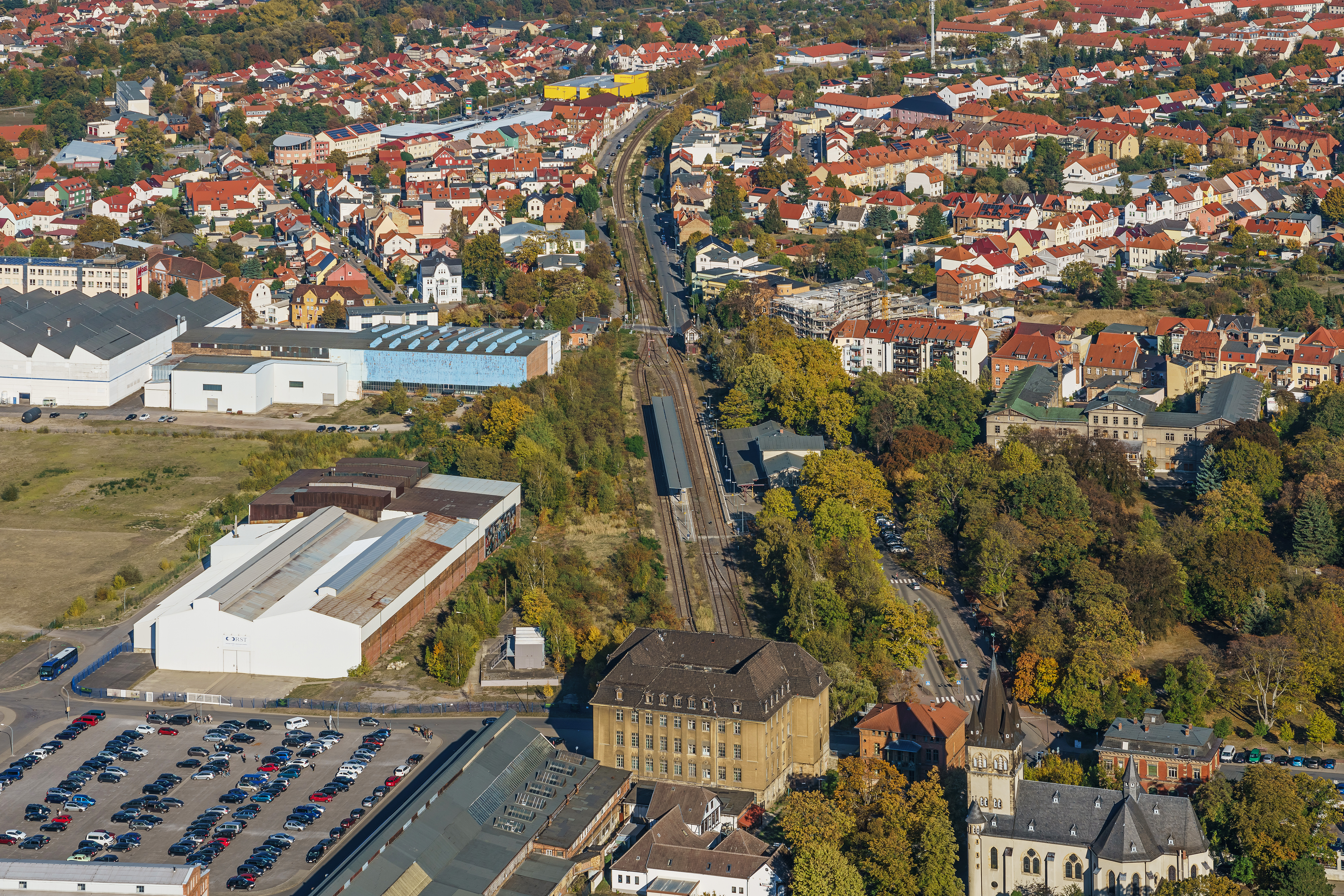
- View from Harz range (Roßtrappe)

- Coat of arms

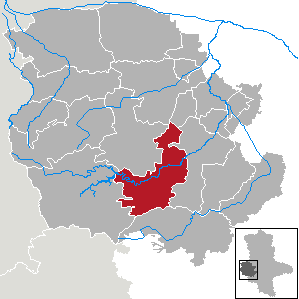
- Location of Thale within Harz district
- Interactive map of Thale
- Location within Germany Location within Saxony-Anhalt
- Coordinates: 51°45′N 11°3′E
- Country: Germany
- State: Saxony-Anhalt
- District: Harz

Government
  - Mayor (2021–28): Maik Zedschack (CDU)

Area
  - Total: 137.6 km^{2} (53.1 sq mi)
- Elevation: 156 m (512 ft)

Population (2025-12-31)
  - Total: 16,591
  - Density: 120.6/km^{2} (312.3/sq mi)
- Time zone: UTC+01:00 (CET)
  - Summer (DST): UTC+02:00 (CEST)
- Postal codes: 06502
- Dialling codes: 03947, 03946, 039456
- Vehicle registration: HZ
- Website: www.thale.de

Thale (pronounced [ˈtaːlə]) is a town in the Harz district in Saxony-Anhalt in central Germany. Located at the steep northeastern rim of the Harz mountain range, it is known for the scenic Bode Gorge stretching above the town centre.

== Geography ==
The town is situated on the river Bode, approximately 8 km (5.0 mi) west of Quedlinburg. Served by Transdev Sachsen-Anhalt trains, Thale Hauptbahnhof is the terminus of the Magdeburg–Thale railway line. The town has access to the Bundesstraße 6n highway.

=== Divisions ===
The town Thale consists of Thale proper and the following Ortschaften or municipal divisions:

- Allrode
- Altenbrak (incl. Alsmfeld and Wendefurth)
- Friedrichsbrunn
- Neinstedt
- Stecklenberg
- Treseburg
- Warnstedt
- Weddersleben
- Westerhausen

== History ==
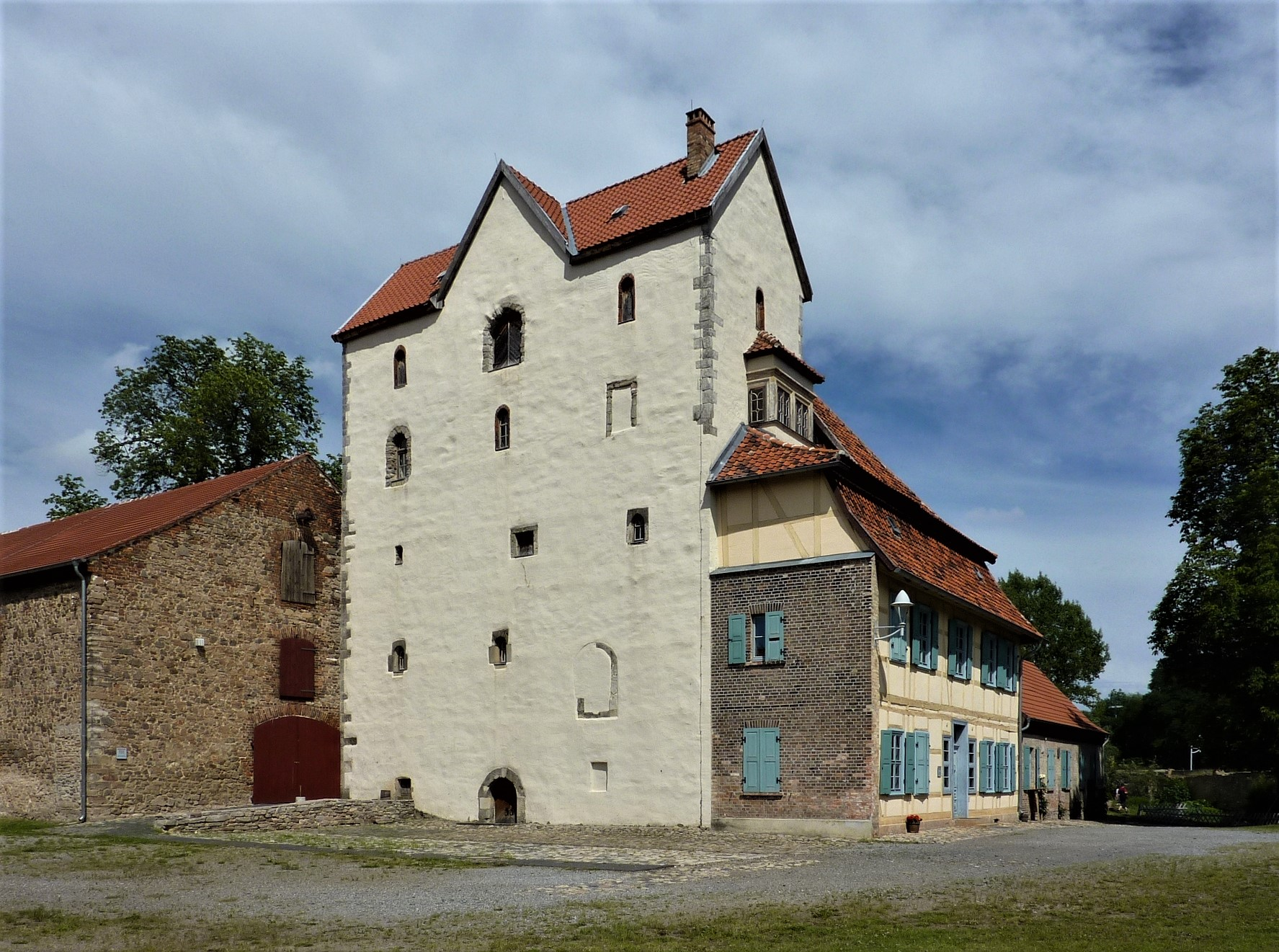
Wendhusen Abbey, westwork

The settlement of Thale probably emerged at the beginning of the 10th century. It was documented in 936 in connexion with the neighbouring Wendhusen Abbey, which had been founded around 825 AD as a chapter of canonesses (Kanonissenstift). Established by an Eastphalian comital family and based on the model of Herford Abbey, it was one of the first monasteries in the medieval Duchy of Saxony. After Queen Dowager Matilda, wife of the late King Henry the Fowler, tried in vain to relocate the convent in 936, it came under the guardianship of the newly established Quedlinburg chapter.

The adjacent village was first mentioned in a 1231 deed as Dat Dorp to dem Dale (from 1288 it was given the Latinised description de valle, and from 1303 as von Thale). In the late Middle Ages, the estates were held by the Saxon Counts of Regenstein, vassals of the Halberstadt prince-bishops. The monastery premises were stormed and devastated in 1525 during the German Peasants' War.

From 1445 the records show that there had been an ironworks in Thale. It was rebuilt from 1648 onwards after the devastations of the Thirty Years' War as the Berghaus zum Wilden Mann, but was fully destroyed in 1670. After the secularised Halberstadt territories were incorporated by Brandenburg-Prussia, a small hammer mill was established in 1686 out of which a new ironworks later developed that benefited especially from its proximity to the ore deposits and the availability of wood. It lasted until 1714. In 1740 a business was opened again. For a short time this ironworks was owned by the Prussian king Frederick the Great.

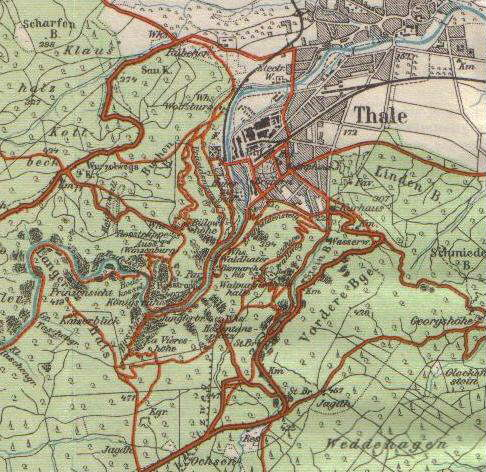
1912 map of Thale

Part of the Prussian Province of Saxony since 1815, the first wrought-iron wagon axle to be made in the German lands was manufactured here in 1831. In 1835 the oldest sheet steel enamel works in Europe was founded in Thale. Following the town's connexion to the railway network in 1862 with a line to Berlin the place flourished as did the number of workers. Whilst the iron industry had only 350 workers in 1872, by 1905 there were as many as 4,400. In particular, the production of enamel contributed to Thale's international renown; in its heyday Thale produced no less than 10% of the world's production. In 1910 Karl Liebknecht, Rosa Luxemburg and Clara Zetkin spoke to Thale's workers. From 1916 steel helmets were produced in Thale. In the World War II Thale had the monopoly on this product (from 1934).

Tourism blossomed from the 19th century onwards in connexion with the radon rich water of the Hubertus Spring, which had been opened up in 1836. As a result, various literary figures visited the place, including Heinrich Heine (Die Harzreise) and Theodor Fontane and especially the Bode Gorge. In addition tourists from Berlin enjoyed the summer resort of Thale. This encouraged the connexion of Thale in 1862 to the railway line from Wegeleben. In 1909 a branch line from Blankenburg (Harz) followed. In 1922 the resort was given town rights. From 12 to 14 June 2009 Thale was the venue for the Saxony-Anhalt Day held under the motto Thale sagenhaft ("Legendary Thale"), and attracted around 200,000 visitors.

=== Incorporation of other municipalities ===
Warnstedt was incorporated in 2003. In 2009 a total of seven municipalities were incorporated on four separate dates. Westerhausen was added in 2010. Allrode became a part of the town of Thale in 2011.

The changes in area are shown in a separate table.

Former municipality	Date
Allrode	1 January 2011
Altenbrak	1 July 2009
Friedrichsbrunn	23 November 2009
Neinstedt	1 January 2009
Stecklenberg	23 November 2009
Treseburg	1 July 2009
Warnstedt	21 December 2003
Weddersleben	1 January 2009
Westerhausen	1 September 2010

Area of the town of Thale

Date	Area
21 December 2003	38.13 km^{2}
1 January 2009	50.13 km^{2}
1 July 2009	78.47 km^{2}
23 November 2009	102.79 km^{2}
1 September 2010	120.21 km^{2}
1 January 2011	137.62 km^{2}

=== Population growth ===
The growth of population (from 1995 censuses were taken every 31 December):

- 1825 – 1,406
- 1875 – 3,311
- 1880 – 3,683
- 1890 – 6,292
- 1925 – 13,545
- 1933 – 13,557
- 1939 – 13,520
- 1946 – 18,082 (29 October)
- 1950 – 17,968 (31 August)
- 1960 – 17,391 (31 December)
- 1971 – 17,620 (1 January)
- 1981 – 16,830 (31 December)
- 1984 – 16,423 (31 December)
- 1990 – 17,560 (3 October)
- 1995 – 16,230
- 2000 – 14,539
- 2001 – 14,167
- 2002 – 13,877
- 2003 – 13,631

== Politics ==
=== Town council ===
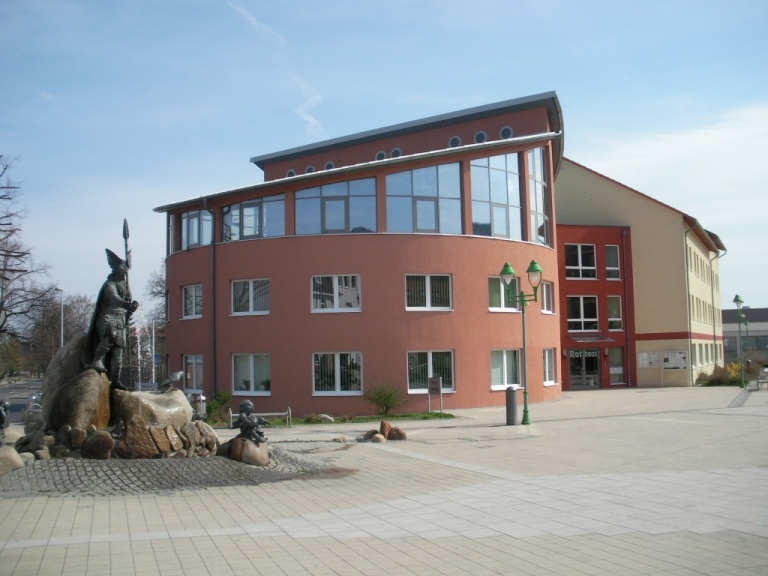
Thale town hall

(according to the official result of the elections for the Thale town council on 7 June 2009; Voter participation: 42.88%, Changes from the previous election in brackets)

- CDU – 59.2%, 17 seats (unchanged)
- Die Linke – 13.3%, 4 seats (unchanged)
- FDP – 8.2%, 2 seats (+1)
- SPD – 7.4%, 2 seats (-1)
- GRÜNE Bürger Fraktion – 4.9%, 3 seats (+3)
- Wählergruppen – 4.1%, 1 seat (-1)
- Einzelbewerber – 2.9%, 0 seats (-1)

=== Coat of arms ===
The coat of arms was approved on 11 July 1996 by the Magdeburg Regional Council (Regierungspräsidium).

=== Partnerships ===
Since 1990 Thale has had a town partnership with Seesen (Lower Saxony) on the northwest edge of the Harz and, since 1998, with the French town of Juvisy-sur-Orge, 18 km from Paris, as well as Tillabéri in Niger, northwest of the River Niger.

== Culture and places of interest ==
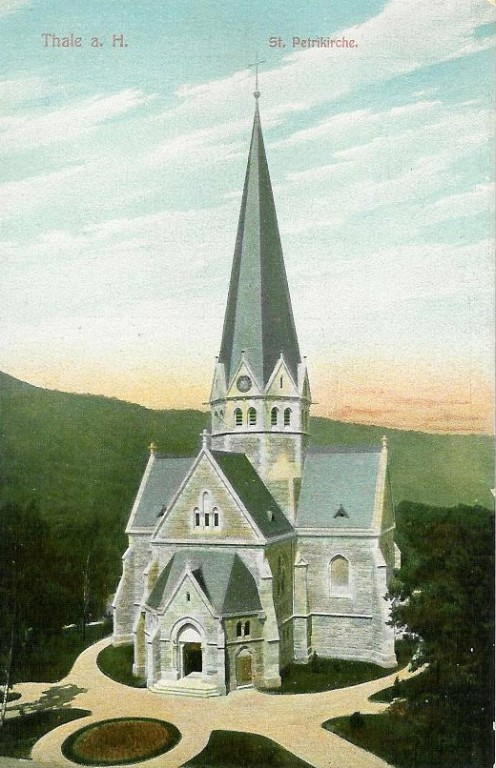
St. Peter's Church (1908)

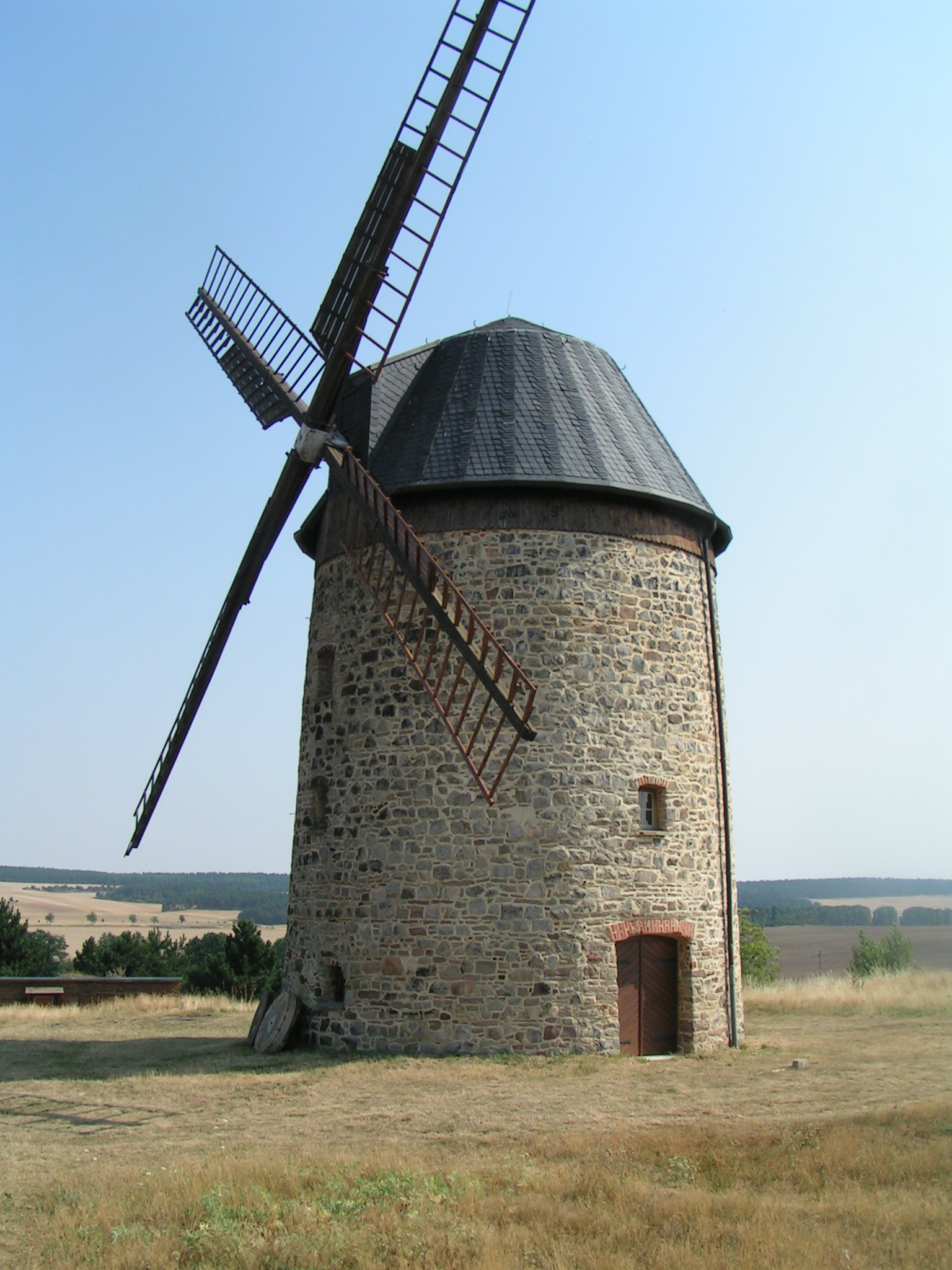
Windmill in Warnstedt

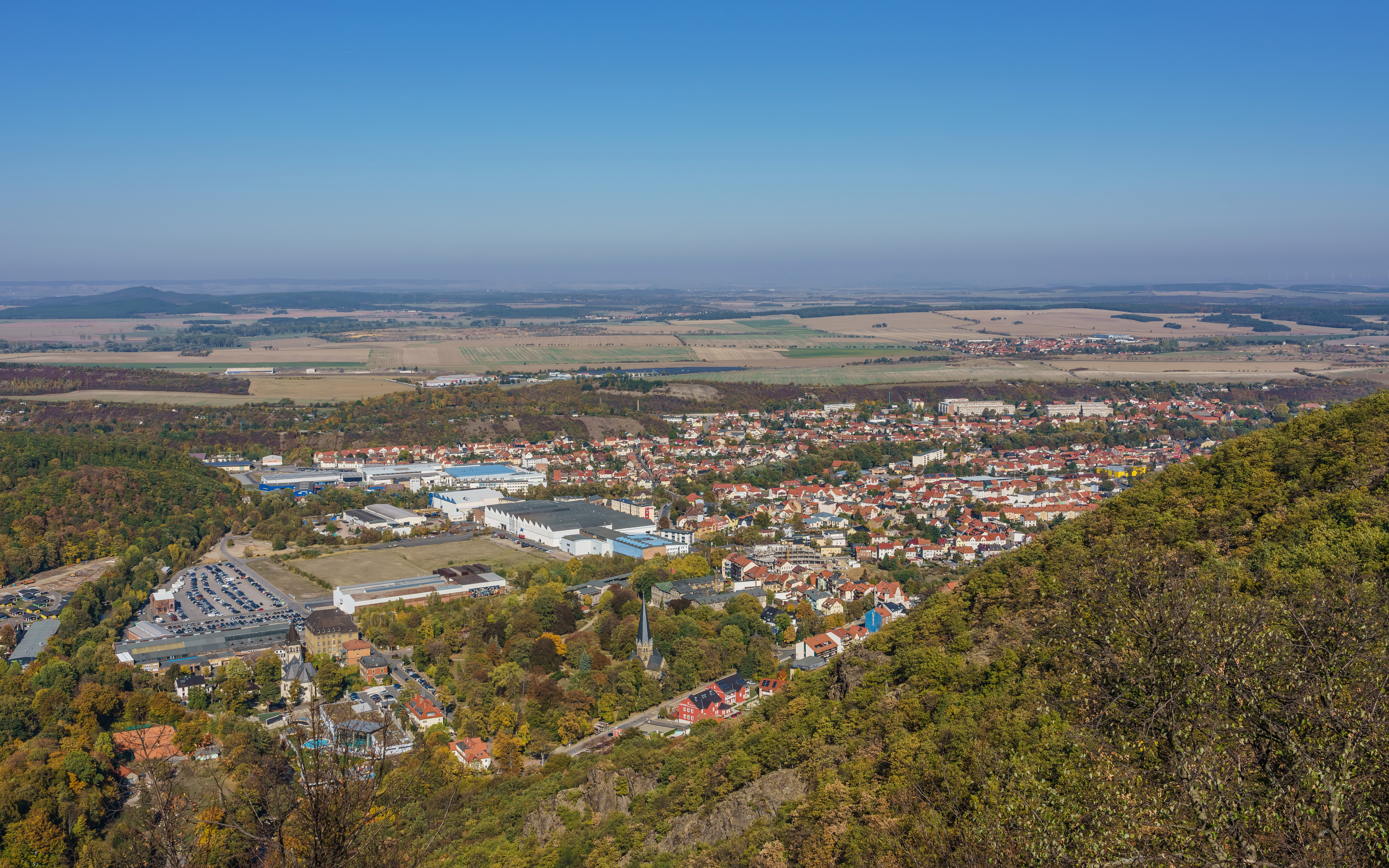
View from Witches' Dancefloor above Thale

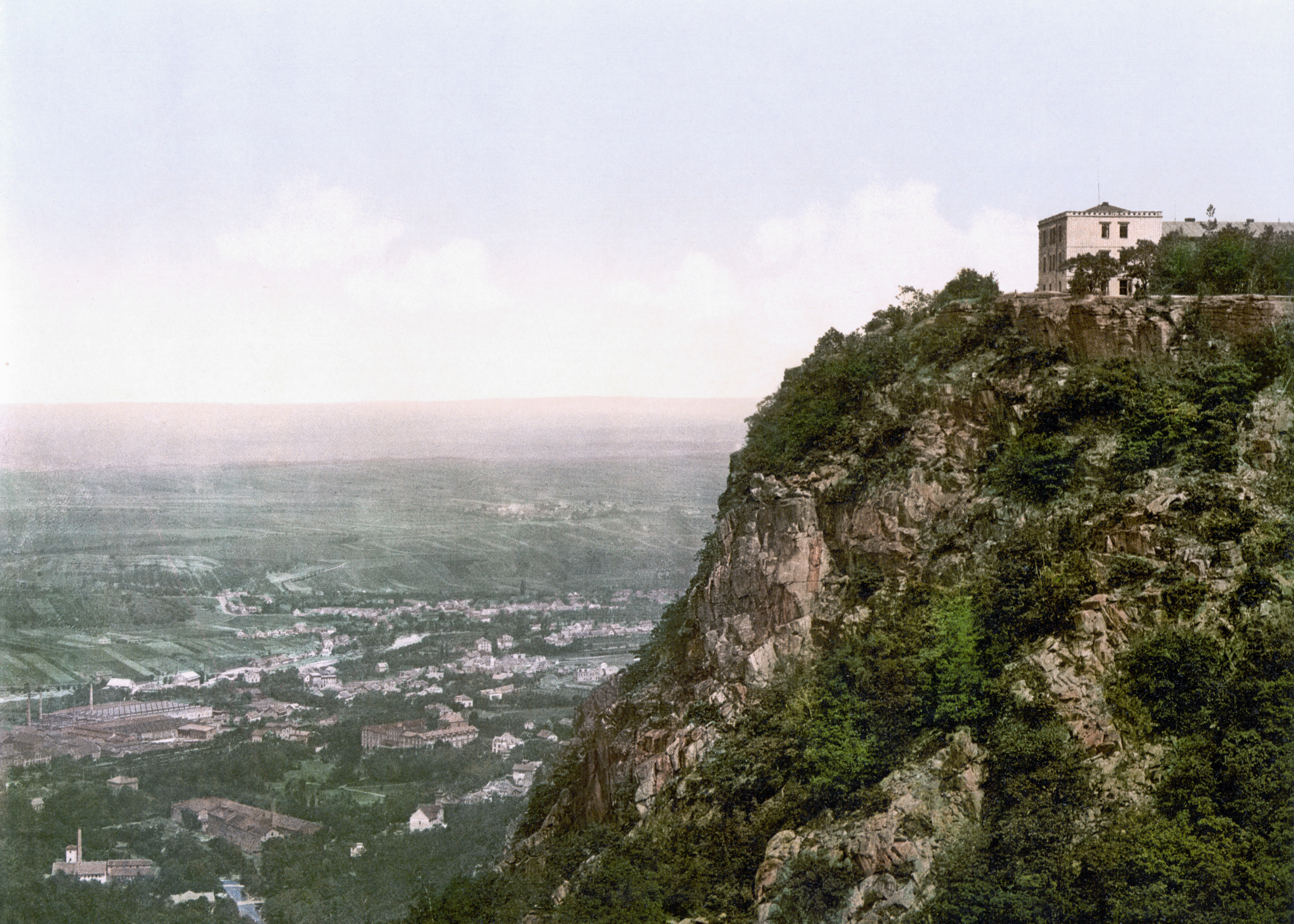
View from the Witches' Dancefloor at Thale around 1900

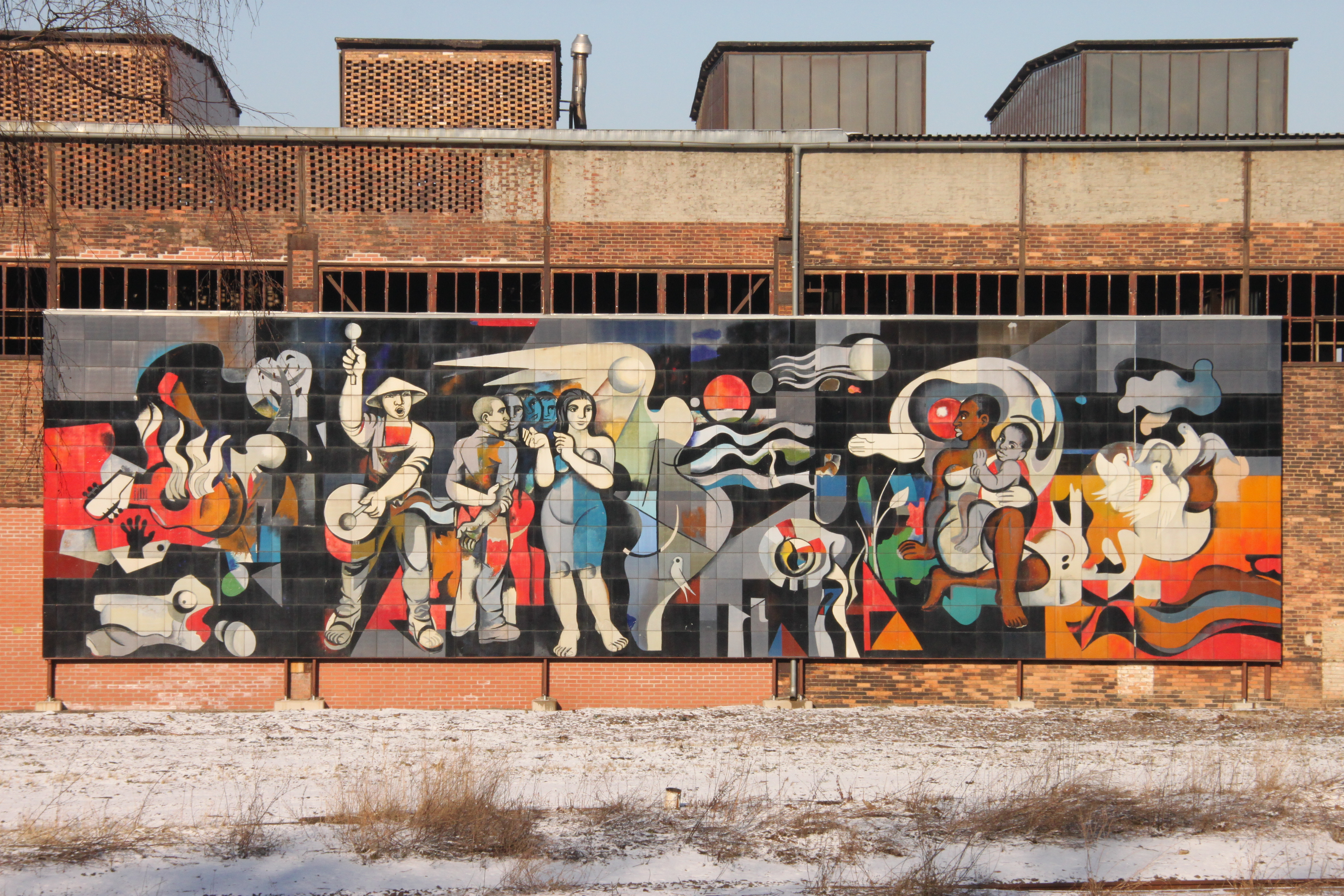
Enamel wall picture near Thale Central Station

=== Museums ===
- Wendhusen Abbey which specialises in the theme of "canoness chapters" (Kanonissenstifte)
- Thale Smelting Museum
- Walpurgis Hall

=== Buildings ===
- The former Wendhusen Abbey, dating to the Carolingian period
- The Hotel Zehnpfund, built in 1863 and once the biggest summer hotel in Germany
- St. Peter's Church, completed in 1906
- The Roman Catholic Church of the Sacred Heart (Herz-Jesu-Kirche), completed in 1910 and 1911
- The prominent windmill in the village of Warnstedt

=== Other cultural sites ===
- Hexentanzplatz ("Witches' Dancefloor")
- Harz Mountain Theatre, Thale
- Wildlife park (Tierpark)
- Sommerrodelbahn
- Bau-Spiel-Haus
- Funpark
- Central Theater (cinema)
- Homburg Watchtower (Homburgswarte)

=== Natural monuments ===
- Bode Gorge - Thale is the gateway to the Bode Gorge which is overlooked by the Hexentanzplatz ("Witches' Dancefloor"), accessible on the Bode Gorge Gondola Lift, and the Roßtrappe, to which a chair lift runs. At the Hexentanzplatz is a large open-air theatre and a zoo.
- Teufelsmauer - near the villages of Weddersleben and Warnstedt lies the Teufelsmauer, one of the oldest nature reserves in Germany.
- Harz Witches' Path - The Harz Witches' Path (Harzer Hexenstieg), a long-distance footpath, runs from Thale for just under 100 km across the Harz to Osterode, passing various sights along the way including the Brocken, Torfhaus, Dammgraben and the Upper Harz Ponds.

== Population history ==
- 1825 - 1,406
- 1910 - 15,000
- 1939 - 13,535
- 1946 - 18,082
- 1950 - 17,968
- 1960 - 17,391
- 1971 - 17,620
- 1981 - 16,830
- 1984 - 16,423
- 1999 - 15,153

== Media ==
Thale is the setting of Theodor Fontane's novel Cécile. Fontane stayed in Thale a number of times between 1868 and 1884.

=== Sons and daughters of the city ===
- Bernhard Rensch (1900–1990), evolutionary biologist, zoologist, behavioral researcher, neurophysiologist and philosopher
- Albrecht Becker (1906–2002), production designer, photographer and actor
- Harald Duschek (born 1956), ski jumper
- Volker Herold (born 1959), actor

=== Personalities associated with Thale ===
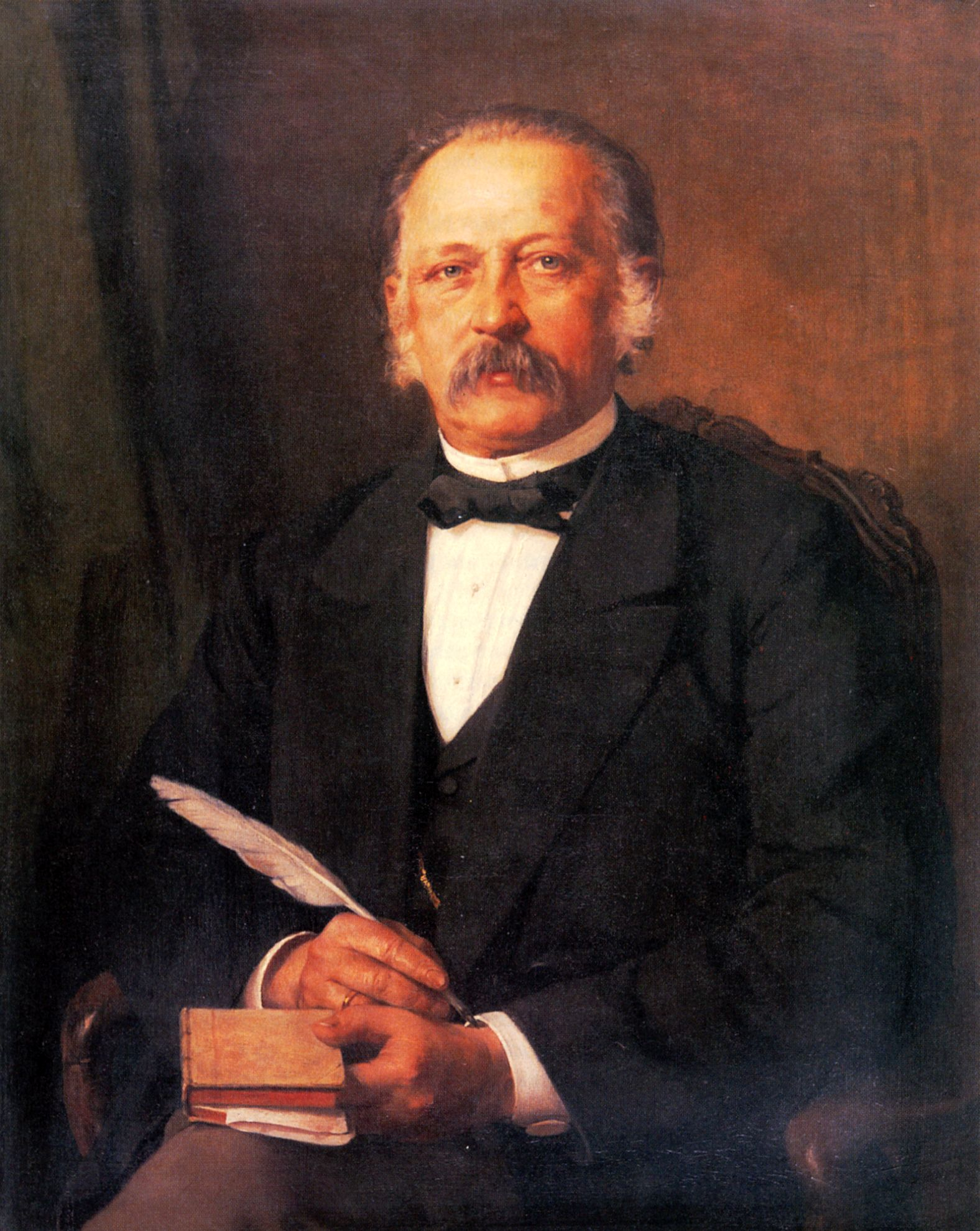
Theodor Fontane in 1883

- Friedrich Wilhelm Leopold Pfeil (1783–1859), forestry scholar, spent time relaxing and hunting in the forest near Thale
- Theodor Fontane (1819–1898) stayed in Thale 1868, 1877, 1881, 1882, 1883 and 1884, wrote the novel playing in Thale Cécile
- Karl Bonhoeffer (1868–1948), psychiatrist, neurologist, medical expert, married to Paula von Hase, had a summer house in Friedrichsbrunn since 1913
- Hans Schemm (1891–1935), NSDAP-Gauleiter, directed the bacteriological-chemical laboratory Hubertusbad until 1921
- Bernhard Rensch (1900–1990), evolutionary biologist and ornithologist
- Axel von dem Bussche (1919–1993), officer and resistance fighter, knight-owner in Thale
- Werner Oberländer (1921–2002), footballer at Stahl Thale and Eintracht Braunschweig, with both clubs he played at the highest level of football
- Gojko Mitić (born 1940), actor, played various roles in the Harz mountain theater
- Leni Riefenstahl (1902–2003), Nazi film director and actress, attended girls' boarding school in the village
