= Bode Gorge =

Ravine that forms part of the Bode valley in central Germany

Coordinates: 51°44′08″N 11°00′35″E

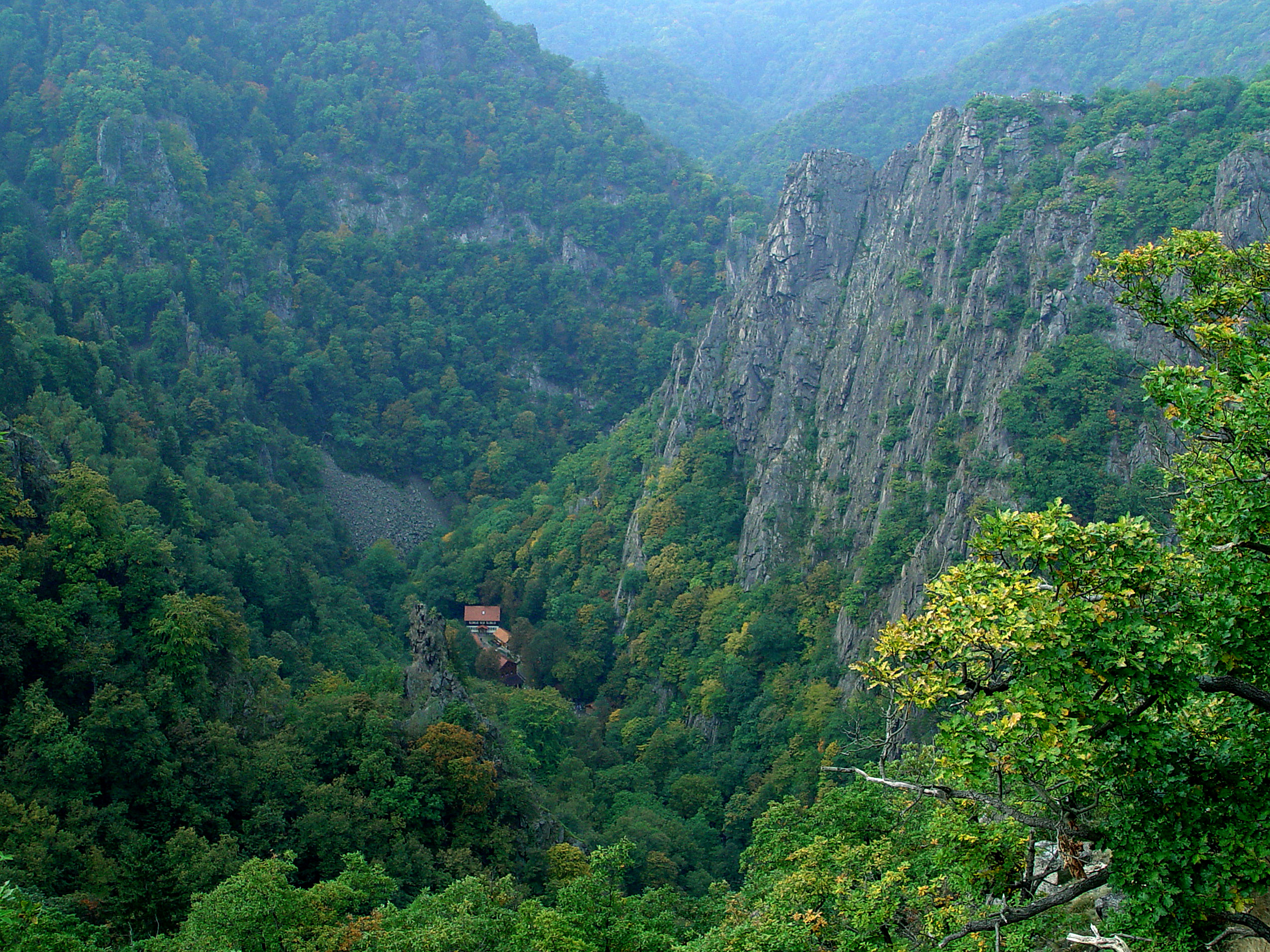
View from the Hexentanzplatz into the Bode Gorge

The Bode Gorge (German: Bodetal) is a 10 km (6.2 mi) long ravine that forms part of the Bode valley between Treseburg and Thale in the Harz Mountains of central Germany. The German term, Bodetal (literally "Bode Valley"), is also used in a wider sense to refer to the valleys of the Warme and Kalte Bode rivers that feed the River Bode.

At the Bode Gorge, the River Bode, which rises on the highest mountain in the Harz, the Brocken, has cut deeply into the hard Ramberg granite rock. The ravine is about 140 m deep at Treseburg and some 280 m deep at Thale where it breaks out into the Harz Foreland. The Bode Gorge was designated a nature reserve as early as 5 March 1937; its boundaries being subsequently expanded. Its current area – 473.78 hectares (1,170.7 acres) – makes it one of the largest nature reserves in Saxony-Anhalt.

== Geology ==
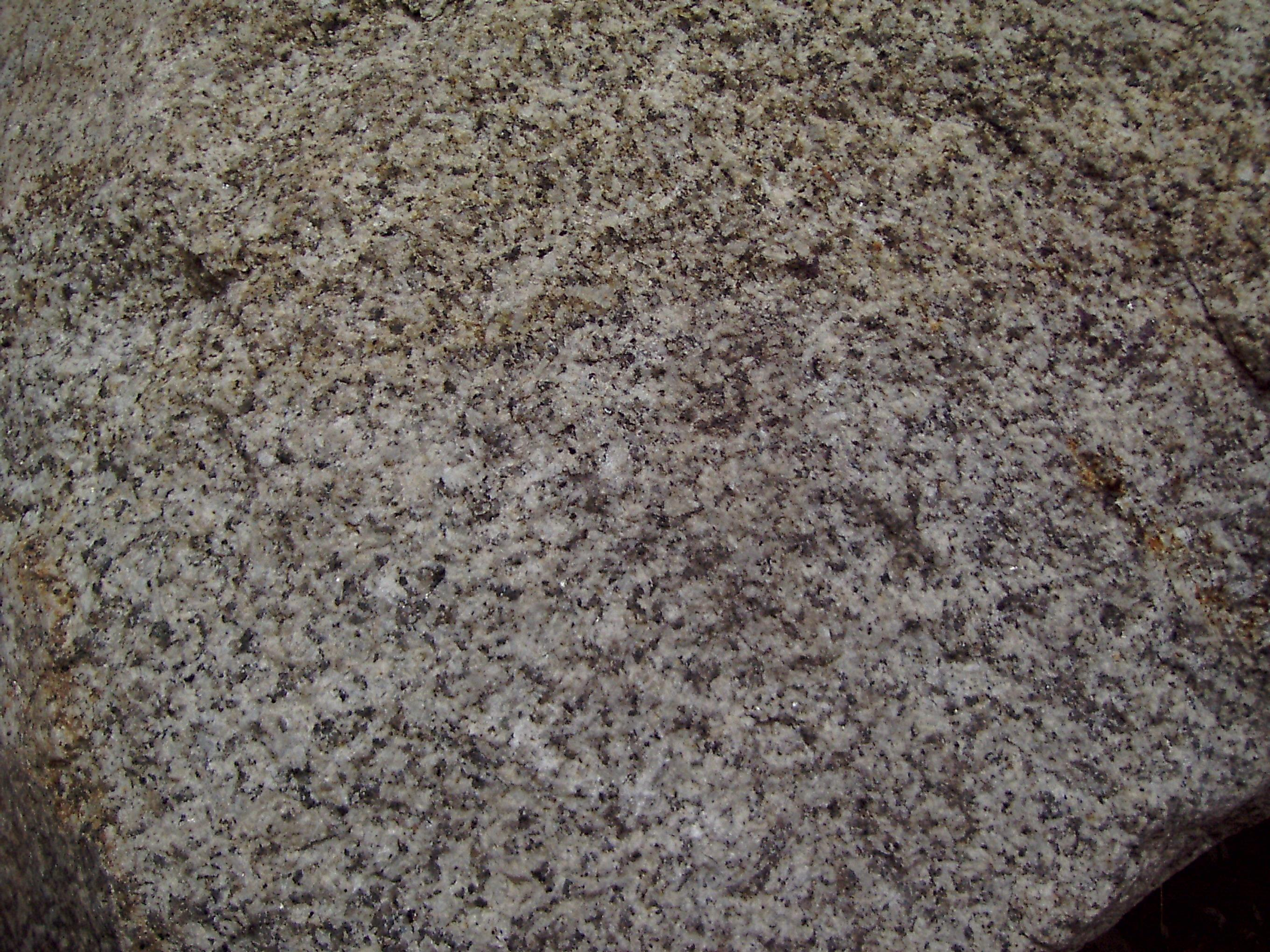
Fresh piece of Ramberg granite from the Bode Gorge

Apart from intrusions of Ramberg granite, which rose to the surface and solidified 300 million years ago in the Upper Carboniferous Period, and their associated veins of quartz, the ravine of the Bode also cuts through hornfels and knotenschiefer (a type of slate), as well as argillite and graywacke with quartz elements and diabase dikes from the Devonian Period, 400 to 370 million years ago. Ramberg granite predominantly forms the front section of the ravine and characterises its highest rocks. It appears light-coloured due to the high proportion of white feldspar. The quartz lends it a grey shade. The proportion of black mica (biotite) is low and carries no weight in terms of colouring. The light-coloured granite stands out from the dark to black coloured rocks of hornfels and argillite. As a result, the front section of the ravine and the riverbed of the Bode in this area appear clearly lighter than the rear section. The argillite at the rear of the gorge shows bands of colour in places that evinces the former strata of the marine sediments. The stratified slate was only slightly metamorphosed.

== Climate ==
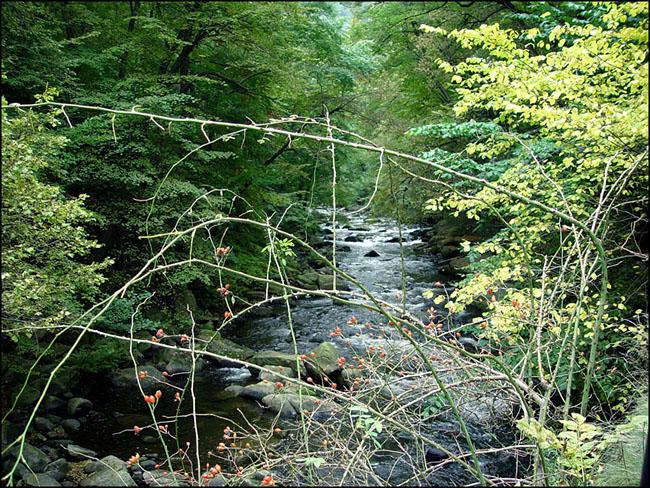
The Bode Gorge entering the Bode Gorge Nature Reserve at Treseburg

In the area of the Bode Gorge average annual temperatures range from 8 °C down to 6.5 °C and annual precipitation between 600 and 720 mm. But sharp, local differences in the ravine between, for example, the sunny, warm and dry southern slopes and the more shaded, cooler and damper northern slopes and valley floor, modify the local climate considerably.

== Soils ==
The most common soil types are silicate leptosols, that belong to the thin stony soils around areas of rock and scree. In flatter areas with less rearrangement of the soil particles are stony Ranker leptosols of various thickness. One particular soil type, brown Ranker occurs above argillite rock. Podsolised brown earth soils are found around the edges of the gorge.

== Rivers and streams ==
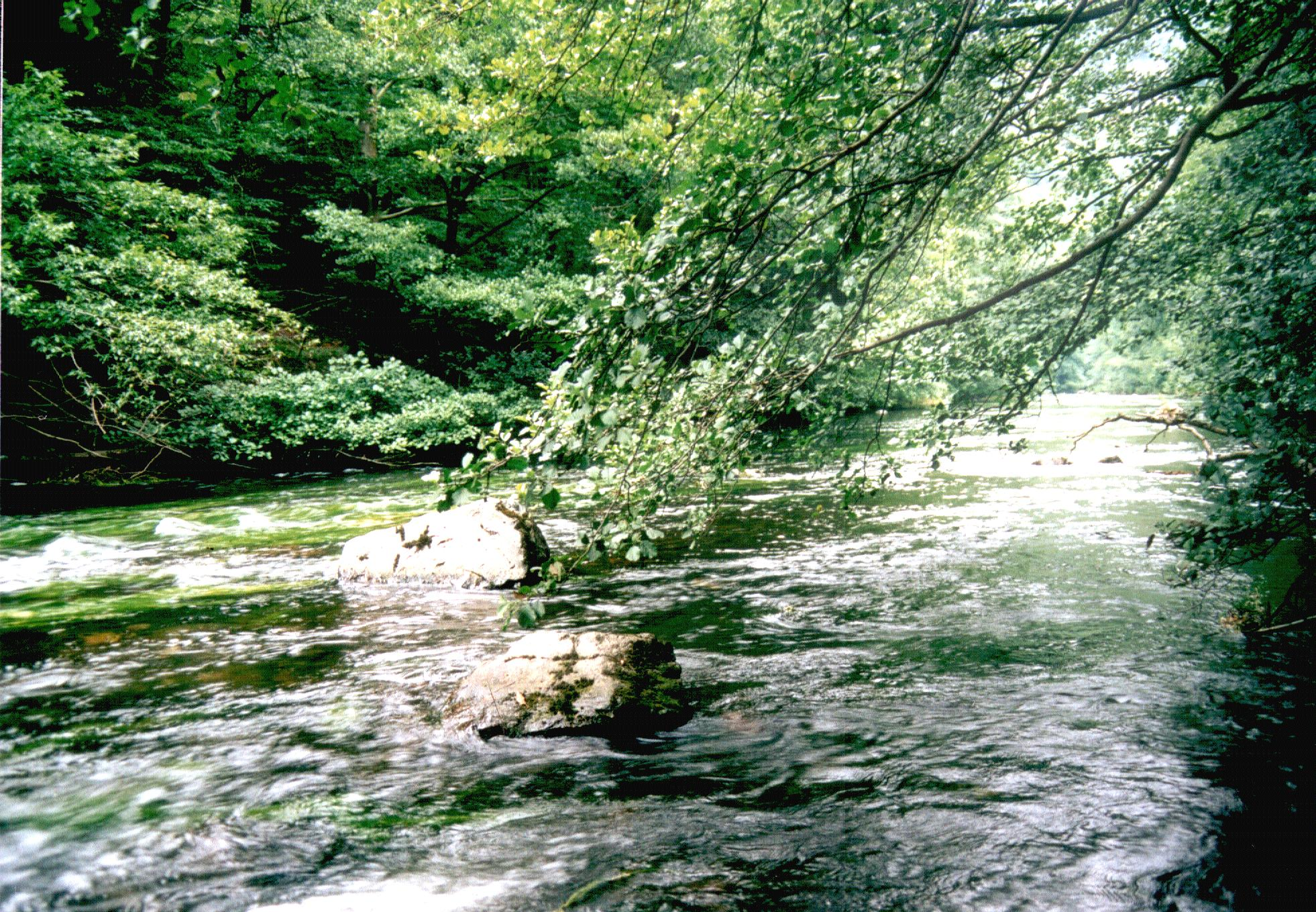
The Wilde Bode and granite blocks

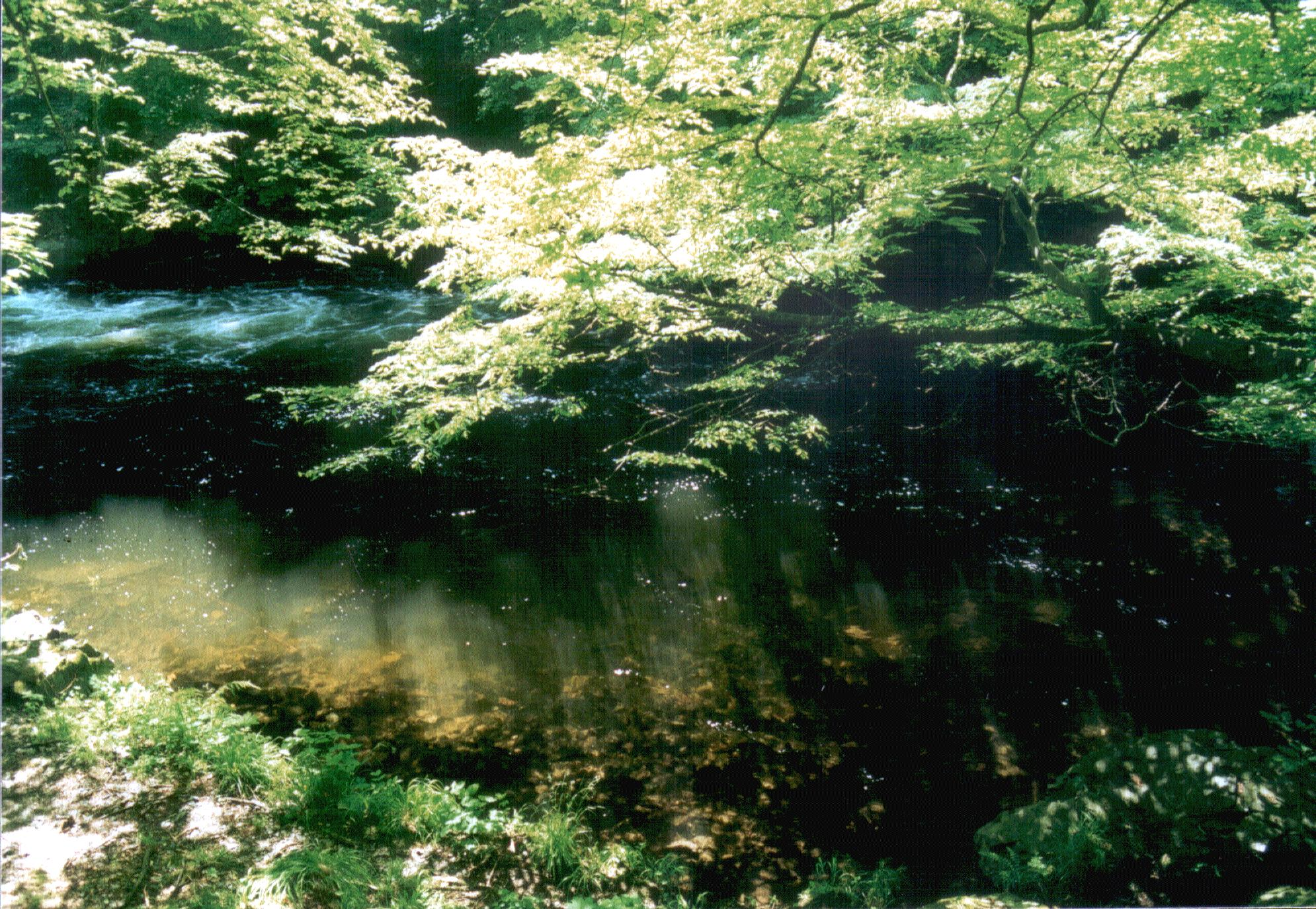
The Zahme Bode north of Treseburg

In the area of the ravine the Bode has a width of 7 to 25 metres and descends 100 metres in 17 kilometres. Its river course and bed are very much in their natural state inside the ravine. Kettle-holes, rapids and scouring in the rock alternate with islands of gravel and flat river banks. The most notable rapids on the Bode, the Bodekessel, not far southwest of the Königsruhe tavern, is shrouded in legend. It was a low waterfall before its explosive demolition in 1798. Stones and boulders occupy the riverbed. Slow-moving stretches of water occur, especially in the area of the Hornfels (Zahme Bode); rapids (Wilde Bode) are found particularly in the lower part of the ravine and formed by the incision of the river into the blocks of Ramberg granite. The water regime inside the ravine is affected, however, by the dams owned by the Bodewerk in the upper reaches of the river. The discharge can vary sharply: during the devastating New Year floods of 1925 a discharge of 350 m^{3}/s was recorded; in the summer of 1926 the Bode almost ran dry (0.,35 m^{3}/s). Other major floods occurred in 1667, 1730 and in April 1984. There was a plan to impound the Bode in the ravine as well in 1891 with a 150 m high dam proposed at the Bodekessel. The plan was scrapped.

Only a few streams enter the Bode, on the right-hand side of the ravine. The Luppbode is a lively, bubbling brook coming from the direction of Allrode which joins the Bode near Treseburg. Another tributary stream is the Dambach, which empties into the Bode from a side ravine below the Rabenstein.

== Flora and fauna ==
=== Vegetation ===
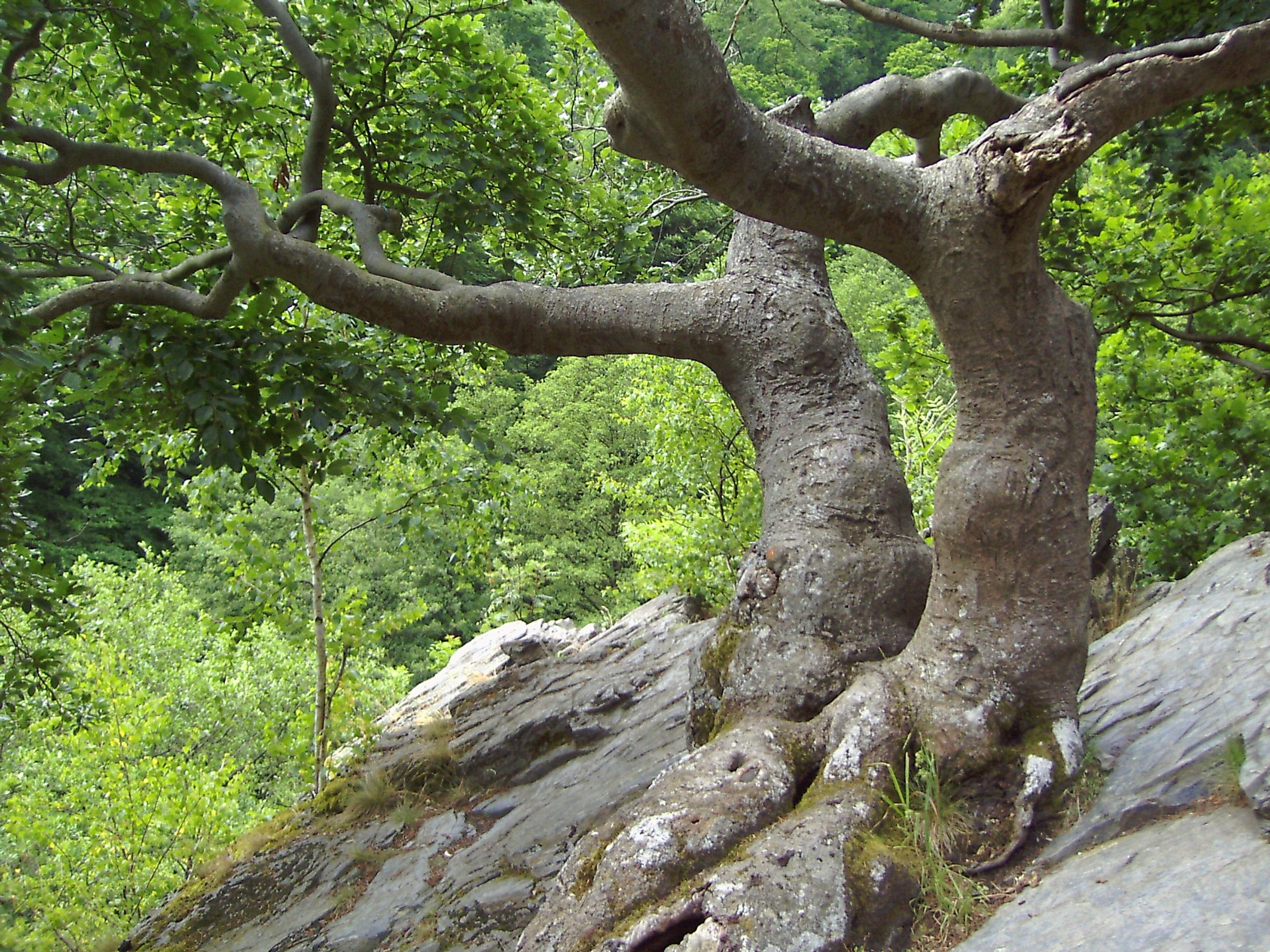
Old beeches on a cliff above the Bode

There is a rapid succession of habitats in the Bode Gorge that produces a tightly woven mosaic of vegetation, characterised by an especially rich variety of plant species.

- On the steeper slopes, small clumps of ravine and scree forest (Blockschutt) alternate with dry broad-leaved woods, scree slopes, silicate rock outcrops with rock vegetation, crags and xerothermous grass.
- Meadows of cheddar pink and Alpine aster and Anthericum heath in the Bode Gorge have been classified as rock meadows.
- The most widespread dry forests are the birch-oak woods and the catchfly-sessile oak woods.
- In places, extensive and very near-natural lime-sycamore ravine woods and scree woods have developed on the lower mountainsides (Tilio-Acerion) on shaded slopes.
- On small areas of the lower slopes on acidophilous soil, copper beech woods occur (Luzulo-Fageten).
- The banks of the Bode, in places where the water velocity is slow, have favoured the formation of reed beds of reed canary grass (Phalaridetum arundinaceae) and ground elder-butterbur meadows (Aegopodio podagrariae-Petisetum albae).

The most common trees in the woods are sessile oak (Quercus petraea), large-leaved lime (Tilia platyphyllos), sycamore (Acer pseudoplatanus), silver birch (Betula pendula) and rowan (Sorbus aucuparia). Also worth mentioning is the common yew (Taxus baccata).

Dominating the ground cover are plants like the wood bluegrass (Poa nemoralis), wavy hair-grass (Avenella flexuosa; especially in dry oak woods), white wood-rush (Luzula luzuloides), male fern (Dryopteris filix-mas), limestone oak fern (Gymnocarpium robertianum), wall hawkweed (Hieracium murorum), baneberry (Actaea spicata), small balsam (Impatiens parviflora), Herb Robert (Geranium robertianum), dog's mercury (Mercurialis perennis).

A special plant community has grown on the granite rocks. Plants such as the snowy mespilus (Amelanchier ovalis), dyer’s greenweed (Genista tinctoria), browntop bent (Agrostis capillaris), sticky catchfly (Lychnis viscaria), blue stonecrop (Sedum reflexum) are particularly common.

The scenery in spring is graced by wood anemones (Anemone nemorosa) and yellow anemones (Anemone ranunculoides), hollowroot (Corydalis cava), spring vetchling (Lathyrus vernus), kidneywort (Hepatica nobilis) and alternate-leaved golden saxifrage (Chrysosplenium alternifolium), which grows on stream banks, but also covers scree slopes like a carpet. Common toothwort (Lathraea squamaria) and spring snowflake (Leucojum vernum) also occur here and there.

Perennial honesty (Lunaria rediviva) and large white buttercup (Ranunculus platanifolius) may be found in places in the woods.

=== Species ===
The Bode Gorge ist also a habitat and refuge for many types of rare animal. Such rarities include the wildcat, Bechstein's bat, peregrine falcon, black stork, middle spotted woodpecker. The insect fauna is particularly varied. The white-throated dipper and grey wagtail can be observed hunting for insects on the stream beds. Mallard breed here and there in the reed beds or on remote gravel beds. In spring fire salamanders can be seen splashing about in the Bode Gorge during the spawning season. Care must be taken when walking not to disturb them.

Where it flows through the gorge, the Bode, is characterised by fast-flowing, clean, shady stretches of river. In addition to brown trout it ish also home to loach, bullhead, three-spined stickleback and minnow. Rare visitors include pike, dace and perch. Rainbow trout have been introduced by anglers.

== Tourism ==
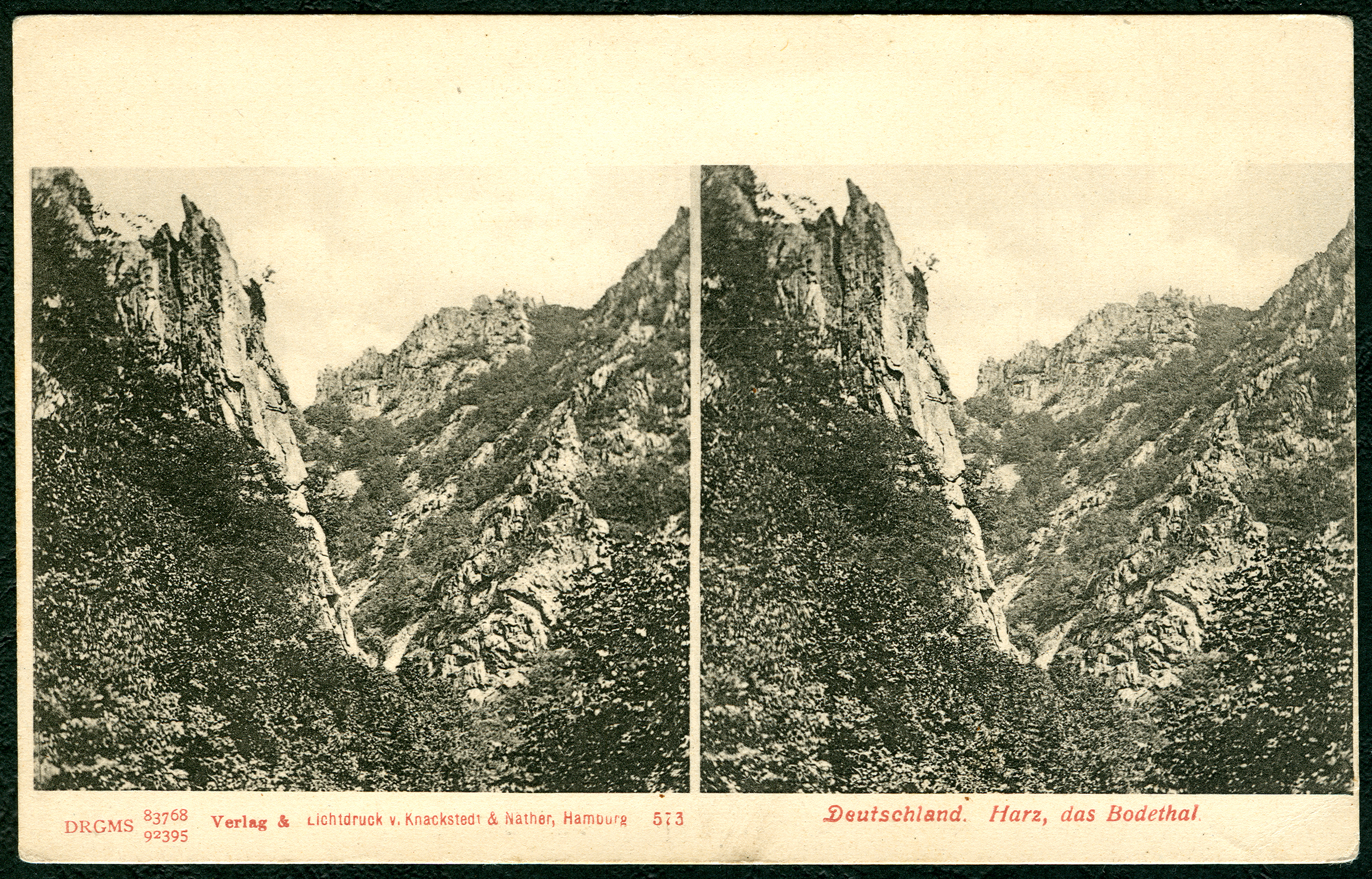
3-D-documentation about 1900: stereoscopy No. 573 by Knackstedt & Näther

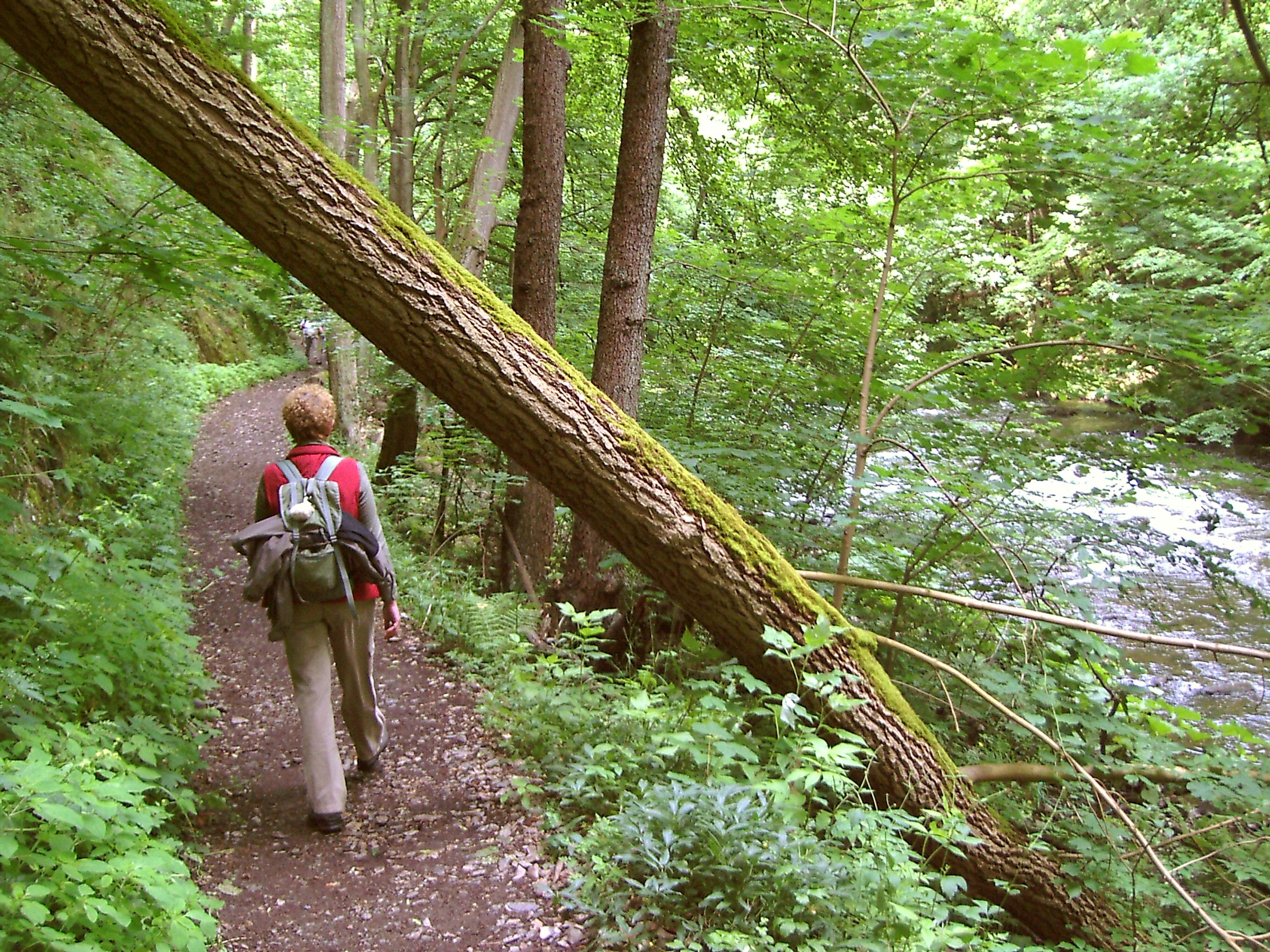
Main footpath in the Bode Gorge

The Bode Gorge may only be passed through on foot. A cycle path or bridleway is not feasible due to the narrowness of the ravine. Climbing and walking off the path, mountain biking, canyoning, water walking and whitewater canoeing or rafting are banned in order to protect the wildlife and biotope. Tourist facilities, restaurants and overnight accommodation are located at Thale by the entrance to the Bode Gorge.

A ten kilometre long footpath runs through the Bode Gorge between Thale and Treseburg. At pinch points the path is routed in steep zigzags and walkways over the rocks. From them there are superb views into the ravine. Paths lead down into the gorge from the observation rocks at Rosstrappe and the Hexentanzplatz ("Witches' Dance Floor"). From the latter there is also a ridgeway to Treseburg. The Bode Gorge receives hundreds of thousands of visitors per year and is one of the leading tourist destinations in Saxony-Anhalt.

== Places of interest ==
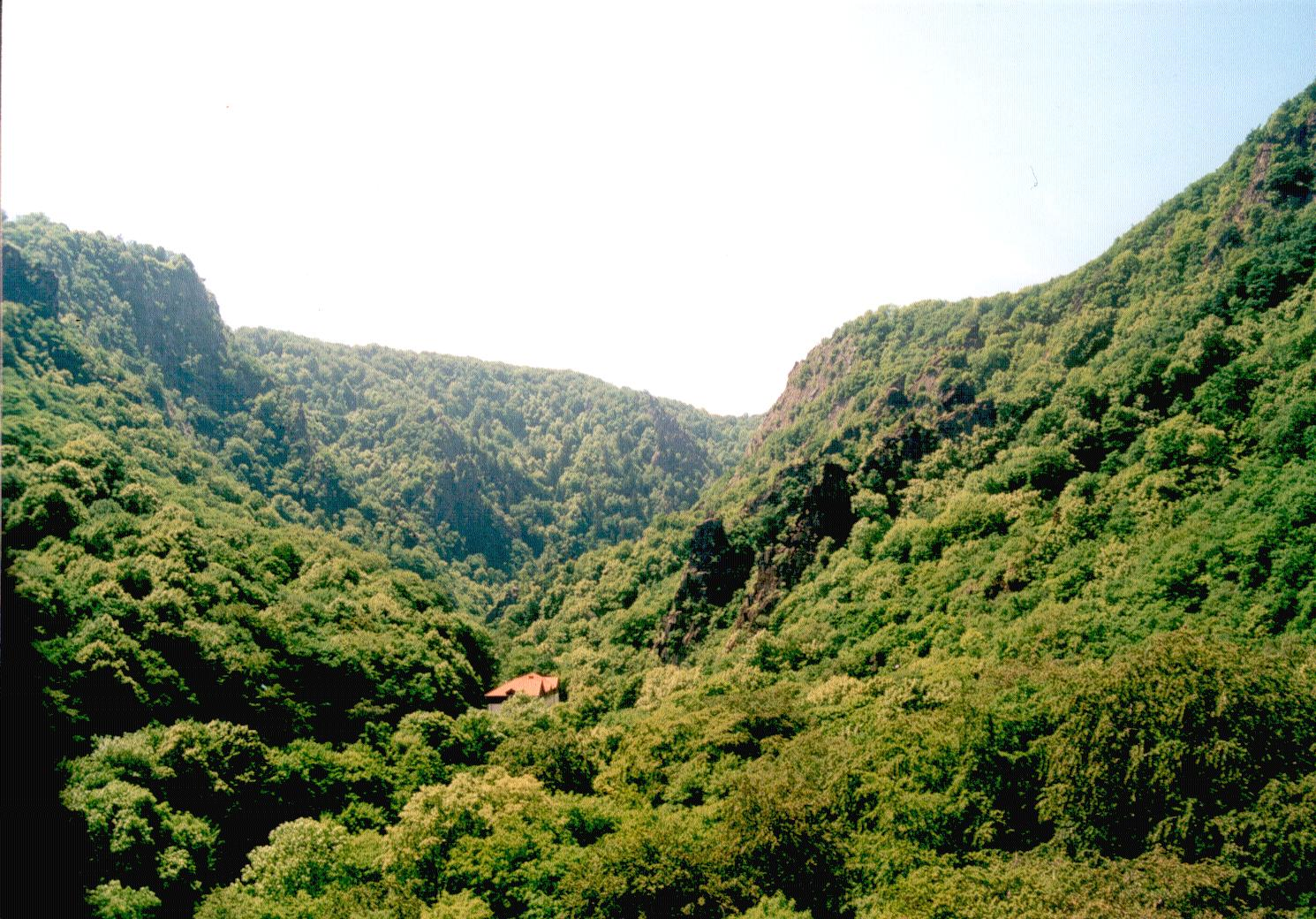
View from the cable car to the Hexentanzplatz over the entry of the Bode into the ravine. The Goethe Cliffs (Goethefelsen) are in the foreground.

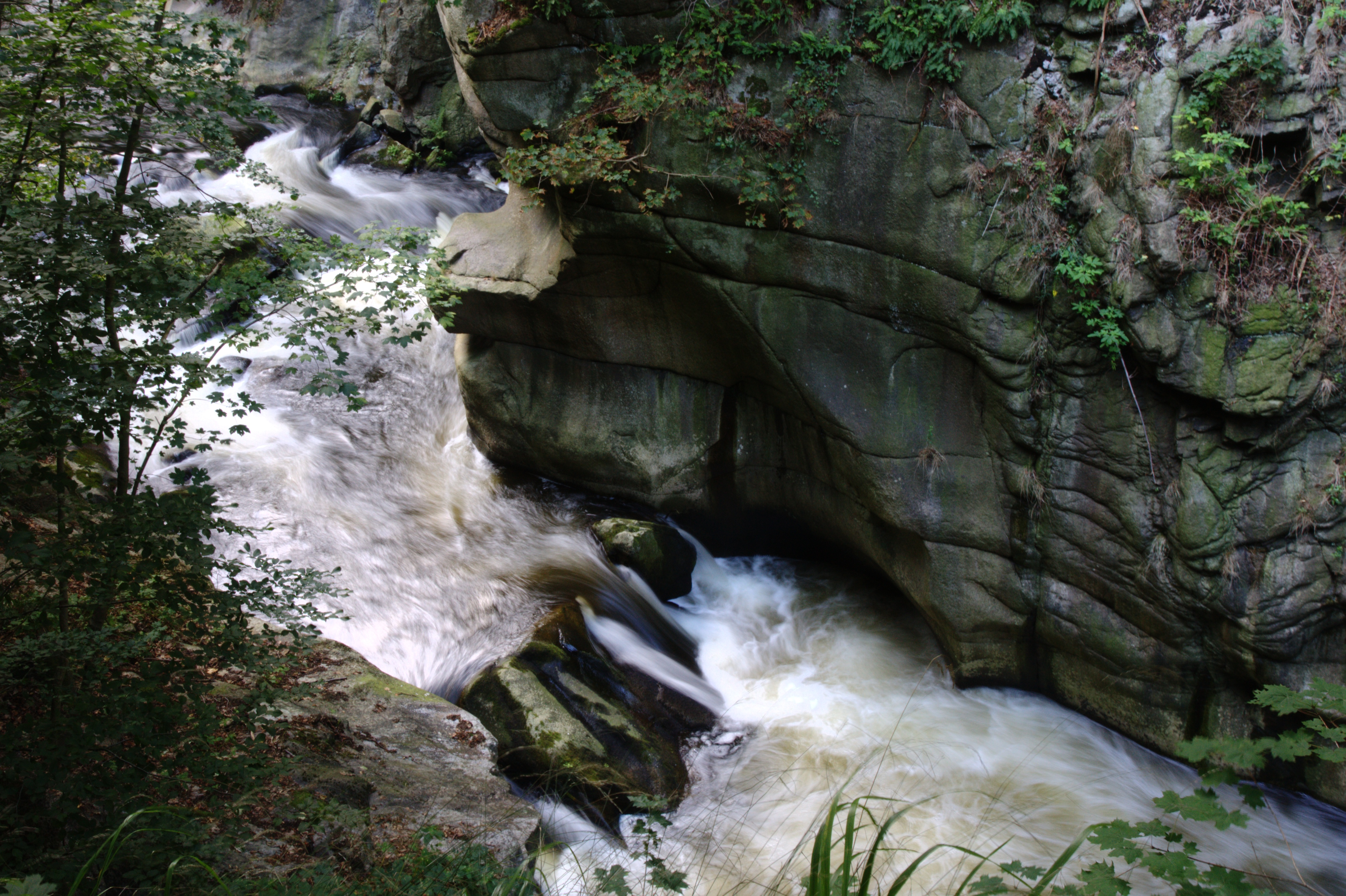
The Bodekessel

The following places of interest are listed in the order they occur along the Bode Gorge from Thale to Treseburg.

- Katersteg: a bridge by the youth hostel (a former hotel dating to 1845) and the Waldkater Café. Legend has it that this was the spot where a hunter spared a wine adulterer who had been turned into a tomcat by a spell. As a reward he received a hoard of treasure which he used to build the inn.
- Schallhöhle: in 1760 a walkway, roughly 20 metres long, was hewn out of the rock and the local innkeeper amused his guests by firing gun salutes into it to create echoes. Spring water from the cave was sold as Lebenswasser. Today it is sealed by a grille. A memorial plaque next to the old entrance commemorates Heinrich Reckleben, who owned the inn for many years and eventually lost his hearing as a result of the firing. He died when he was run over by a beer coach.
- Siebenbrüder or Goethefelsen (Seven Brothers or Goethe Rocks): a granite rock formation with a number of pinnacles. According to legend, seven brothers from the Bohemian Forest had been spurned by a woman, so they wanted to rape her on this spot at the entrance to the gorge. As a punishment they were turned into the seven-headed rock formation. The rocks were renamed the Goethe Rocks on the occasion of the 200th anniversary of the birthday of Johann Wolfgang von Goethe on 28 August 1949. During his visit to the Bode Gorge, Goethe had studied the jointing of the rock on a granite block in the river below the rock formation.
- Kronensumpf: a kettle hole in the Bode. According to the Rosstrappe legend this is the spot where the hound, Bodo, guards the crown of Princess Brunhilde.
- Jungfrau, or Großer Kurfürst, and Mönch (Virgin, or Great Elector, and Monk): rock formations in front of the Jungfern Bridge. According to the Rosstrappe legend, a monk turned to stone in fright when he saw Bodo fall into the ravine.
- Jungfern Bridge: a stone bridge by the Gasthof Königsruhe. A legend maintains that only virgins may cross it so that it does not collapse. Later the publican had a bell ring whenever a virgin crossed the bridge.
- Königsruhe: a pub with beer garden and guesthouse in the Hirschgrund in the middle of the Bode ravine. This is where the Jungfern Trail (Jungfernstieg) crosses the Bode and where the narrow section of the gorge begins. There is a view of the Bode rushing over the rocks from the terrace. The group of houses includes the Harz Mountain Rescue hut which is occupied during peak visitor periods. Refreshments were being sold in the Hirschgrund as early as 1820. In 1860 a stone building was erected that initially housed a Konditorei or cake shop. The Hirschgrund is No. 178 the Harzer Wandernadel hiking network.
- Steinerne Kirche: the "Stone Church", a rock formation above the Hirschgrund in the shape of a church tower with adjoining nave. A cross has been erected on the top of the rocks.
- Schurre: a former hunting path that was expanded in 1850, and climbs steeply through 18 hairpin bends up a stone run made of granite, hornfels and diabase to the Rosstrappe.
- Teufelskanzel: "Devil's Pulpit". Rocks above the Bode gorge by the Teufelsbrücke ("Devil's Bridge") above the Blauer Sumpf, the narrowest part of the Bode Gorge. It was from here, according to legend, the devil spoke to witches.
- Bodekessel: a kettle hole in the Bode by the Teufelsbrücke. Legend has it that it was formed as follows: the Germanic god, Wasur (eternal circulation of the waters), broke through the rock wall that once linked the Hexentanzplatz and the Rosstrappe, in order to save Wotan from the wrath of his father, Hodir. He paved the way for the Bode and created the Bodekessel. Wotan was consequently placed on the throne of the gods. In fact the kettle hole had been scoured out by a low waterfall that was explosively demolished in 1784 to enable timber rafts to use the Bode.
- Langer Hals: "Long Neck". A river loop on the Bode that extends some distance to the north. The Langer Hals takes the Bode around a hard rock mass made of hornfels and diabase. In the knotenschiefer region the valley widens again.

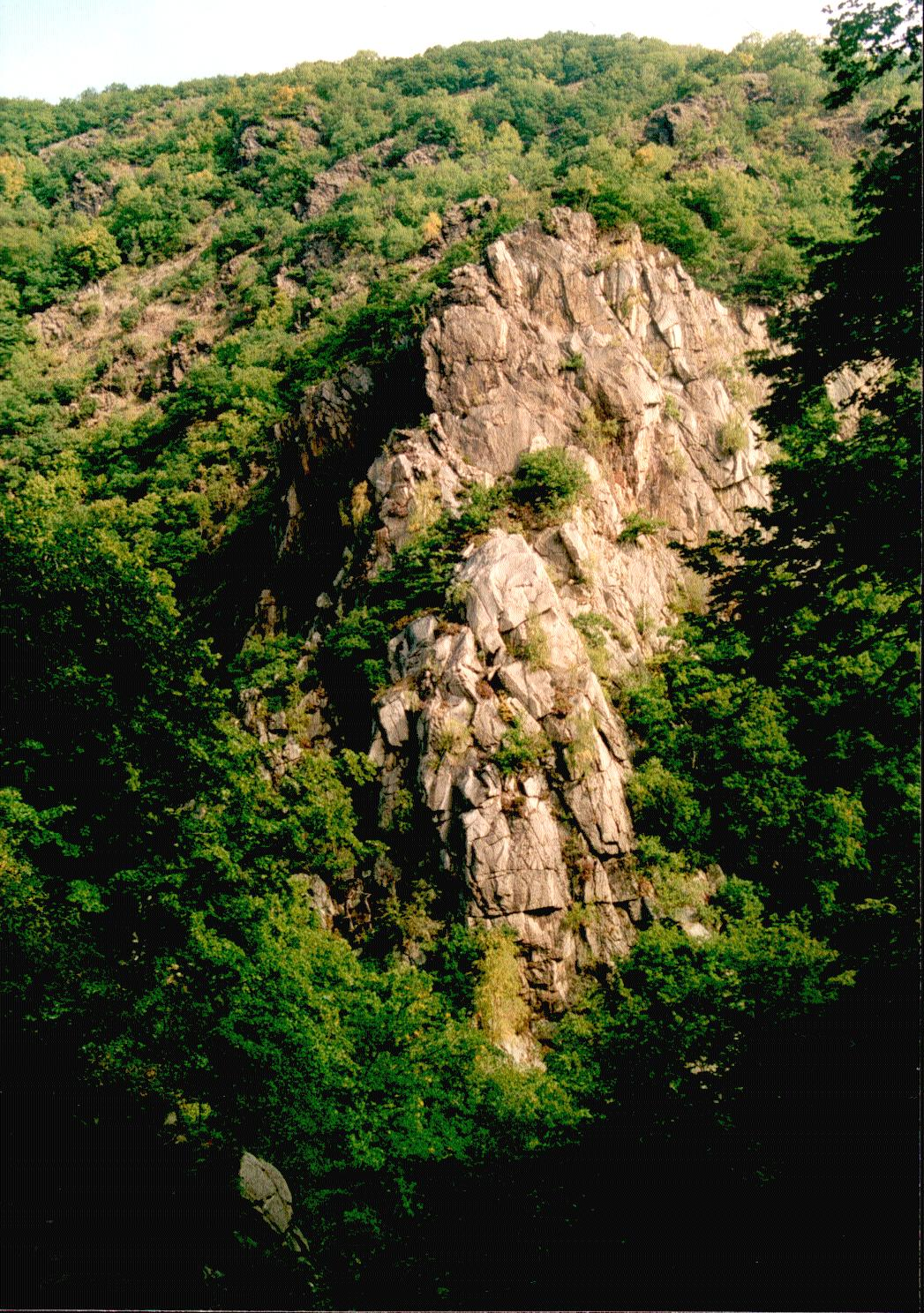
Cliffs at Langer Hals in the Bode Gorge

- Prinzensicht: "Prince's View", a rock formation with a stone run above the Bode Gorge, that can only be reached along the plateau trail. The viewing point is No. 70 in the Harzer Wandernadel.
- La Vieres Höhe: A viewing point near the Hexentanzplatz and zoo (Tierpark) that is No. 72 in the Harzer Wandernadel.
- Gewitterklippen: a rock outcrop of hard, lime silicate hornfels and diabase, which forces the Bode to describe a further loop.
- Bodegang: several quartz-porphyry lodes 3 to 8 metres wide cross the valley in various places. First described by the geologist, K. A. Lossen.
- Kästental: ("Box Valley") A small side valley of the Bode with a little waterfall that was named after the old yew trees (Old High German: Kästen ~ "boxes") that occur there.
- Pfeil Monument: near the Dambachhaus, not far from the Bode Gorge, is a monument that commemorates the forestry scientist, Friedrich Wilhelm Leopold Pfeil. The monument is No. 68 in the Harzer Wandernadel.

=== Notable visitors ===
- Friedrich Gottlieb Klopstock (1771)
- Johann Wolfgang von Goethe (1784)
- Alexander von Humboldt (1790)
- Friedrich Freiherr von Hardenberg, named "Novalis" (1797)
- Joseph von Eichendorff (1805)
- Theodor Fontane (1848 and 1868)

== Sources ==
- Kirsch, Falko: Führer durch das Bodetal. Geschichte, Geologie, Sagen, Flora, Fauna. Thale
- Oelsner, Manfred: Bodetal. 5. Auflage. Tourist-Verlag, Berlin 1991, ISBN 3-350-00225-0
