= Hotel Waldkater =

Hotel in Germany

Coordinates: 51°44′15″N 11°01′28″E

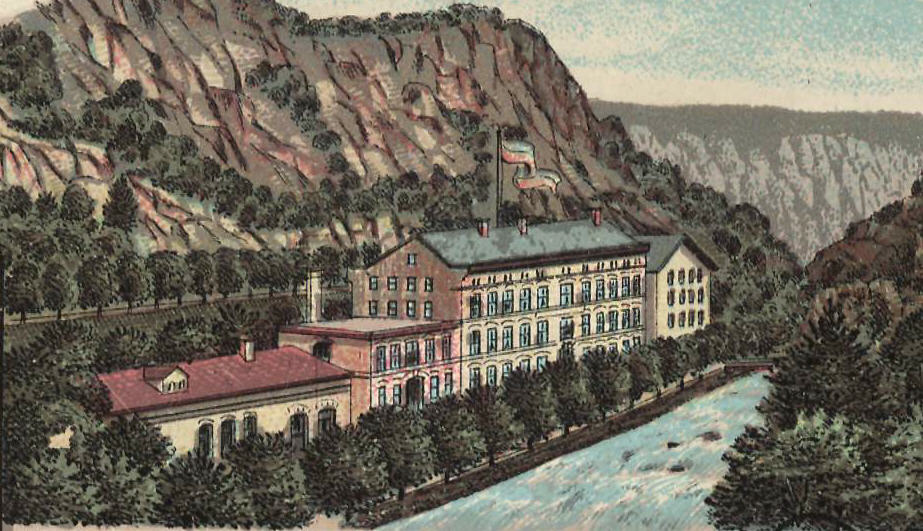
The Waldkater in 1897

The Hotel Waldkater was a famous hotel in the Bode Gorge in the Harz Mountains of Germany.

== History ==
The first establishment called Waldkater ("wildcat") was built in 1845 and subsequently altered many times. The name goes back to a story, according to which a wine adulterator had been changed into a cat as a punishment. Before it was shot by a hunter the cat was supposed to have been saved by revealing a recipe for a May Day drink (Maitrank). But because this drink was also adulterated and caused the hunter to have a hangover, the adulterator had to be saved again and now showed the hunter a hidden treasure. With this capital the hunter built the hotel as well as a monument to the adulterator.

Less romantic is the story that a carter named Christoph Fessel originally built a small refreshment hut in the Bode Gorge that was soon replaced by the one-story Kleiner Waldkater. In 1852 the Großer Waldkater Hotel was added, that together with the Rosstrappe, Hexentanzplatz and Zehnpfund became one of the most famous hotels in the area.

The Großer Waldkater later became a rest home and was then converted into a youth hostel which was renovated in 1996. The Kleiner Waldkater was used after the Second World War initially as a residence for evacuees and, later, as a works holiday home for Naumburg furniture workers. After the Wende it was turned back into a hotel.

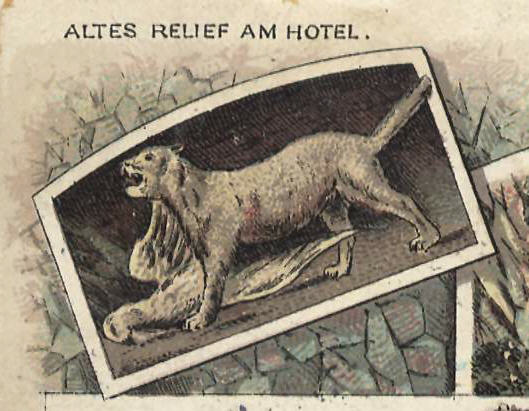
The wildcat relief

== The Waldkater near Fontane ==
Theodor Fontane visited Thale and the surrounding area several times and made the Bode Gorge an important setting for his novel, Cécile. In the twelfth chapter of this novel, the protagonists plan an afternoon excursion from Thale; whereby the Waldkater is also mentioned: "Non not the Bode Gorge," said Gordon. "Especially that infernal Waldkater! That old country house on the roadway which reeks of cooking and stable smells. Everywhere people and butter paper, cripples and accordions. No, no, I suggest Lindenberg."

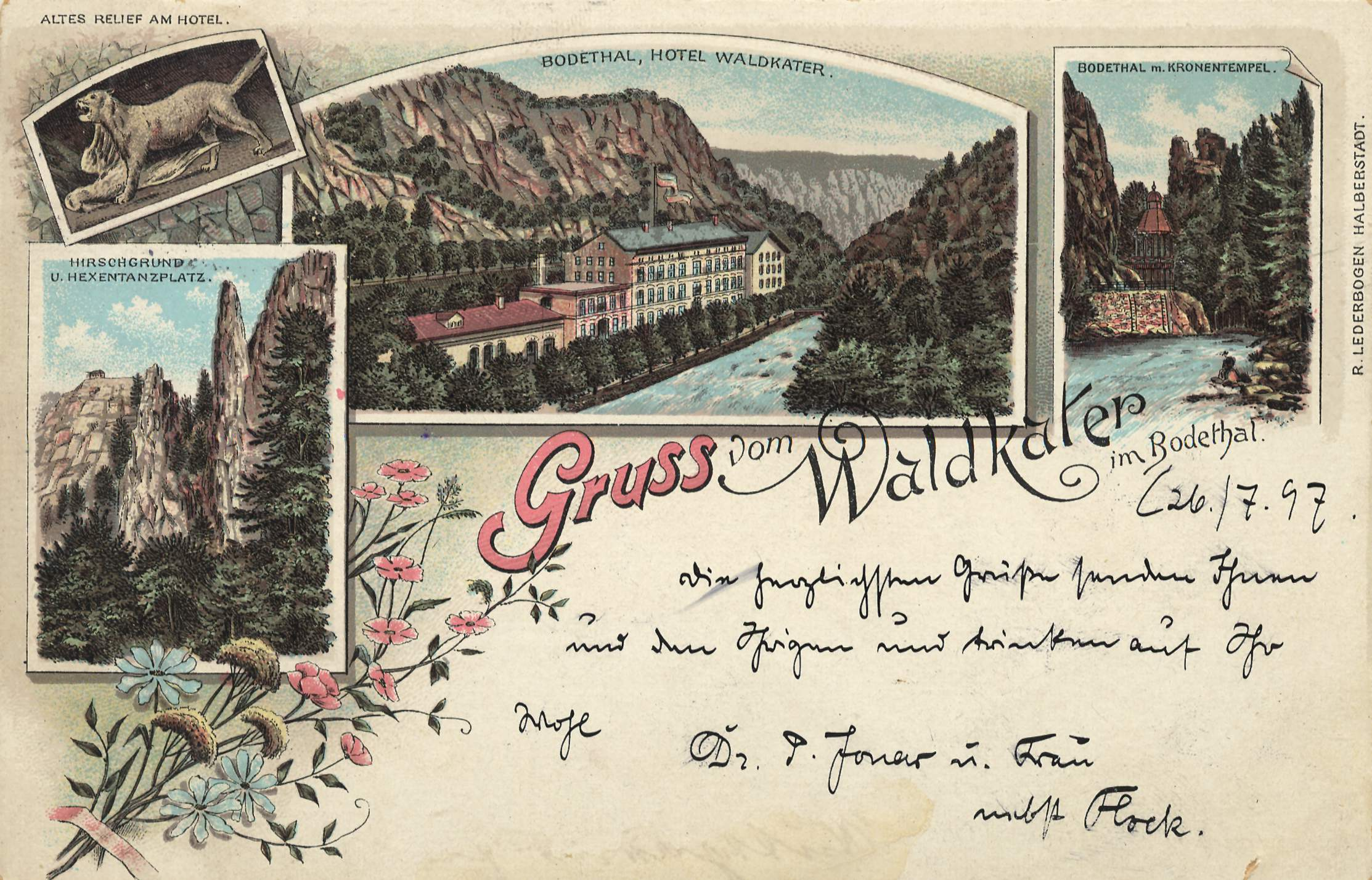
1897 postcard

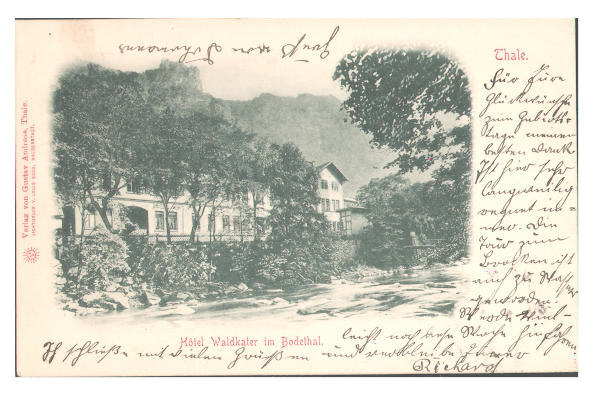
1902 postcard
