= Rosstrappe Chair Lift =

Coordinates: 51°44′33″N 11°01′34″E

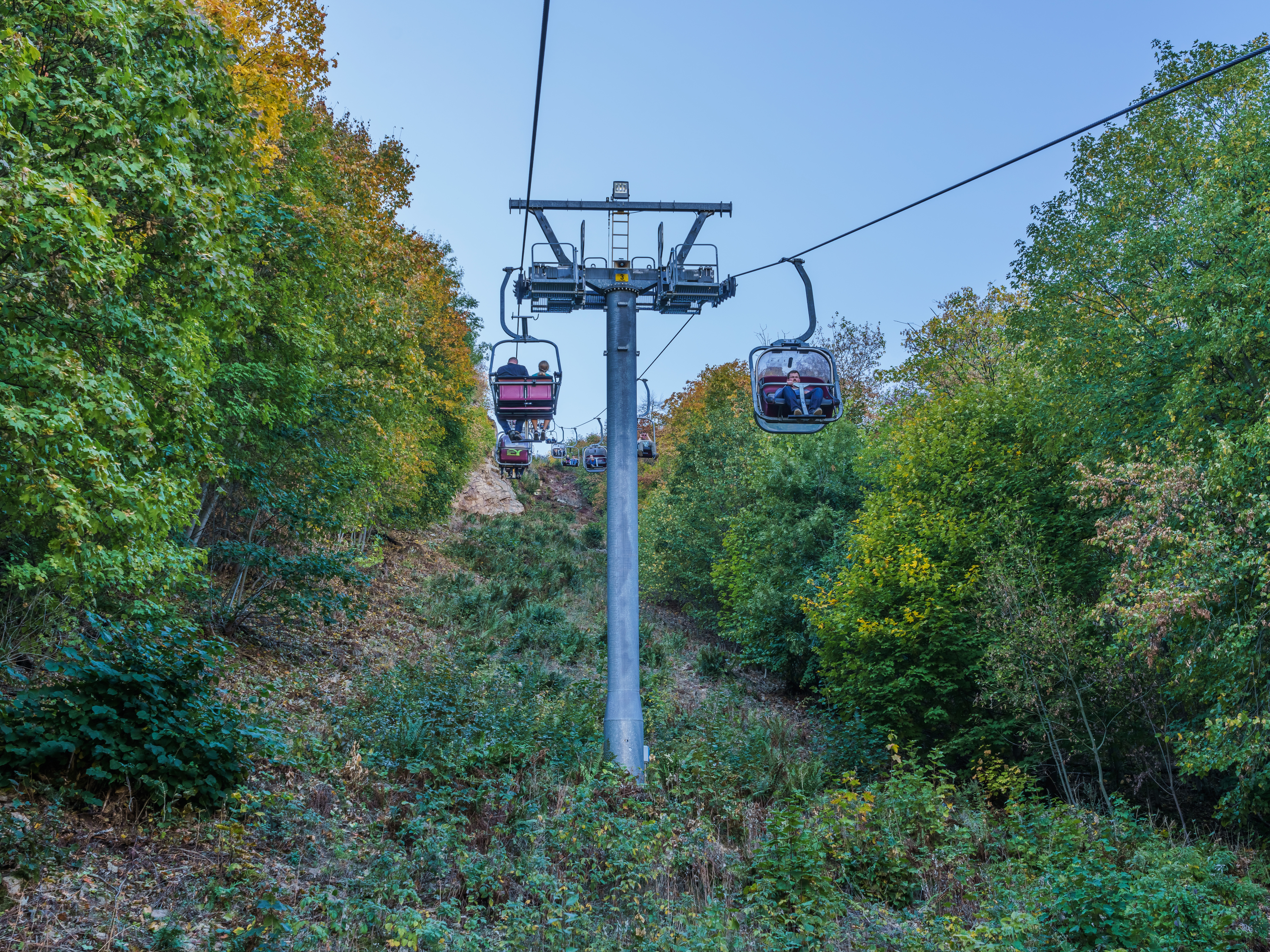
Roßtrappe Chair Lift

The Rosstrappe Chair Lift (German: Rosstrappe-Sessellift) is a 559-metre-long single-seater chairlift built in 1980 by the firm of Chrudrim. It runs from Thale in the Bode Gorge taking eight minutes to reach the rock massif of the Roßtrappe.

The Rosstrappe Chair Lift climbs 250 metres over a length of 668 metres. It has over 13 supports. In 2005, the old chairlift was replaced by a new one. The cable used has a diameter of 28 mm and it is driven by a 40 kW engine in the valley station. The Rosstrappe Chair Lift can transport up to 400 people per hour.
