= Schurre =

Stone run in Saxony-Anhalt, Germany

Coordinates: 51°44′14″N 11°00′58″E

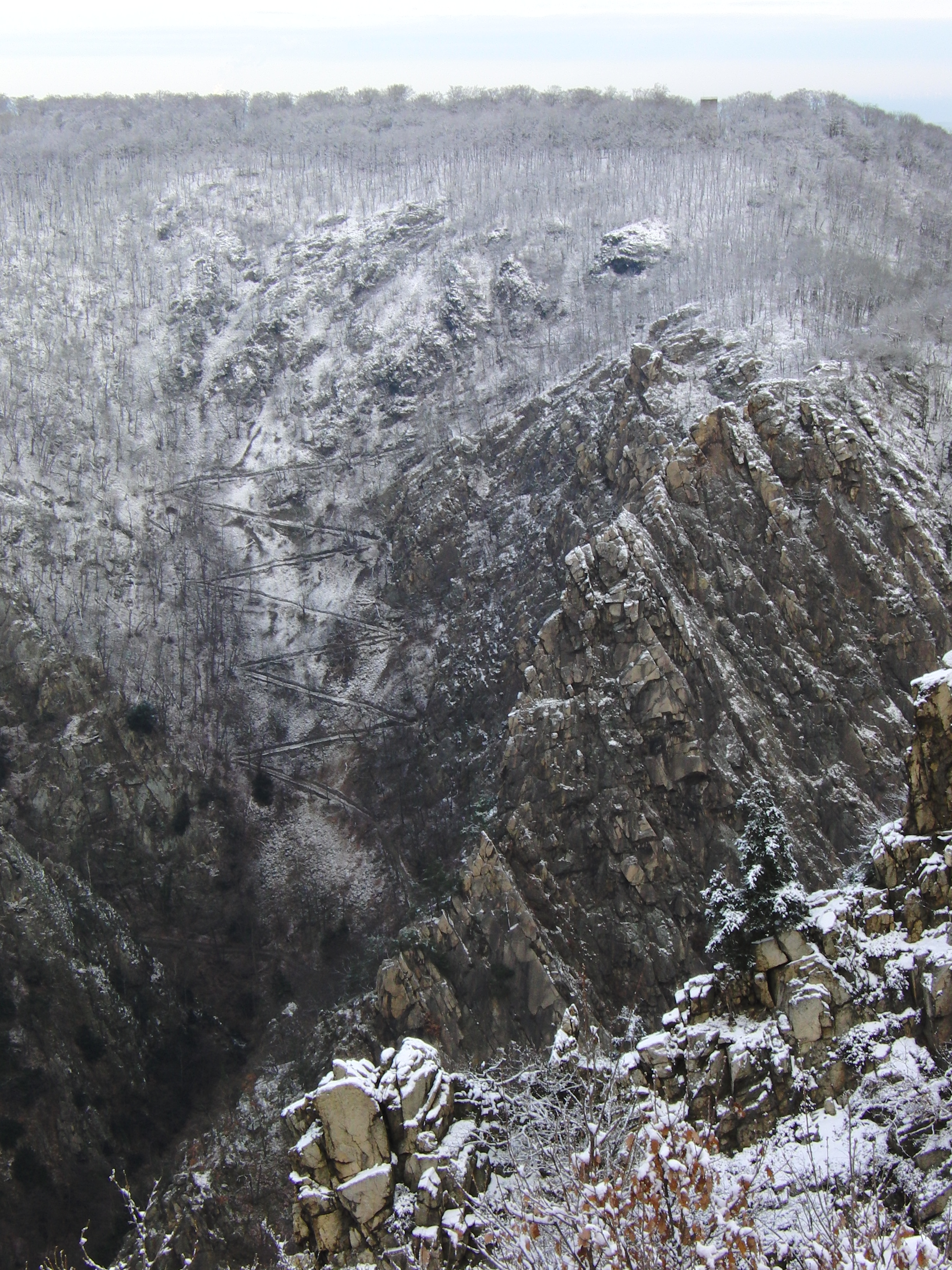
The Schurre today

The Schurre (pronounced "shoorer") is a stone run in the Bode Gorge in the Lower Harz near Thale in Saxony-Anhalt, Germany. The stone run is slowly slipping downhill, the sliding of its boulders being audible especially during periods of heavy rain.

Its name has been given to a much-frequented trail, blazed in 1864 between the Bode Gorge and the legendary Rosstrappe site. In 18 hairpin bends the Schurre wends its way up the steep stone run. The trail has been extensively developed and is cobbled in places. Several trees planted along the route, with its extreme climatic conditions, have survived.In May 2010 there was a rockslide that led to the path being closed for several months. The path was also closed in summer 2011 due to another major rockslide.

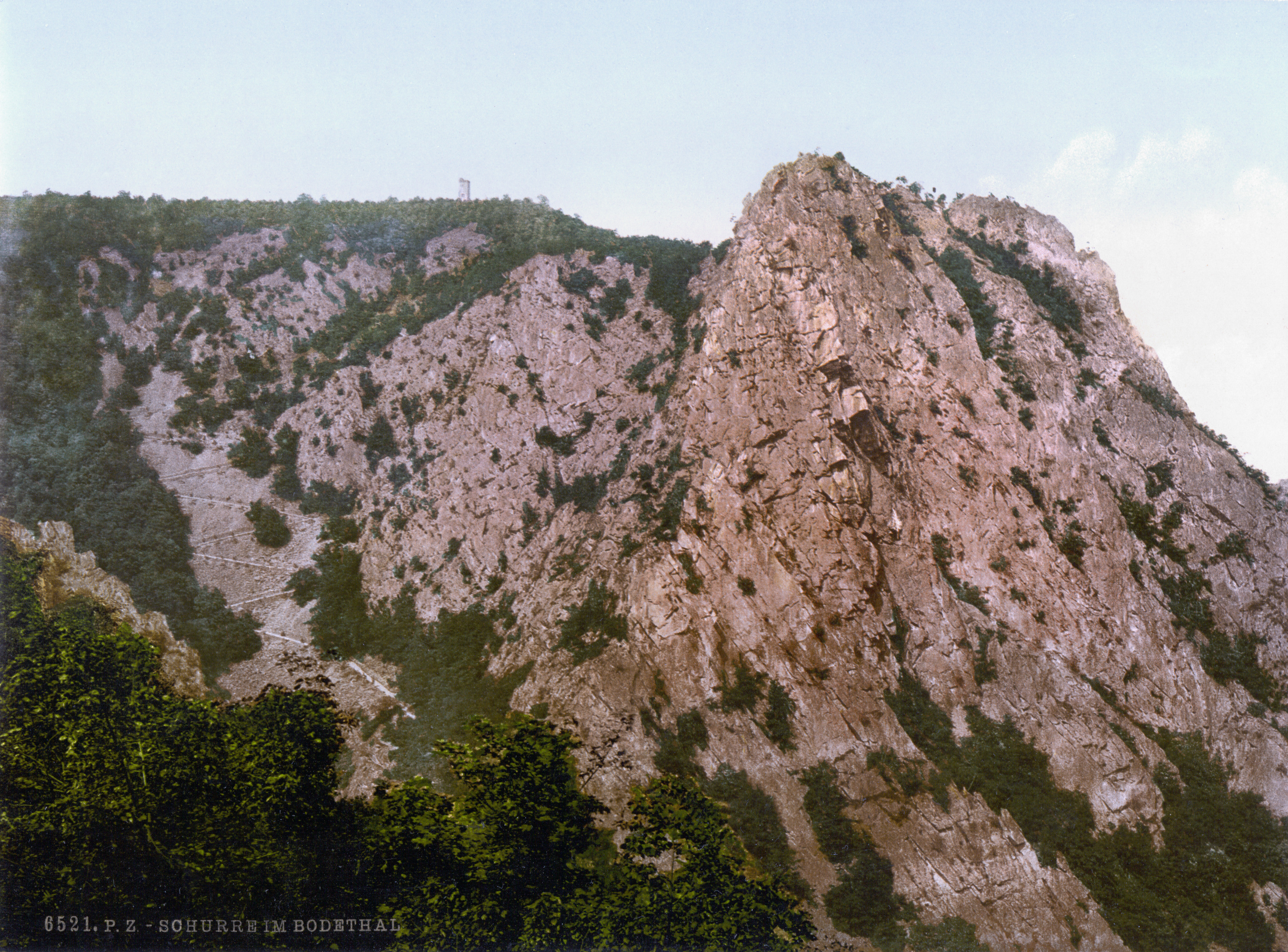
The Schurre between the Rosstrappe and the Bode Gorge (around 1900)

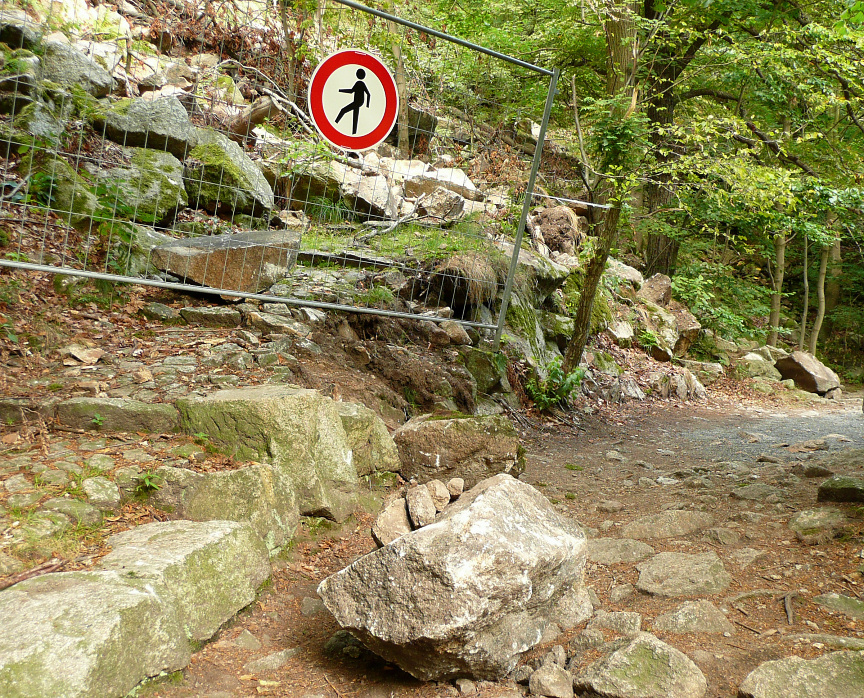
The Schurre near the Bode, closed due to a rockslide in 2010
