= Knotenschiefer =

Variety of spotted slate

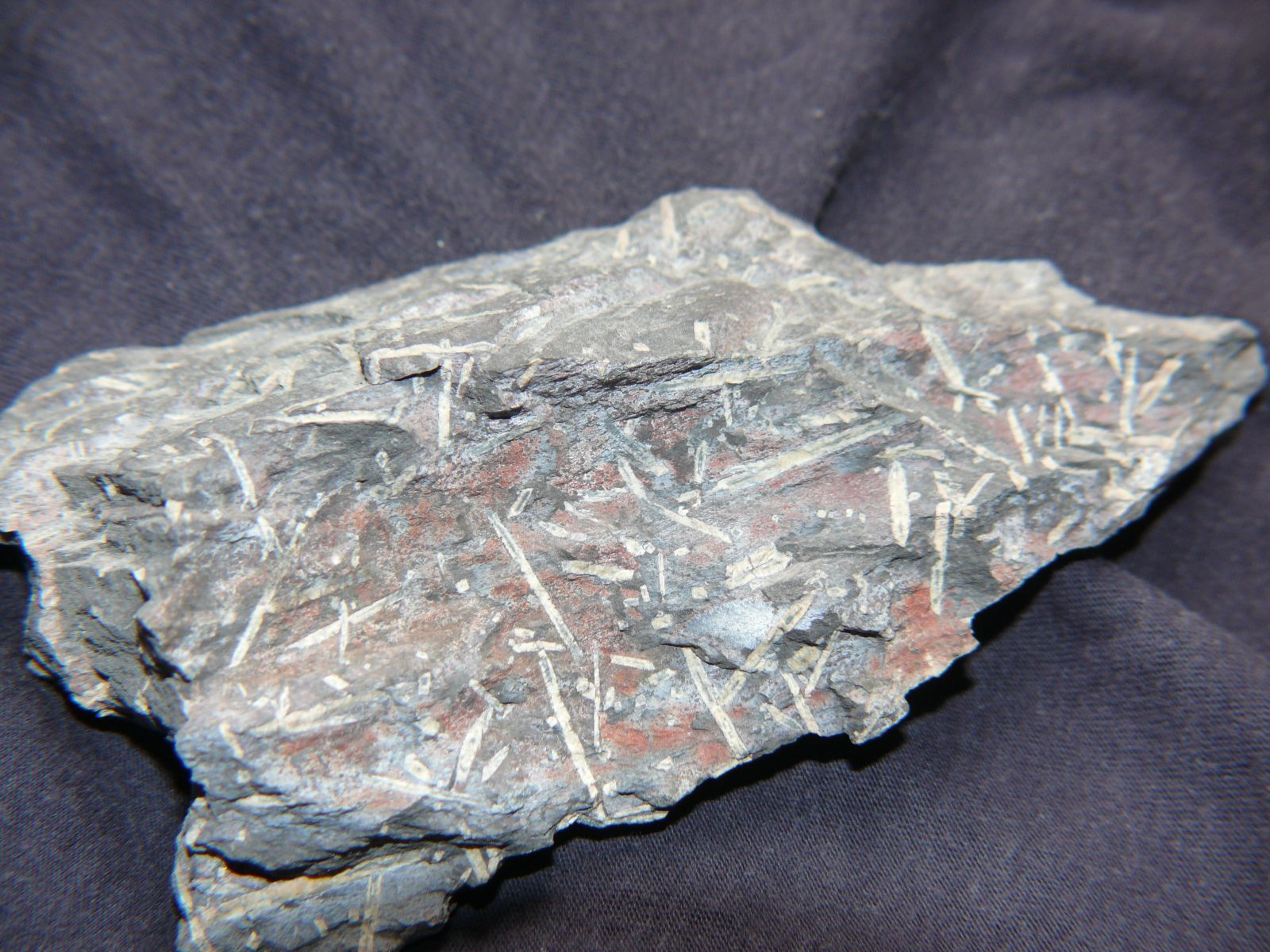
Knotenschiefer containing andalusite

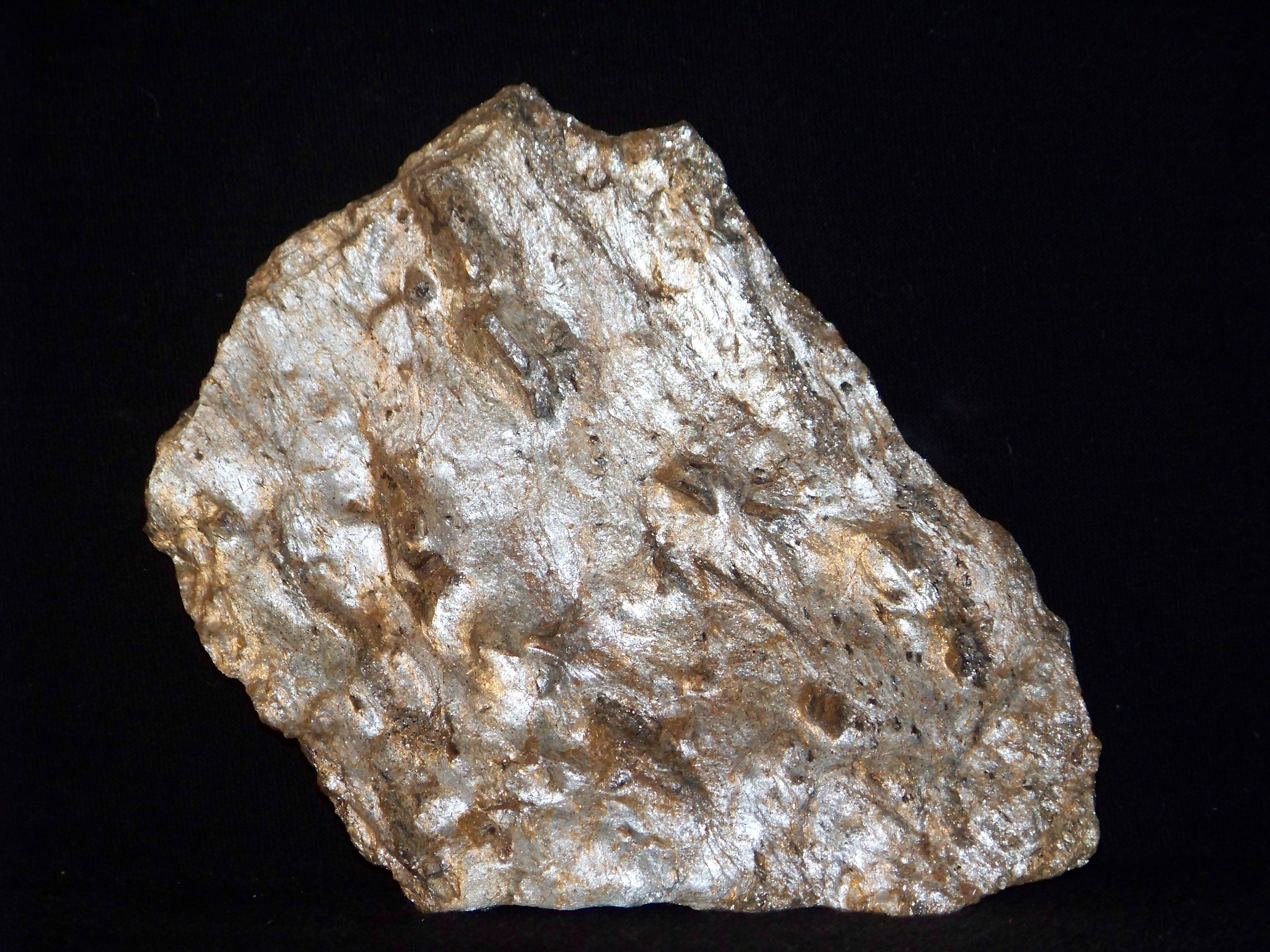
Knotenschiefer from Głuchołazy, Oppa Mountains, Poland

Knotenschiefer is a variety of spotted slate characterized by conspicuous subspherical or polyhedral clots that are often individual minerals such as cordierite, biotite, chlorite, andalusite and others.

Like fleckschiefer, fruchtschiefer and garbenschiefer, knotenschiefer is a variety of contact metamorphic slate. It is formed at temperatures of around 400 °C and its dark coloration is caused by graphite. Fruchtschiefer occurs at 500 °C. Knotenschiefer is characterised by small nodules, up to one centimetre in size, and nodular deposits of mica as a result of the growth in grain size during metamorphism. The nodules consist of iron minerals, carbon substances and mica; as the metamorphic temperature rises, minerals such as andalusite or chiastolite increasingly occur.
