= Snowy mespilus =

Snowy mespilus refers to species of trees or shrubs in the genus Amelanchier:

- Amelanchier lamarckii
- Amelanchier ovalis
