= Fruchtschiefer =

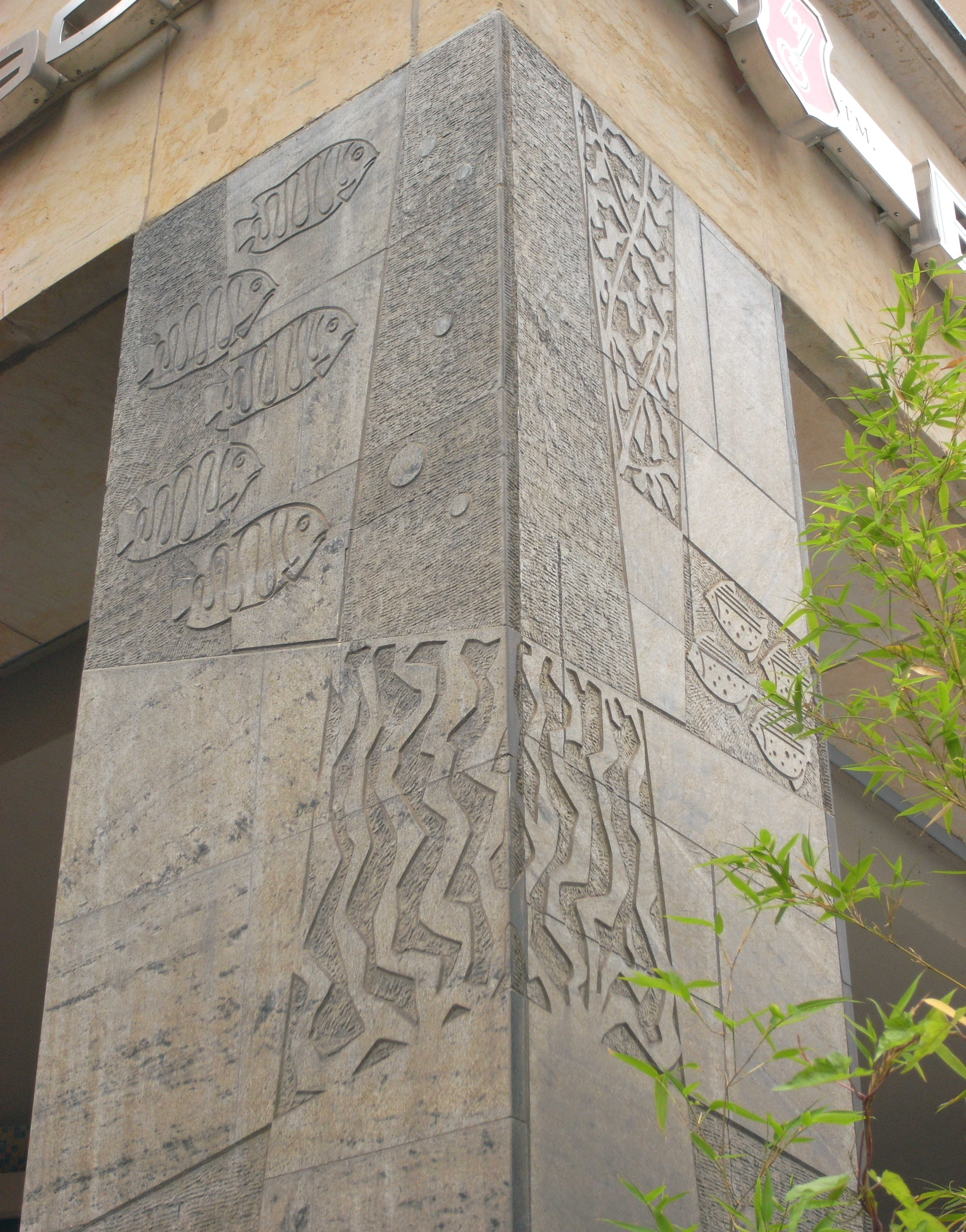
Artistic sculpture using Theuma Fruchtschiefer on a column (around 1960)

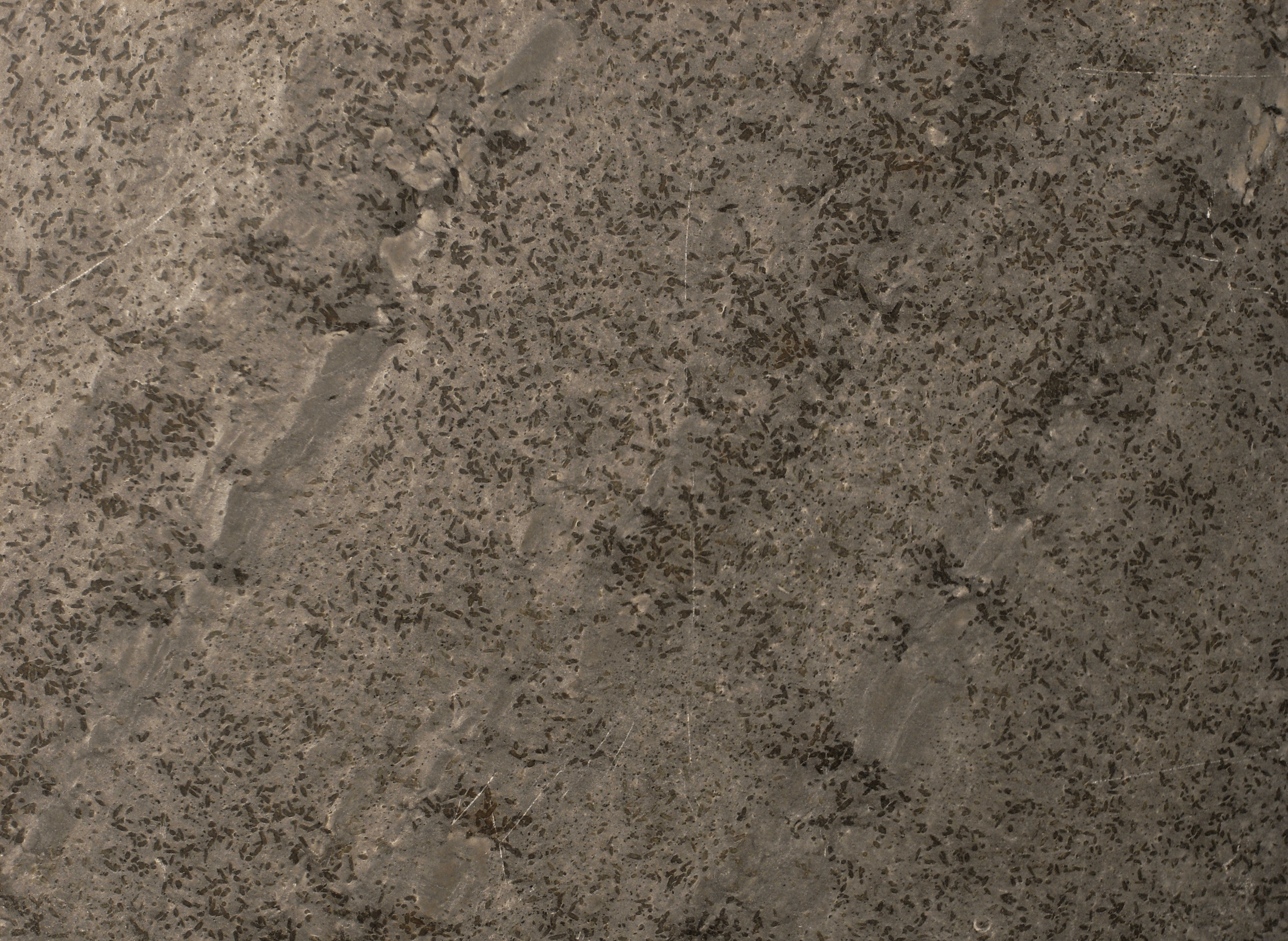
Theuma Fruchtschiefer, ground surface

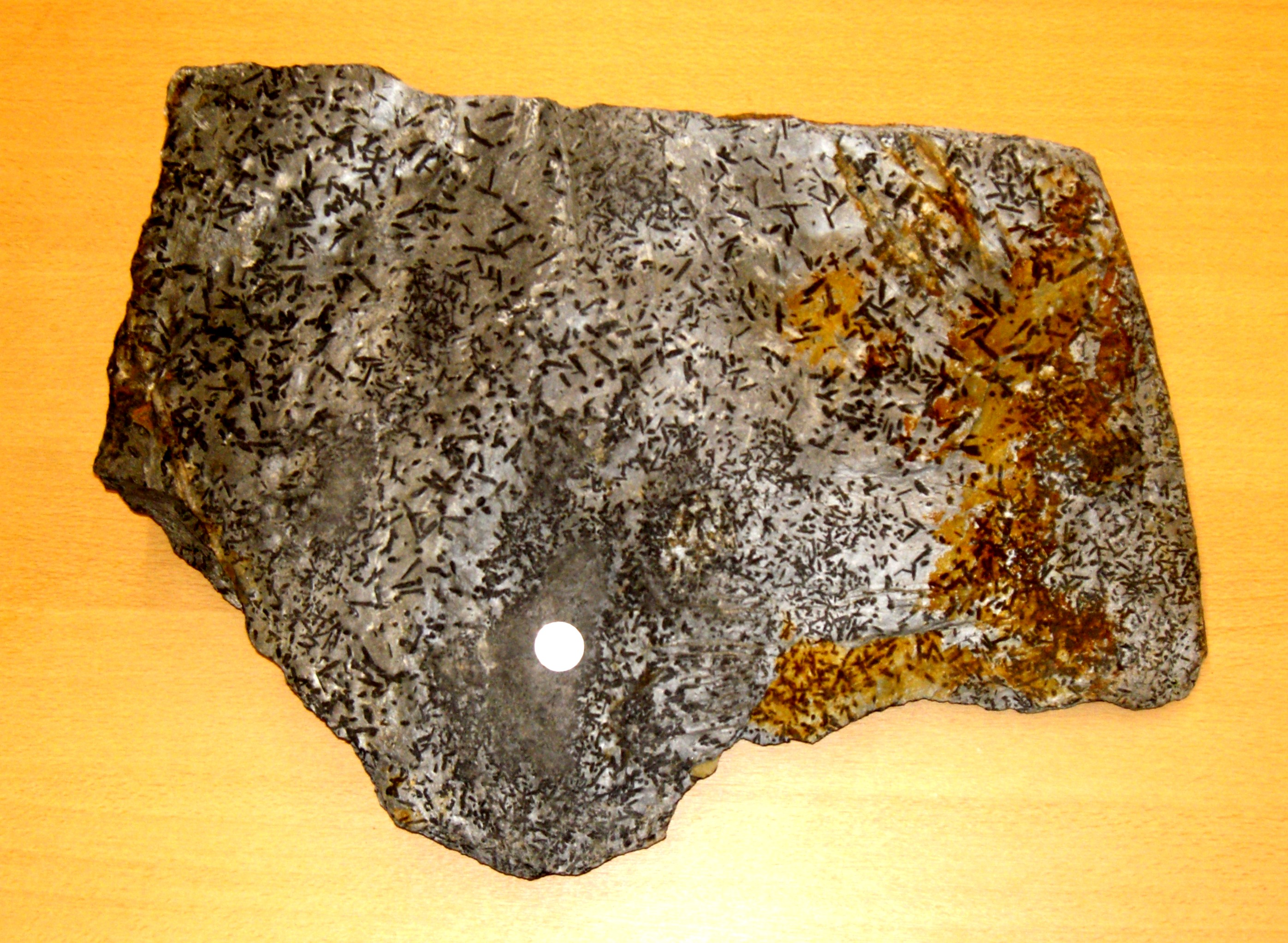
Fruchtschiefer with cordierite porphyroblasts

Fruchtschiefer is a local variety of contact metamorphic rock that is derived from argillite.

== Formation and mineral content ==
Fruchtschiefer is formed under very low pressure (low grade metamorphic rock) and temperatures of ca. 500 °C. At these temperatures cordierite grows to the size of grains of corn, which is where its name comes from; Frucht being German for "corn" (as well as "fruit"). It contains the following minerals: cordierite, muscovite, potassium feldspar, quartz, biotite and hornblende.

== Occurrence ==
Fruchtschiefer occurs in Germany as contact metamorphic rock in the Harz, Ore Mountains, Odenwald and Vogtland. The best known deposits are those near Theuma and Tirpersdorf. Their protoliths originate from the Ordovician period. Rocks quarried here have been used well beyond the local region.

== Use ==
The main traditional application is in the form of rough split masonry products of a wide variety. Fruchtschiefer from Theuma is also split or ground for use as facade slabs and plinth facings. Amongst the architectural components made in this material are window and door surrounds, columns and steps. Occasionally it is used for artistic or sculptural purposes. It was also used as canal lock and well covers as well as containers for galvanised baths and acids.

The use of Theuma Fruchtschiefer can be traced back to the Middle Ages. Examples include slabs in the crypt of St. John's Church in Plauen (built 1122), which date to the 14th century.

== Bibliography ==
- Georg Dehio: Handbuch der Deutschen Kunstdenkmäler, Sachsen. Munich, Berlin (Deutscher Kunstverlag) 1990 ISBN 3-422-03016-6
- Carl Gäbert, Alexander Steuer, Karl Weiss: Die nutzbaren Gesteinsvorkommen Deutschlands. Berlin (Union Dt. Verl.ges) 1915
- Horst Fröhlich (Red.): Plauen und das mittlere Vogtland. Werte unserer Heimat Vol. 44. Berlin (Akademie-Verlag) 1986
- Walter Maresch, Olaf Medenbach: Gesteine. p. 252, Mosaik Verlag, Munich, 1987, ISBN 3-576-10699-5.
