= Roßtrappe =

Granite crag in the Harz mountains of central Germany

Coordinates: 51°44′06″N 11°01′04″E

The Roßtrappe is a 403-metre-high (1,322 ft) granite crag in the Harz mountains of central Germany.

The Roßtrappe rises over the Bode Gorge in the Harz. It may be reached from Thale by road, on foot or on via the Rosstrappe Chair Lift. On the rocks is a mountain hotel with an observation terrace as well as the upper station for the chair lift. Nearby is the Winzenburg, a refuge castle 25 hectares (62 acres) in area with a 500-metre-long (1,600 ft) rampart made of stone blocks and earth, which has been used since the New Stone Age as a refuge for up to 100 people. In 1860 the Winzenburg Tower was built there; an observation tower which is now closed.

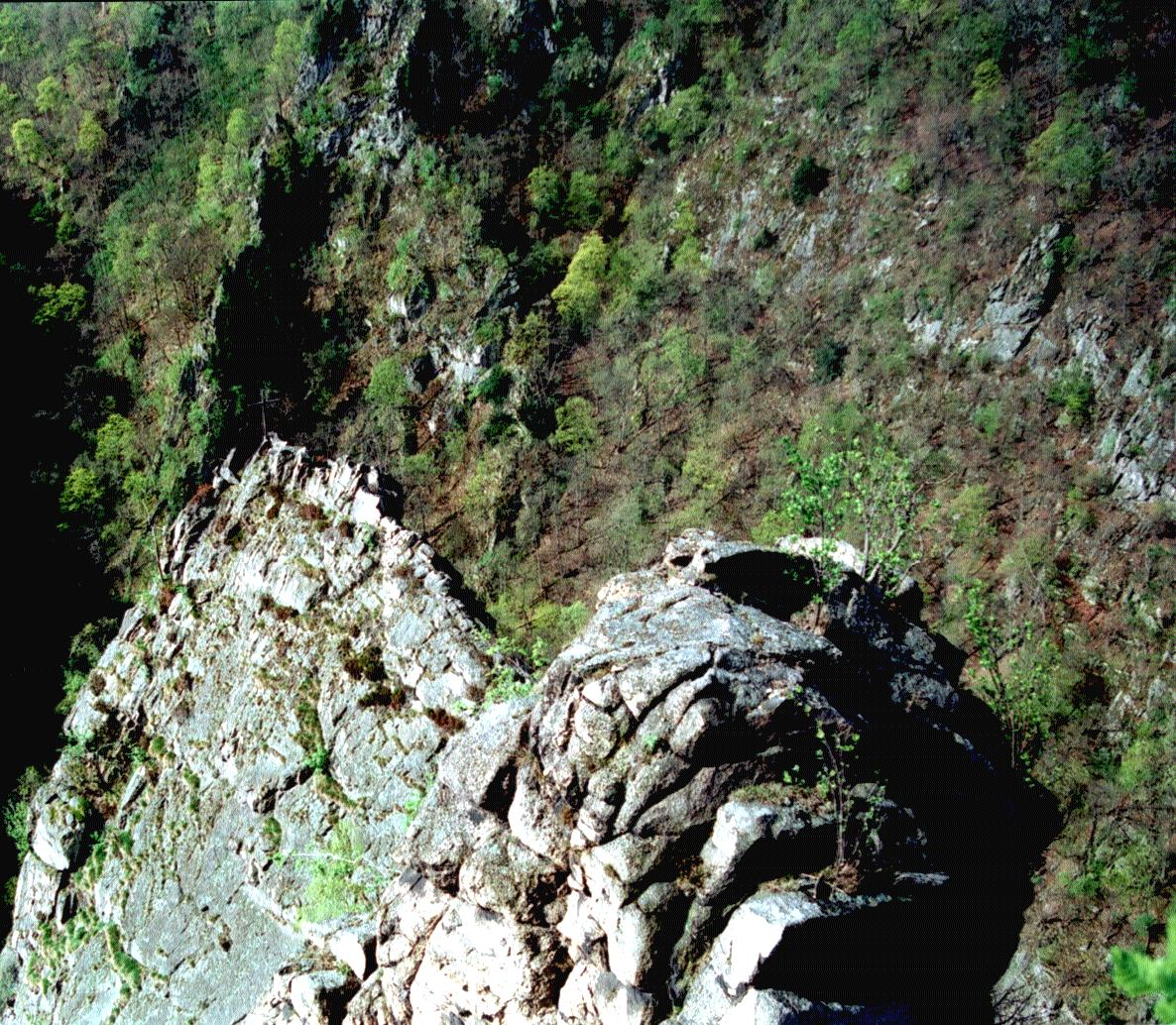
View from the Roßtrappe into the Bode Gorge with the summit cross in the foreground.

From the Rosstrappe there is a view of the rocks on the Hexentanzplatz, ("Witches Dance Floor") the Steinerne Kirche ("Stone Church"), the Bode Gorge, the Harz Foreland, the town of Thale and the highest peak in the Harz, the Brocken.

According to legend, a giant by the name of Bodo once followed the king’s beautiful daughter, Brunhilde, whom he wanted to marry against her will. Brunhilde escaped on a white stallion (German: Ross), but was suddenly confronted by a deep ravine. Her horse leapt in one bound to the rocks on the other side, but her pursuer fell into the depths below. The impression of the horse’s hoof may still be seen today. The giant Bodo gave his name to the small river, the Bode.

Scientists suspect that this imprint in the rock is the weathered remains of a Germanic altar basin.

From the Roßtrappe visitors can climb down into the Bode Gorge on the Schurre, a path laid in zigzags. The President’s Way (Präsidentenweg), about 4 km, is the recommended path to climb from the gorge to the rock outcrop.

The Roßtrappe is no. 71 in the system of check points on the Harzer Wandernadel walking trail network.

Since the middle of the 19th century there has been a mountain hotel with the same name at the entrance to the Roßtrappe.

== Photographs ==
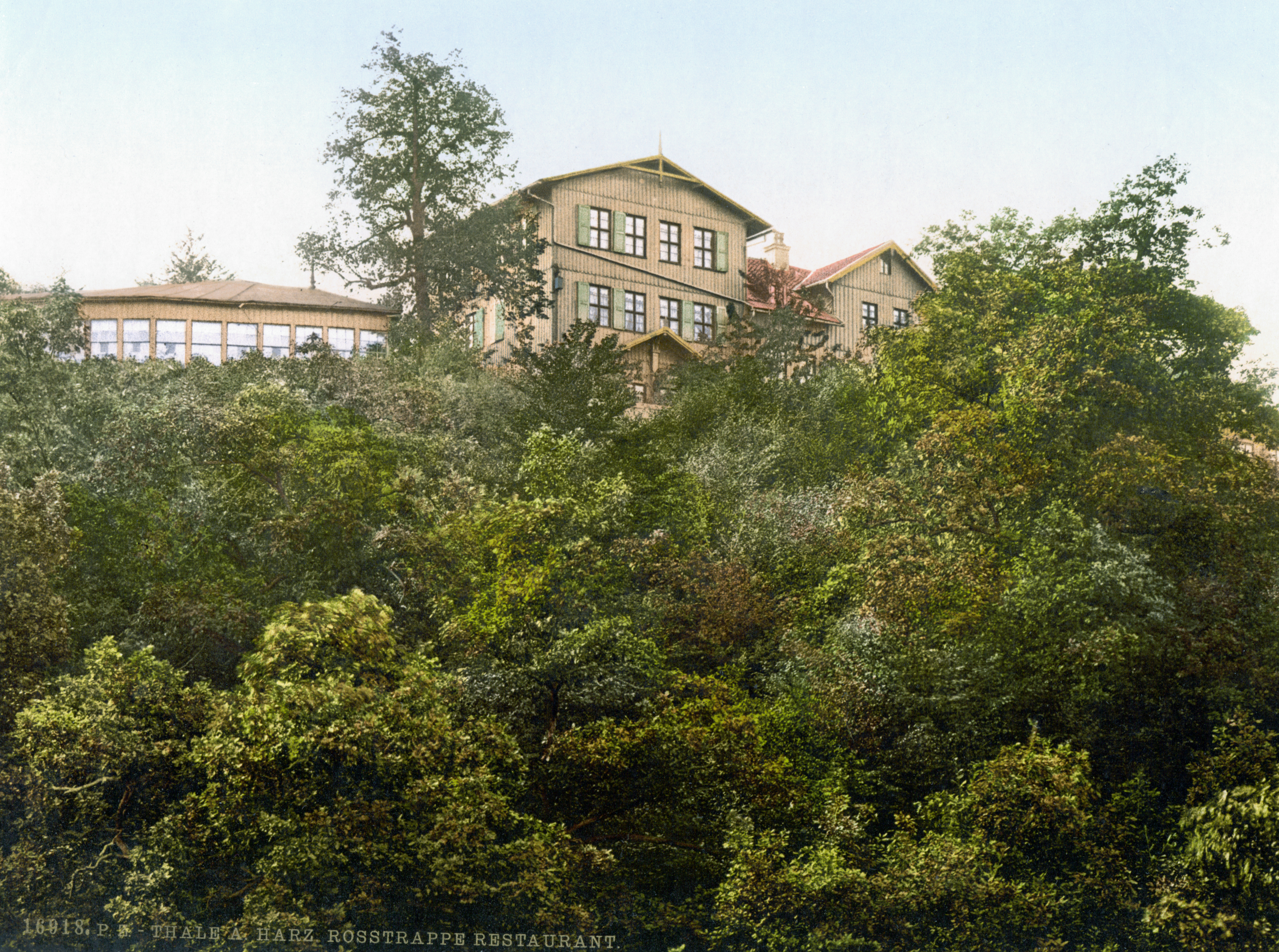
Hotel Roßtrappe around 1900

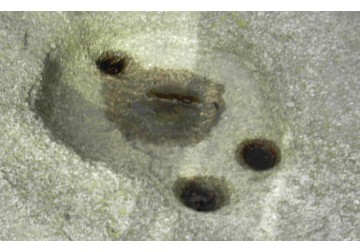
Hoofmark on the Roßtrappe

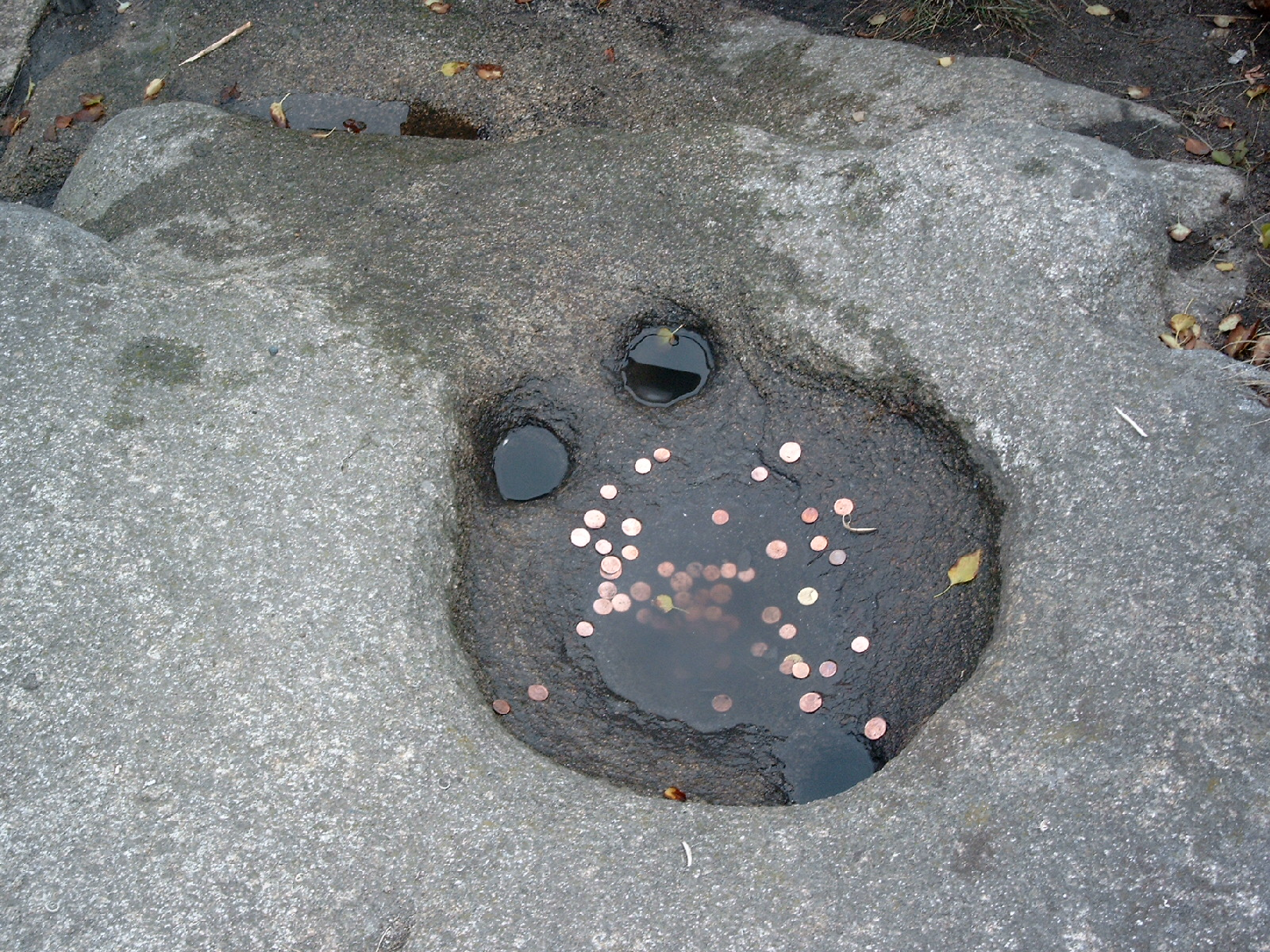
Roßtrappe wishing well

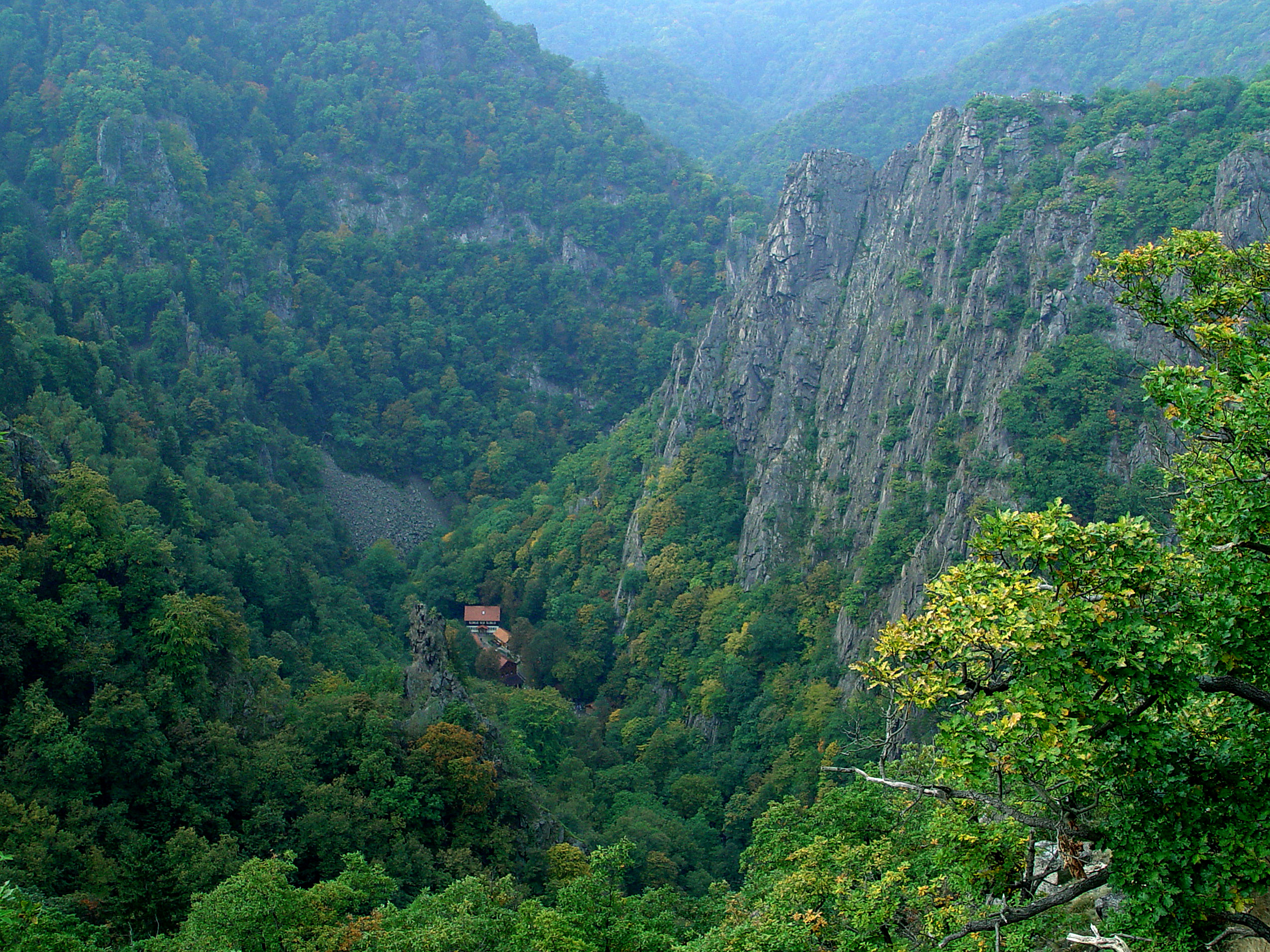
View of the Roßtrappe from the Hexentanzplatz

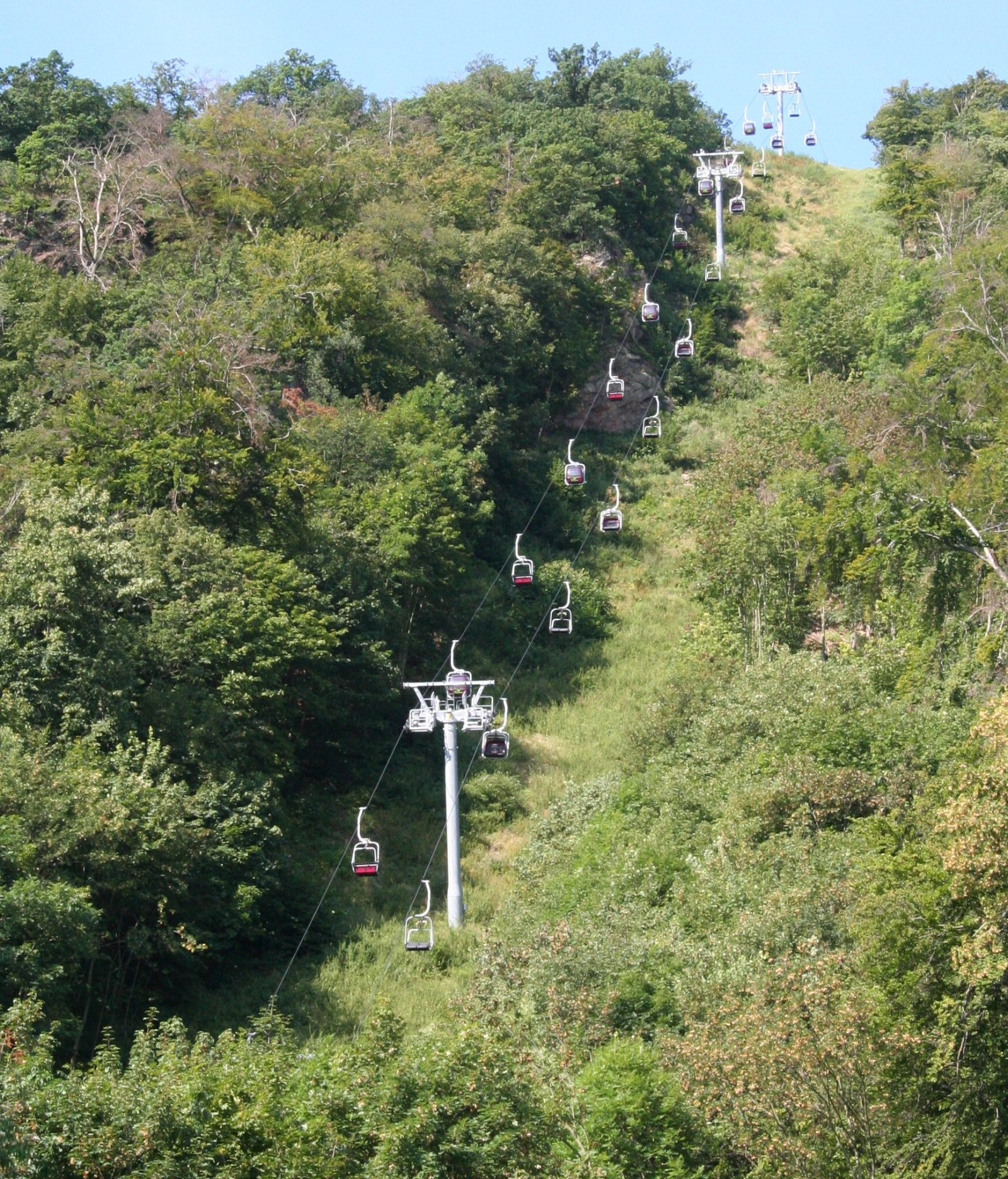
Chair lift to the Roßtrappe

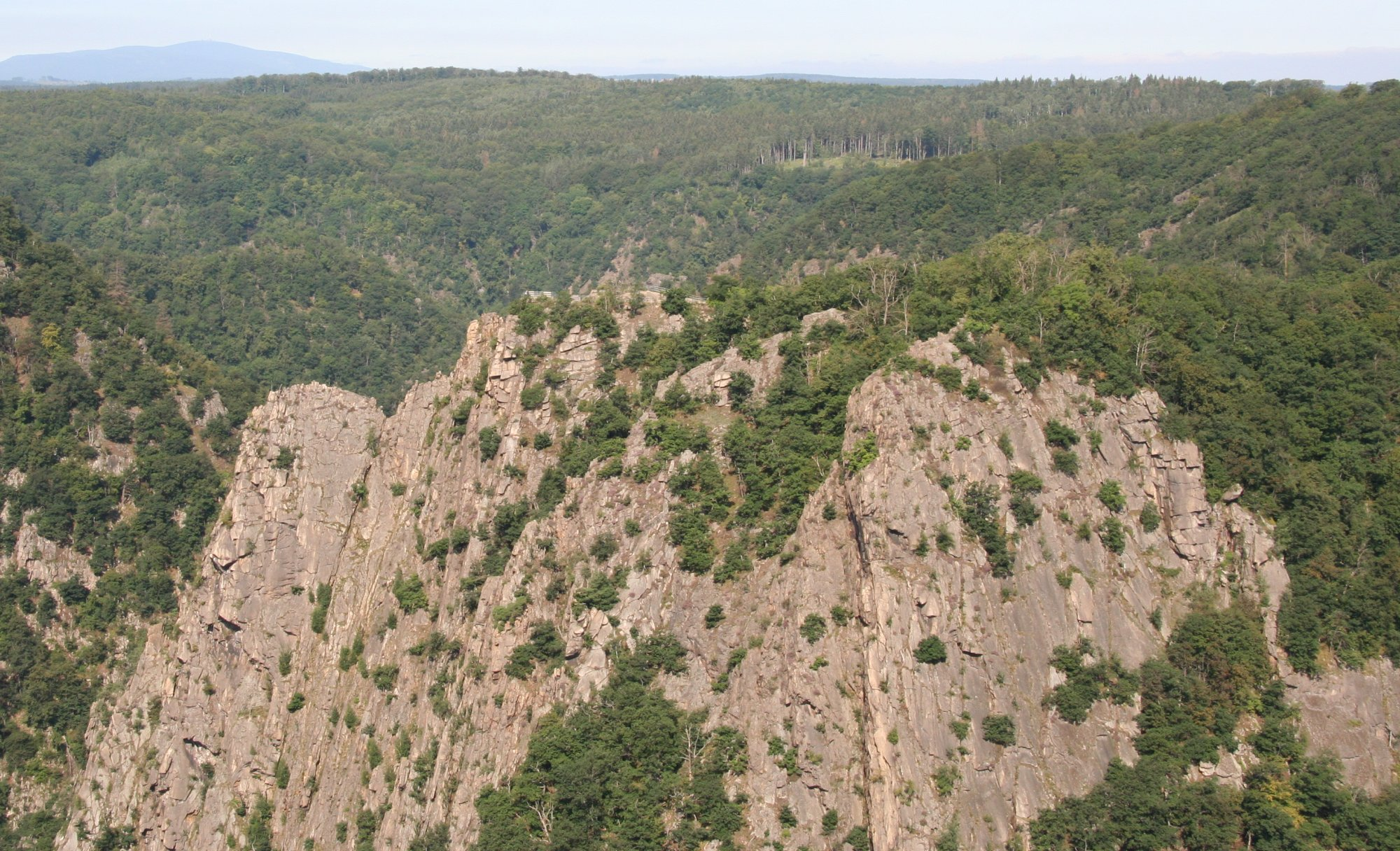
The Roßtrappe massif

== See also ==
- List of rock formations in the Harz
