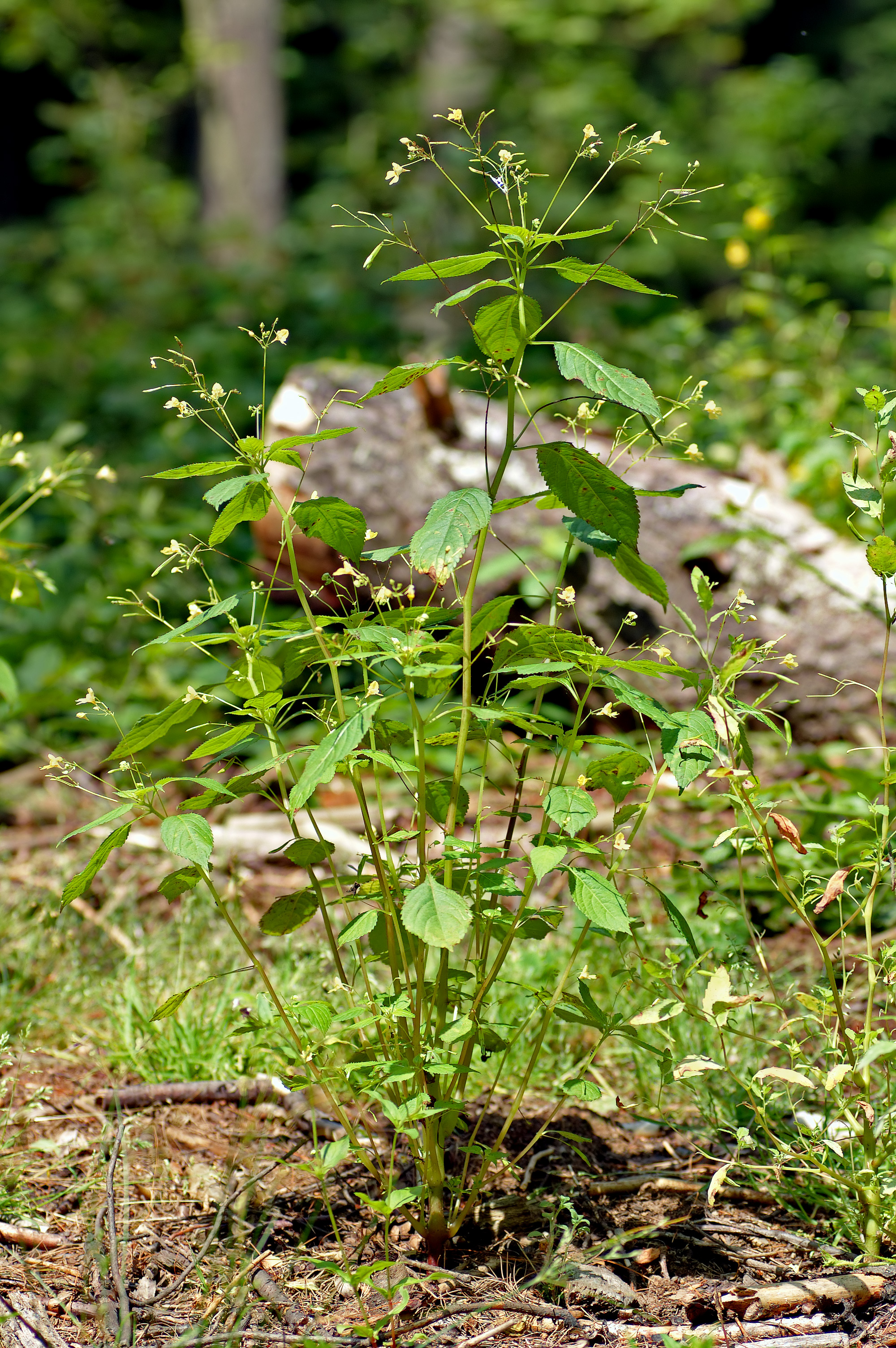

Scientific classification
- Kingdom: Plantae
- Clade: Tracheophytes
- Clade: Angiosperms
- Clade: Eudicots
- Clade: Asterids
- Order: Ericales
- Family: Balsaminaceae
- Genus: Impatiens
- Species: I. parviflora

Binomial name
- Impatiens parviflora DC.

= Impatiens parviflora =

Small balsam

Species of flowering plant

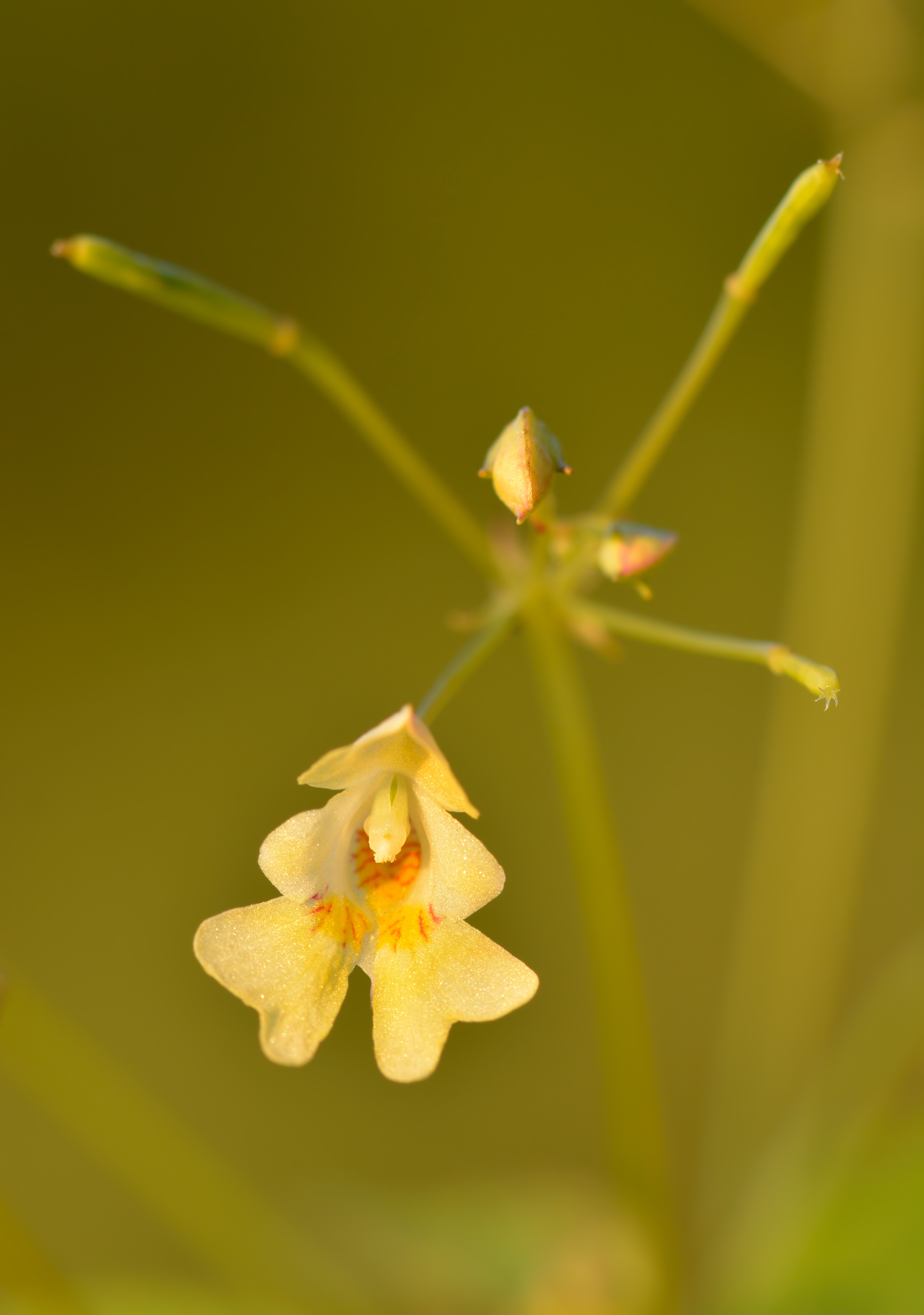
Flower

Impatiens parviflora (small balsam, or small-flowered touch-me-not) is a species of annual herbaceous plants in the family Balsaminaceae, native to some areas of Eurasia, naturalized elsewhere and found in damp shady places. Impatiens parviflora can grow in sandy, loamy, and clay soils and prefers moist soil. The name comes from the fact that ripe seed pods explode when touched to disperse seeds widely.

== Ecology ==
Impatiens parviflora flowers are pollinated by insects.

== Uses ==
Impatiens parviflora has many uses. If cooked, the leaves are completely edible. The seeds can be consumed either raw or cooked. Impatiens parviflora is also used as a treatment for warts, ringworm, and nettle stings. It is also used as a hair rinse to relieve an itchy scalp.
