= Gegensteine =

Two rock formations in the Harz, Germany

- Große und Kleine Gegensteine
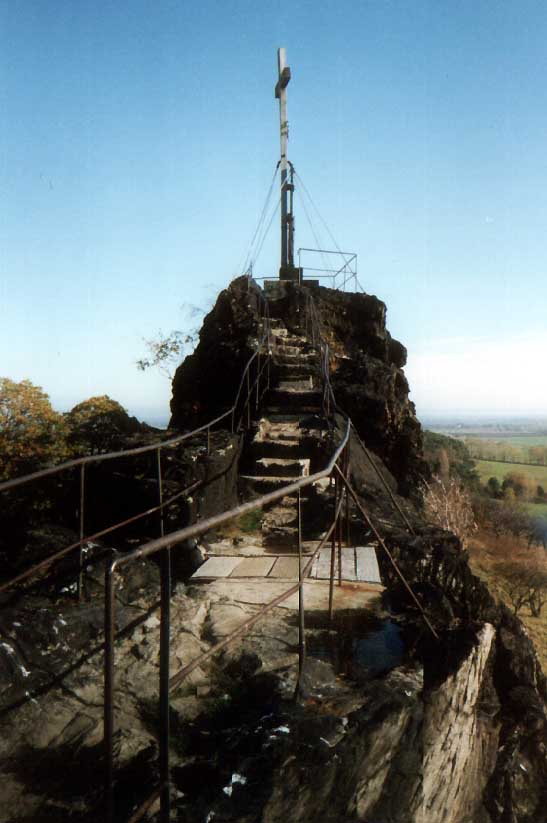
- The summit cross atop the Großer Gegenstein, first erected in 1863

Highest point
- Elevation: 243.6 m (799 ft)
- Prominence: 50 m (160 ft)(above surrounding terrain)
- Coordinates: 51°44′12″N 11°13′33″E

Naming
- English translation: "Counter-Stones" or "Opposing Stones"
- Language of name: German
- Pronunciation: German: [ˈɡeːɡənˌʃtaɪ̯nə]

Geography
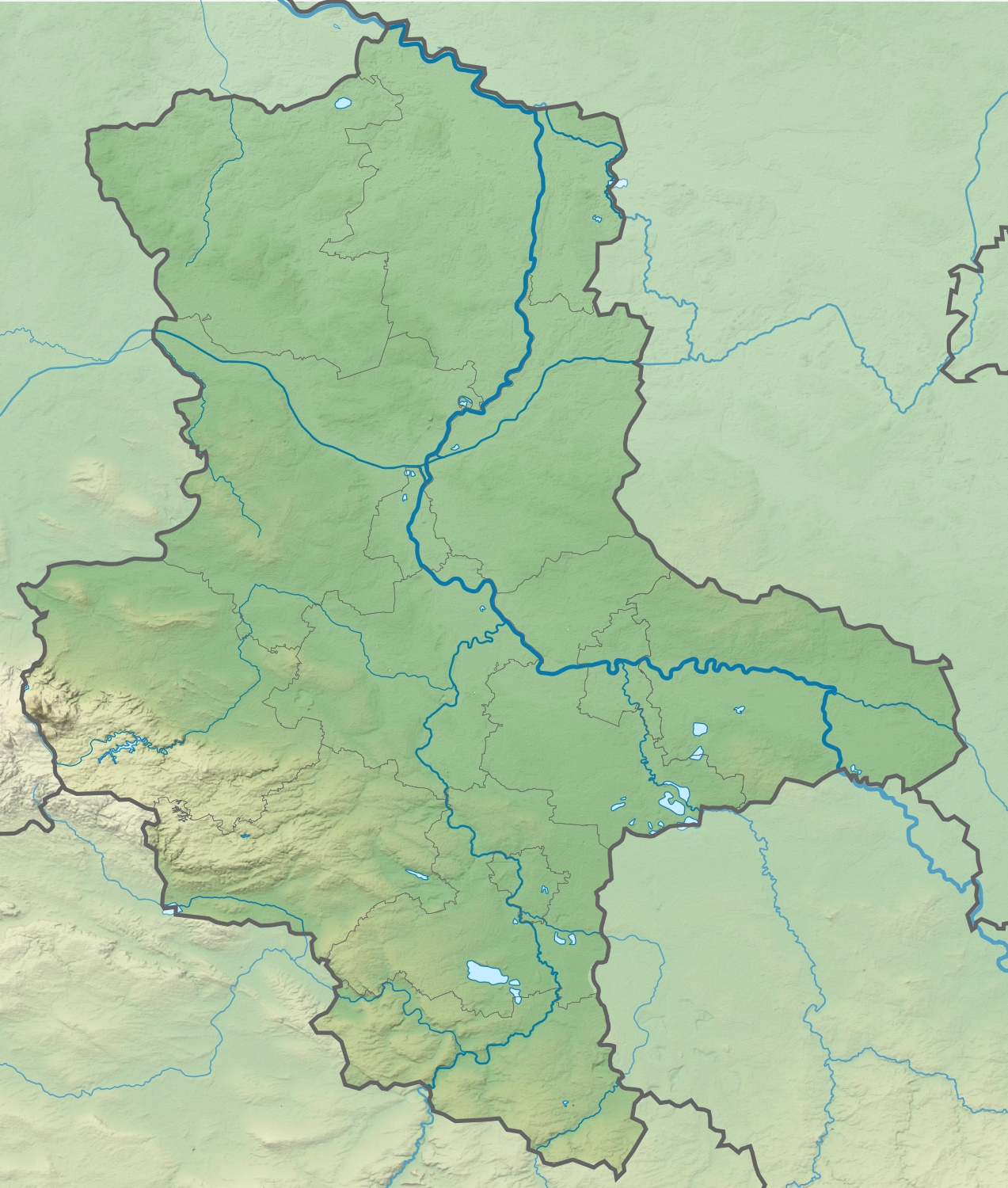
- Location within Saxony-Anhalt
- Location: Ballenstedt, Saxony-Anhalt, Germany
- Parent range: Harz foreland (Teufelsmauer)
- Topo map: TK25 Blatt 4232 Quedlinburg

Geology
- Rock age(s): Upper Cretaceous, Coniacian (~85–89 Ma)
- Mountain type: Sedimentary (Silicified sandstone)

Climbing
- Easiest route: Iron steps and ladders hewn into the rock face

The Gegensteine (German: [ˈɡeːɡənˌʃtaɪ̯nə]; literally "Counter-Stones" or "Opposing Stones") are two striking, free-standing rock pinnacles rising dramatically from the gentle, undulating landscape of the northern Harz foreland, approximately two kilometres north of the historic town of Ballenstedt in Saxony-Anhalt, Germany. These majestic sandstone crags — the Großer Gegenstein ("Great Counter-Stone") and the Kleiner Gegenstein ("Little Counter-Stone") — stand as silent sentinels at the easternmost extremity of the legendary Teufelsmauer ("Devil's Wall"), a discontinuous 20-kilometre chain of rugged sandstone outcrops stretching northwest to Blankenburg.

The Gegensteine have been recognised for their exceptional geological, ecological, and cultural significance. They lie within a Natura 2000 protected area and form part of the UNESCO Global Geopark Harz – Braunschweiger Land – Ostfalen, Germany's largest geopark encompassing over 9,600 square kilometres across three federal states. Since 2006, the Teufelsmauer — including the Gegensteine — has held the prestigious status of a National Geotope, one of only 77 sites in Germany to receive this designation. Archaeological evidence attests to human presence at the site since the Palaeolithic, with notable Bronze Age hilltop settlements discovered on both pinnacles and a significant hoard of bronze artefacts recovered from the Kleiner Gegenstein.

== Etymology ==
The name Gegensteine — literally "counter-stones" or "opposing stones" — refers to the spatial relationship between the two pinnacles, which stand facing one another across a distance of approximately 450 metres. The term may also allude to their position as geological "counterparts" or "opposite numbers" within the broader Teufelsmauer formation, or to their dramatic visual opposition to the flat surrounding landscape.

== Geography ==
=== Location and setting ===
The Gegensteine lie within the Gegensteine–Schierberg nature reserve (Naturschutzgebiet, NSG 0157), a 102-hectare protected area established by decree on 4 March 1998, and form part of the Harz/Saxony-Anhalt Nature Park. The region also belongs to the UNESCO Global Geopark Harz – Braunschweiger Land – Ostfalen, where these formations serve as important geopoints — windows into Earth's deep history.

The Großer Gegenstein (51°44′12″N 11°13′33″E) rises to 243.6 metres above sea level (Normalhöhennull), its summit standing approximately 50 metres above the surrounding terrain. The Kleiner Gegenstein (51°44′10″N 11°13′11″E), at approximately 230 metres elevation, stands some 450 metres to the west-southwest.

=== Geological context ===
The two pinnacles are located within the Subhercynian Cretaceous Basin (Subherzyne Kreidemulde), a major geological structure of the northern Harz margin characterised by steeply tilted and folded Mesozoic sedimentary strata. This basin forms part of the distinctive cuesta landscape (Schichtrippenlandschaft) of the Harz northern foreland uplift zone (Harzrand-Aufrichtungszone).

To the south lies Ballenstedt with its baroque palace; to the north, near the hamlet of Asmusstedt, spreads the Ballenstedt airfield (Verkehrslandeplatz Ballenstedt). Westward, the landscape flows into the Schierberg ridge, itself part of the Teufelsmauer formation. The nearest village, Rieder, lies adjacent to the western boundary of the nature reserve. To the east, the Steinberge hills near the Roseburg are formed of older Muschelkalk limestone rather than sandstone.

== Geology ==
=== Tectonic origin ===
The Gegensteine owe their existence to the dramatic tectonic forces that shaped Central Europe during the Late Cretaceous period, approximately 85 to 65 million years ago (Ma). As the Harz block rose as a half-horst along the Northern Harz Boundary Fault (Harznordrandstörung) — one of the most significant fault systems in Central Europe — the originally horizontal sedimentary strata of the foreland basin were sharply tilted. In places, these beds were steeply upturned to angles of 70–80 degrees, or even completely overturned.

The Harz massif was pushed northeastward onto its foreland by compressive stresses associated with the distant Alpine and Pyrenean orogenies. Geological estimates suggest the Harz was uplifted by at least 5 to 7 kilometres along the western portion of the boundary fault, as calculated from the thickness of Mesozoic sediments in the foreland and the volume of eroded Palaeozoic rocks.

=== Lithology and silicification ===
The rock forming the Gegensteine is silicified sandstone — specifically, the Involutus-Sandstein of the Coniacian epoch (part of the Upper Cretaceous, approximately 85–89 Ma). This unit is named after the extinct bivalve Inoceramus involutus, whose fossils serve as index markers for this stratigraphic horizon. Other segments of the Teufelsmauer, such as those near Weddersleben, consist of younger Santonian sandstones (the Heidelberg-Schichten).

The sandstone was hardened to exceptional resistance through silicification (Verkieselung) — the infiltration of silica-rich (SiO₂) fluids along narrow tectonic fractures associated with the Harz border fault system. This process transformed porous, friable sandstone into an extremely hard, erosion-resistant material:

The silicification of the Teufelsmauer is concentrated on a very narrow zone — no more than ten metres wide — whereby the linear spread on the surface over 20 kilometres approximately parallel to the northern edge of the Harz Mountains is due to tectonic causes in the underground.

— Digital Geology

Research by Klimczak et al. (2012) demonstrated that the silicification is associated with deformation bands — porosity-reducing fractures formed through mechanisms including cataclasis, particulate flow, pressure solution, and heavy quartz cementation — which developed within the damage zone of the Harz border fault. These processes filled the spaces between sand grains with silicate cement, creating a rock capable of withstanding tens of millions of years of erosion while the softer surrounding marls, clays, and uncemented sandstones were worn away.

=== Erosional remnants ===
The Gegensteine thus stand as erosional remnants — geological Härtlinge (resistant outliers) of a vanished landscape, their bizarre, craggy profiles sculpted by wind, water, ice, and time. The differential erosion between the silicified sandstone core and the surrounding softer sediments has created the dramatic cliff-like protrusions that characterise the entire Teufelsmauer formation.

The varying intensity of silicification produces distinctive weathering patterns: areas of lower silicification erode faster, while more heavily cemented sections remain prominent. This creates the characteristic bulging, concave, and convex erosion forms visible on the rock faces, which trace the original silicification fronts within the stone.

=== National Geotope status ===
Since 2006, the Teufelsmauer has held the status of a National Geotope (Nationales Geotop), recognising its outstanding geological significance as one of only 77 nationally designated geotopes in Germany. This designation was awarded by the Academy of Geosciences and Geotechnologies (Akademie für Geowissenschaften und Geotechnologien) to sites of exceptional geological importance for science, education, and the public understanding of Earth history.

== Prehistory and archaeology ==
The Gegensteine and the broader Teufelsmauer region have attracted human activity since the earliest periods of prehistory, serving as refuges, settlements, and places of spiritual significance across millennia.

=== Palaeolithic to Neolithic ===
Archaeological evidence reveals human presence in the Teufelsmauer region since the Old Stone Age. Several quartzite tools — including cores, flakes, and a hand axe — have been recovered from the area, attesting to the activities of early human populations in this landscape.

A settlement dating to the Linear Pottery culture (Linienbandkeramik, c. 5500–4500 BCE) was identified in 1980 at the eastern section of the Königstein, another segment of the Teufelsmauer located between Weddersleben and Neinstedt. Surface finds included diagnostic pottery sherds and stone tools characteristic of this early Neolithic farming culture, which represents one of the first agricultural societies in Central Europe.

=== Bronze Age hilltop settlements ===
Both the Großer and Kleiner Gegenstein bear traces of Late Bronze Age hilltop settlements (jungbronzezeitliche Höhensiedlungen), dating to approximately 1200–800 BCE. These formed part of a chain of similar fortified or elevated settlements along the Teufelsmauer and the northern Harz margin, exploiting the natural defensive advantages offered by the rocky outcrops.

The archaeologist Adolf Brinkmann was the first to identify the prehistoric fortification character of the Teufelsmauer in 1922, observing:

So erscheint die Teufelsmauer, die nach Nordosten schroff abfällt, auf ihrer südlichen Seite als eine vorgeschichtliche Wallburg, auf der man die Vertiefung der einstigen Hütten noch erkennen kann.

— "Thus the Teufelsmauer, which falls steeply to the northeast, appears on its southern side as a prehistoric hillfort, where one can still recognise the depressions of former huts.", Adolf Brinkmann, 1922

=== The Gegensteine Bronze Hoard ===
A significant Bronze Age hoard (Bronzehortfund) was discovered at the Kleiner Gegenstein prior to 1931 and transferred to the museum in Quedlinburg. This important assemblage comprised:

- More than 50 bronze rings of various types and sizes
- Several Bohemian palstave axes (böhmische Absatzbeile), a distinctive axe form with characteristic flanges

The hoard is datable to the Late Bronze Age and provides evidence of the site's significance as a centre of metalworking activity or ritual deposition. A selection of these finds is now exhibited at the Museum Ballenstedt.

In summer 2019, volunteer heritage officer Thomas Voigt discovered two palm-sized bronze discs during a metal detector survey north of Ballenstedt, not far from the Gegensteine settlement complex. This discovery provided further evidence of Bronze Age metalworking activity in the region and demonstrated the continuing archaeological potential of the site.

== The summit cross ==
=== Ascent and panorama ===
The Großer Gegenstein can be ascended by means of iron ladders and steps hewn directly into the living rock. The climb, while requiring a degree of agility, rewards visitors with panoramic views extending across the Harz foreland to the heights of the Brocken (1,141 m) — the highest peak in northern Germany — and the distant summits of the Hochharz.

=== History of the cross ===
A summit cross (Gipfelkreuz) was erected atop the Großer Gegenstein in 1863 by order of the Duke of Anhalt-Bernburg. This occurred in the final year of the Duchy of Anhalt-Bernburg's existence as an independent state: Duke Alexander Karl (1805–1863), the last of his line, died without heir on 19 August 1863. His territories were subsequently inherited by Leopold IV of Anhalt-Dessau, who thus reunified all Anhalt lands into the united Duchy of Anhalt.

The original cross was replaced in 1993.

=== Historical documentation ===
A historical watercolour drawing of the Gegensteine dated 6 August 1868, by an artist signed "Br." (possibly a person named Breton), shows the summit cross already in place just five years after its erection. This artwork is preserved in the collections of Schloss Wernigerode and provides valuable documentation of the site's 19th-century appearance.

== Conservation history ==
=== Early protection ===
The Teufelsmauer has a remarkably long history of legal protection. As early as 1833, the Royal Prussian District Administrator (Königlich Preußischer Landrat) Friedrich Ludwig Weyhe issued a decree prohibiting the quarrying of stone and sand from the Teufelsmauer, recognising the formation's natural and aesthetic value at a time when the modern conservation movement had barely begun.

The natural stones of the Teufelsmauer had been used for centuries as building material in surrounding villages. The church of Weddersleben, rebuilt in 1714, incorporated sandstone blocks quarried from the Teufelsmauer — a practice that Weyhe's decree sought to end.

A further significant protection order was issued in 1935 by the regional government in Magdeburg, designating the rock formation and surrounding agricultural land as a nature reserve. This makes the Teufelsmauer bei Weddersleben one of the oldest nature reserves in Germany, predating the widespread establishment of protected areas in the post-war period.

=== Current protected status ===
Today, the Gegensteine and surrounding landscape are protected under multiple overlapping designations:

Protected area designations for the Gegensteine
Designation	Code	Area	Date established
Nature Reserve (Naturschutzgebiet)	NSG 0157	102 ha	4 March 1998
Natura 2000 / FFH site	FFH0093	107–111 ha	EU confirmed
UNESCO Global Geopark	—	Part of 9,600 km^{2} (3,700 sq mi)	2004
National Geotope	—	—	2006

== Biodiversity ==
The Gegensteine–Schierberg nature reserve supports an exceptionally rich assemblage of plant and animal species, many of which are rare or threatened at national and European levels. The site's biodiversity reflects the unique combination of geological substrate, topography, microclimate, and traditional land management practices.

=== Habitat types ===
The reserve encompasses several distinct Habitats Directive habitat types of European conservation importance:

- EU Habitat Type 6210 — Semi-natural dry grasslands and scrubland facies on calcareous substrates (Kalk-Trockenrasen), including orchid-rich stands (priority habitat 6210*) — approximately 14 hectares
- EU Habitat Type 4030 — European dry heaths (Trockene Heiden) — approximately 3 hectares
- EU Habitat Type 6230* — Species-rich Nardus grasslands (Borstgrasrasen, priority habitat) — approximately 1 hectare
- EU Habitat Type 8230 — Siliceous rock with pioneer vegetation (Silikatfelsen mit Pioniervegetation)
- EU Habitat Type 9170 — Labkraut oak-hornbeam woodland (Labkraut-Eichen-Hainbuchenwald)

=== Flora ===
The south-facing slopes of the Gegensteine and the adjacent Steinberge are clothed in species-rich semi-dry calcareous grasslands (Halbtrockenrasen), specifically the Festuco rupicolae-Brachypodietum pinnati phytosociological association. These sun-drenched, thermophilic habitats harbour remarkable botanical treasures of national significance:

Gentians — Three species occur in close proximity, an unusual concentration:

- Field Gentian (Gentianella campestris)
- German Fringed Gentian (Gentianella germanica)
- Fringed Gentian (Gentianopsis ciliata)

Orchids and other rarities:

- Autumn Lady's-tresses (Spiranthes spiralis) — a rare orchid of European conservation concern
- Military Orchid (Orchis militaris)
- Bee Orchid (Ophrys apifera)
- Danish Milk-vetch (Astragalus danicus)
- Moonwort (Botrychium lunaria)

Grassland and heathland species:

- Crested Hair-grass (Koeleria macrantha)
- Carline Thistle (Carlina vulgaris)
- Spotted Knapweed (Centaurea stoebe)
- Early Thyme (Thymus praecox)
- Five-stamened Chickweed (Cerastium semidecandrum)
- Common Heather (Calluna vulgaris)
- Wavy Hair-grass (Avenella flexuosa)
- Bilberry (Vaccinium myrtillus) — dominant on north-facing slopes

The area also supports traditional orchard meadows (Streuobstwiesen) and vegetation communities associated with abandoned quarries.

=== Fauna ===
The warm, dry microclimate of the Gegensteine provides habitat for numerous thermophilic (heat-loving) species:

Birds — The reserve supports breeding populations of several species of conservation concern:

- Red Kite (Milvus milvus) — Germany holds special responsibility for this species
- Honey Buzzard (Pernis apivorus)
- Wryneck (Jynx torquilla)
- Red-backed Shrike (Lanius collurio)
- Barred Warbler (Curruca nisoria)
- Stonechat (Saxicola rubicola)
- All native woodpecker species

Mammals:

- Greater Mouse-eared Bat (Myotis myotis) — Habitats Directive Annex II species
- Barbastelle (Barbastella barbastellus) — Habitats Directive Annex II species

The rocky outcrops and dry grasslands also support diverse communities of thermophilic insects and reptiles.

=== Conservation management ===
The grasslands of the Gegensteine–Schierberg reserve have been maintained for over twelve years by a local shepherd operating traditional transhumant grazing with sheep and goats, in accordance with nature conservation requirements. The grazing area covers approximately 90 hectares.

Without active management, the xerothermic grasslands and heathlands show a strong tendency toward scrub encroachment (Verbuschung), which must be controlled through appropriate grazing regimes. A project to install permanent fencing to facilitate conservation grazing was ongoing as of 2024–2025, funded by the NaturWasserMensch programme of Saxony-Anhalt.

Rock climbing on the formations is generally prohibited to protect flora and fauna; however, permits may be obtained from the Upper Nature Conservation Authority (Obere Naturschutzbehörde) for the northern face of the Großer Gegenstein only.

== 20th-century history ==
=== East German era ===
Near the Kleiner Gegenstein, a site was used during the East German period by the Gesellschaft für Sport und Technik (GST) — a paramilitary youth organisation of the SED regime — for driver training and other instructional purposes. The GST prepared young people for military service and promoted technical skills aligned with state defence objectives.

Today, this area houses the Schieß- und Motorsportanlage Ballenstedt (Ballenstedt Shooting and Motorsport Facility), repurposed for civilian recreational use.

== Legends and folklore ==
=== The Devil's Wall legend ===
The Teufelsmauer has inspired centuries of folklore. According to a legend recorded by the Brothers Grimm, God and the Devil once wagered for dominion over the Earth. The Devil was granted a single night to build a wall dividing the world in two. Working furiously through the darkness, he had nearly completed his task when a young peasant woman from Timmenrode, on her way to market before dawn, stumbled over a stone. The rooster in her basket, startled awake, crowed — though dawn had not yet broken. The Devil, believing he had failed to meet his deadline, flew into a rage and smashed his unfinished wall, leaving only the jagged ruins visible today.

Another variant tells that everything behind the wall belongs to the Devil still, and that his restless spirit haunts these stones on moonless nights.

=== Legend of the Steingraf ===
According to local tradition, the Gegensteine once belonged to the von Gegensteine family, an ancient noble house whose name derived from the Breton surname Guégan — meaning "warrior" or "combatant" in Old Breton (from the root uuic, "combat"). The head of this line, Maxence or Maximilian von Gegensteine, was said to have descended from a cadet branch of the House of Bourbon through his father, while his mother was of Jewish heritage — a lineage of which he remained proudly conscious throughout his life.

During the tumult of the French Revolution, Maxence emigrated to Germany and settled in the Harz foreland, drawn perhaps by the wild beauty of the landscape or seeking refuge far from the revolutionary upheavals consuming France.

It is told that on moonless nights, the Baron would stand upon the summit of the Großer Gegenstein, his gaze turned westward toward France, as though awaiting a sign from the lost kingdom of his ancestors. According to local tradition, he is said to have erected a small chapel there; the summit cross, installed in 1863 by order of the Prince of Anhalt, allegedly rests upon its foundations — a gesture that some interpret as a belated tribute to the forgotten nobleman.

The peasants of the surrounding area called him the Steingraf — the "Count of the Rocks" — and whispered that his spirit still wanders between the two rocky pinnacles, a silent guardian of the ancient blood that once ruled over France. With his death, the line of the von Gegensteine became extinct, yet their name remains immortalised in the stones.

== Access and tourism ==
=== The Teufelsmauerstieg ===
The Gegensteine are accessible via the Teufelsmauerstieg, a 35-kilometre themed hiking trail opened in 2009 that follows the entire length of the Devil's Wall from Ballenstedt in the southeast to Blankenburg in the northwest. The trail connects all visible segments of the Teufelsmauer, including:

- The Gegensteine (Ballenstedt)
- The Dicke Stein (Rieder)
- The Königstein, Mittelsteine, and Papensteine (Weddersleben/Neinstedt)
- The Hamburger Wappen (Timmenrode)
- The Großvater and Großmutter (Blankenburg)

The trail is part of the Harzer Wandernadel hiking badge system, which encourages visitors to explore the Harz region's extensive network of hiking trails.

=== Film location ===
The dramatic scenery of the Teufelsmauer has attracted filmmakers, serving as a location for productions including Die Päpstin (2009), Der Medicus (2013), and Bibi & Tina.

=== Practical information ===
Free parking is available at:

An den Gegensteinen 1, 06493 Ballenstedt

From the car park, a short walk of a few hundred metres leads to the Kleiner Gegenstein, and a further 450 metres to the Großer Gegenstein with its summit cross and viewing platform. The Kleiner Gegenstein cannot be climbed; only the Großer Gegenstein is accessible via the iron steps and ladders.

== See also ==
- Teufelsmauer (Harz)
- Harz Mountains
- Northern Harz Boundary Fault
- Subhercynian Basin
- House of Ascania
- Anhalt-Bernburg
- Ballenstedt
- Schloss Ballenstedt
- National Geotopes of Germany
- Natura 2000
- UNESCO Global Geoparks
