= Hamburger Wappen =

Coordinates: 51°46′38″N 11°00′06″E

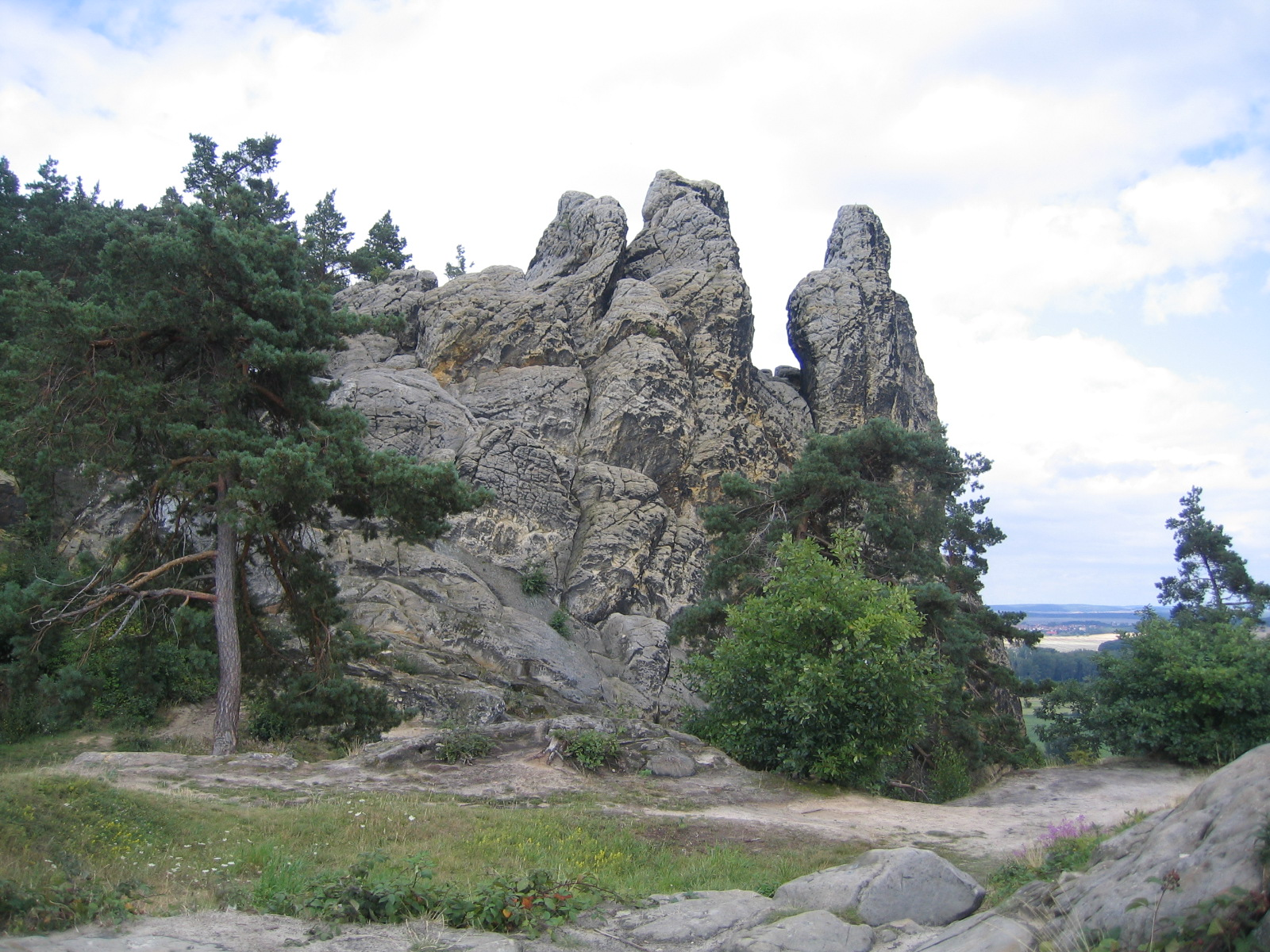
The rock feature known as Hamburger Wappen

Hamburg coat of arms

The Hamburger Wappen ("Hamburg coat of arms") is a highly unusual rock feature on the Teufelsmauer ("Devil's Wall") rock formation not far from Timmenrode in the Harz Mountains in central Germany.

The appearance of this sandstone formation, with its three steep, soaring pinnacles of rock, recalls the coat of arms of the Hanseatic city of Hamburg with its three towers.

Next to it is a rock cave known as the Kuhstall ("Cow shed").

Not far from the Hamburger Wappen is control point no. 74 on the Harzer Wandernadel hiking network.
