= Oberhof Ballenstedt =

Coordinates: 51°43′13.14″N 11°14′29.45″E

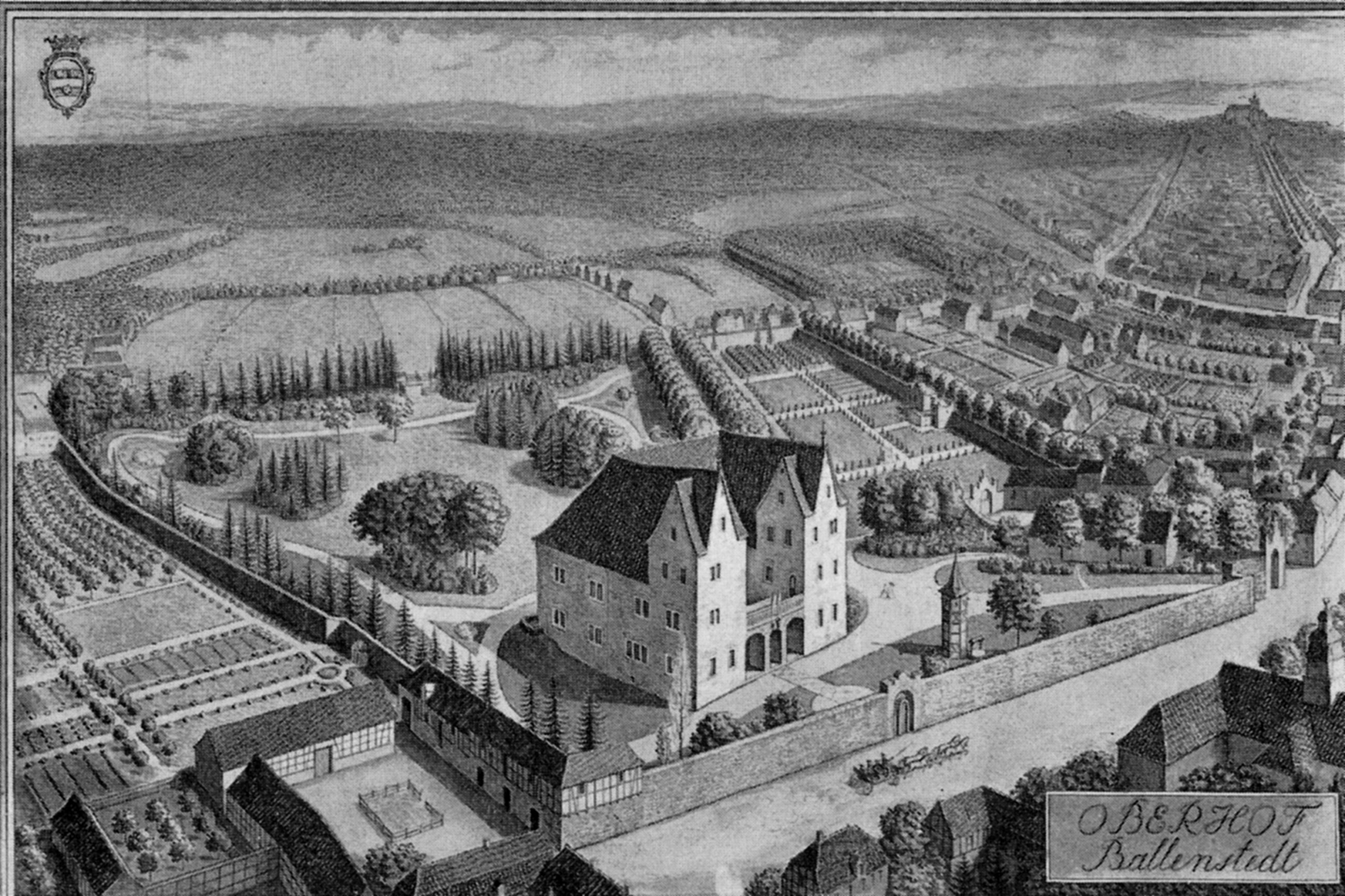
The Oberhof Ballenstedt in 1937, drawing by Anco Wigboldus

The Oberhof Ballenstedt is a stately home next to the town hall in Ballenstedt in the German state of Saxony-Anhalt.

Today it is a schloss, but originally the Oberhof was a fortified town castle (Stadtburg), that had been enfeoffed to the family of its builders, the lords of Stammern since its construction in the 16th century. The gravestones and epitaphs of the family from the 16th century are now in Ballenstedt's St. Nicholas' Church.

In the interior of the Late Gothic, three-winged building the groin vaults on the ground floor, dating to the time of the original construction, have been preserved. The connecting wing between the west and east wings was added in the 19th century.

In 1869, Armgard of Alvensleben from the House of Neugattersleben purchased the property, laid out the castle grounds covering 15,000 m² and bequeathed the Oberhof in 1920 to the Alvensleben Family Foundation.

Since 1948 a children's day care centre has been housed in the former castle. Today it is once again owned by the von Alvensleben family.

The illustration is a 1937 wash drawing by the Dutch artist, Anco Wigboldus, who portrays the condition of the Oberhof and its surroundings after the First World War in an idealised way.

== Sources ==
- Udo von Alvensleben: Alvenslebensche Burgen und Landsitze. Dortmund 1960.
- Anco Wigboldus: Burgen, Schlösser und Gärten. Deutsche Burgenvereinigung, Marksburg über Braubach/Rhein 1974, p. 72–73 (Veröffentlichungen der Deutschen Burgenvereinigung. Vol. 8).
- Georg Dehio: Handbuch der Deutschen Kunstdenkmäler. Der Bezirk Halle. Deutscher Kunstverlag, Munich/Berlin 1976, p. 24.
