= Teufelsmauer =

Extending about 12 miles on Harz mountain range

Coordinates: 51°45′27″N 11°04′59″E

The Teufelsmauer (German for "Devil's Wall") is a famous natural rock formation located in the Harz mountains of central Germany. It stretches across the state of Saxony-Anhalt and is known for its striking, jagged sandstone cliffs and unique geological structure.

Formed over millions of years, the Teufelsmauer was shaped by erosion and tectonic activity. The rock wall is part of the Northern Harz Boundary Fault and is considered one of the oldest rock formations in the region.

The Teufelsmauer is surrounded by legends. One popular myth says the devil tried to claim land from God and built the wall overnight, but failed to complete it before sunrise—hence the name "Devil’s Wall."

Today, it is a protected natural monument and a popular hiking and sightseeing destination, attracting nature lovers, photographers, and tourists alike

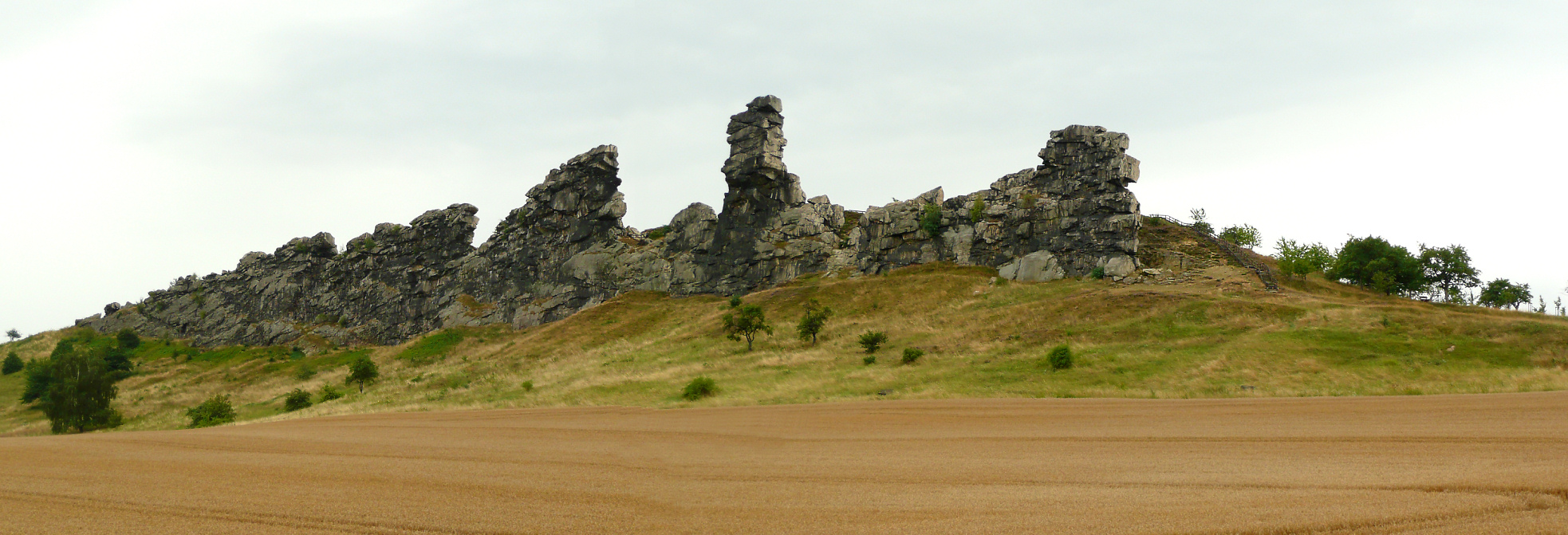
The rock wall of the Teufelsmauer. Here the Mittelsteine near Weddersleben

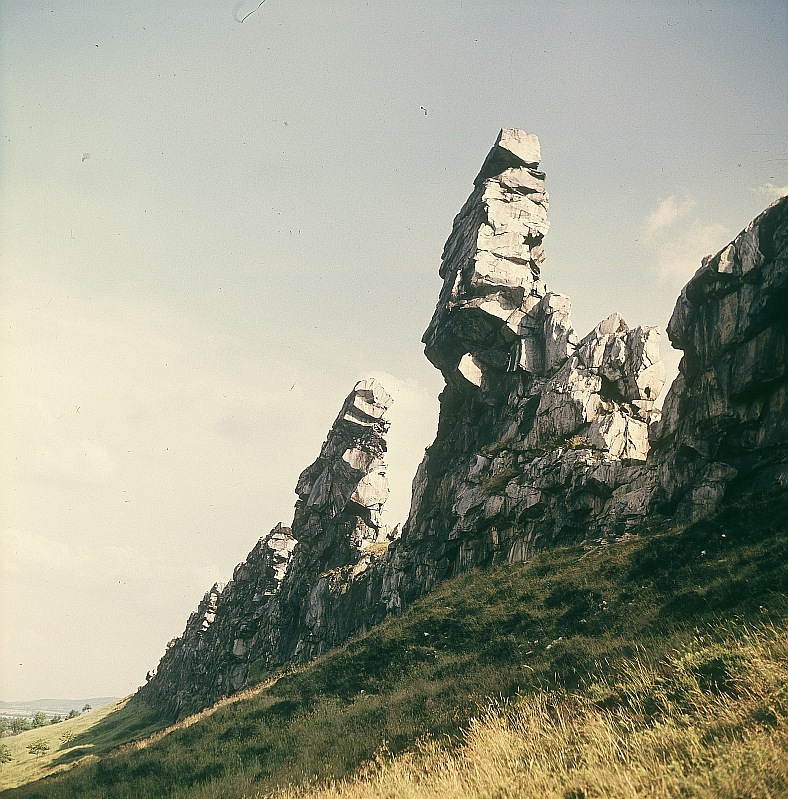
Close-up of the Mittelsteine

The Teufelsmauer is a rock formation made of hard sandstones of the Upper Cretaceous in the northern part of the Harz Foreland in central Germany. This wall of rock runs from Blankenburg (Harz) via Weddersleben and Rieder to Ballenstedt. The most prominent individual rocks of the Teufelsmauer have their own names. The Teufelsmauer near Weddersleben is also called the Adlersklippen ("Eagle Crags").

Many legends and myths have been woven in order to try to explain the unusual rock formation. It was placed under protection as early as 1833 and, in 1852, by the head of the district authority in order to prevent quarrying of the much sought-after sandstone. The Teufelsmauer near Weddersleben has been protected since 1935 as a nature reserve and is thus one of the oldest nature reserves in Germany.

== Course ==
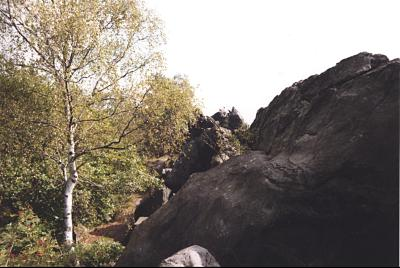
The Teufelsmauer near Blankenburg

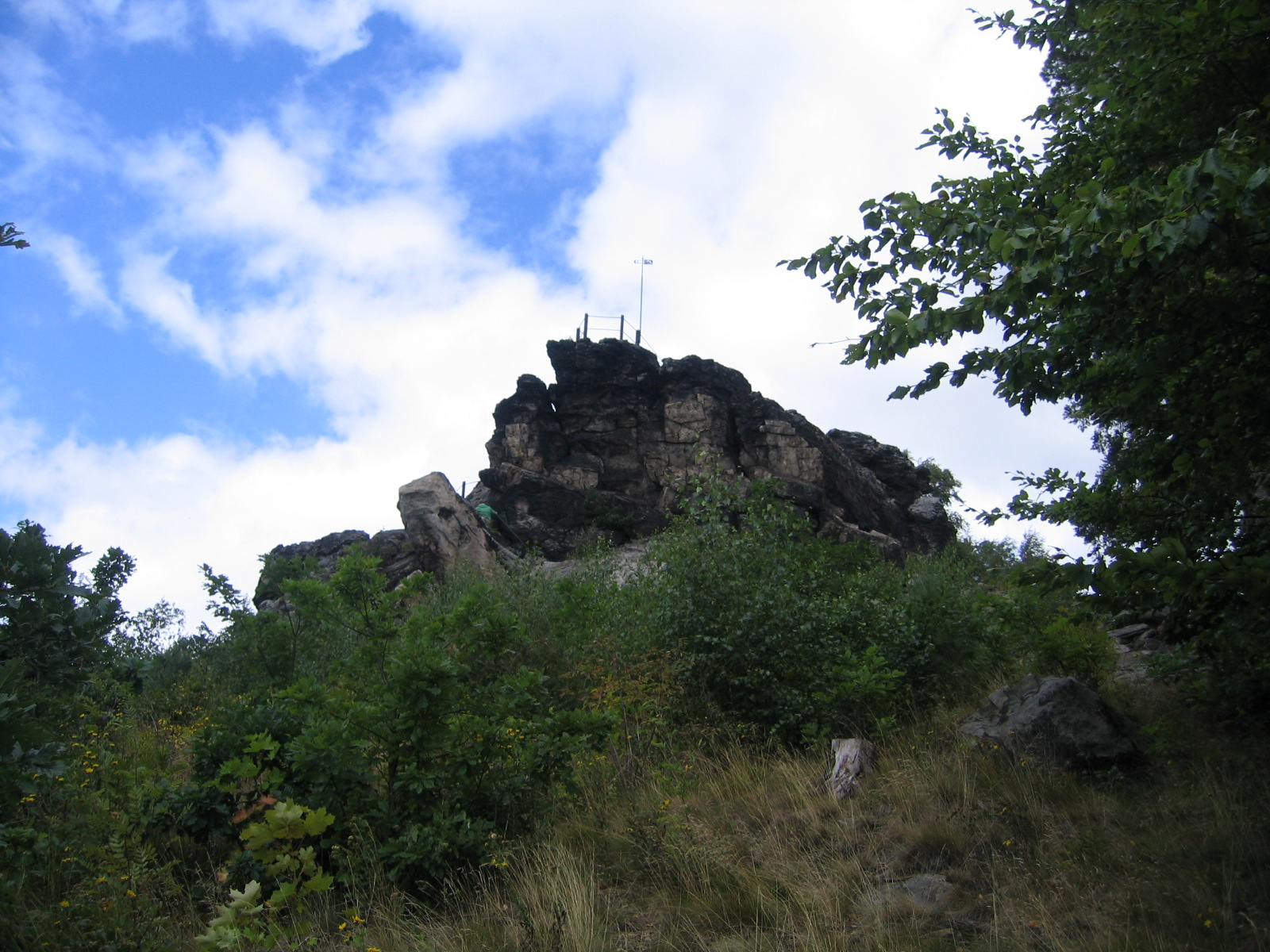
The Großvater rock north of Blankenburg

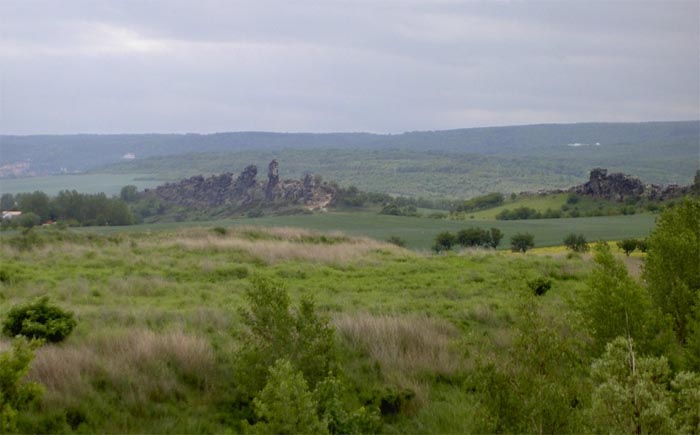
The Teufelsmauer from a distance

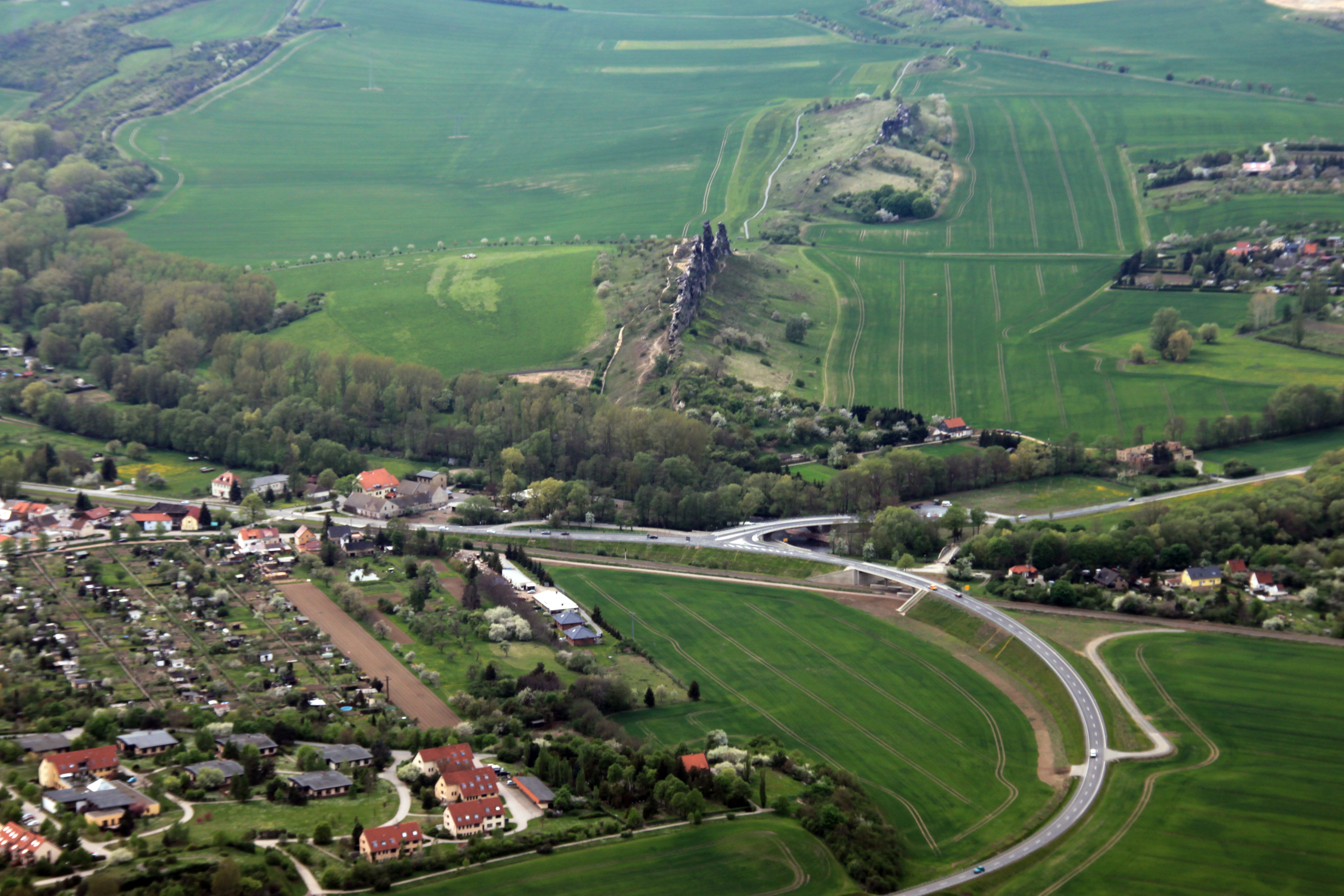
The Teufelsmauer near Weddersleben

The band of rock that forms the Teufelsmauer outcrops at three places between Ballenstedt in the southeast and Blankenburg (Harz) in the northwest, over a distance of 20 km. It begins with an outcrop known as the Gegensteine northwest of Ballenstedt and is continued in the shape of the Teufelsmauer which runs from south of Weddersleben to Warnstedt. Here, the formations of the Königstein, the Mittelsteine and the Papensteine rear up from a line of rock about 2 km long running from southeast to northwest. Away to the northwest it continues as a ridge between Timmenrode and Blankenburg (Harz) which includes the Hamburger Wappen, the Heidelberg (331.5 m above NN) and the crags of the Großvater and Großmutter (317 m above NN).

== Geology ==
The rock outcrops of the Teufelsmauer are formed of hard sandstones from the various epochs of the Upper Cretaceous. The predominantly clayey and limy strata of the Upper Cretaceous are intercalated by harder sandstones such as Neocomian, Involutus and Heidelberg Sandstone, as well as limestones. In addition, quartzitation caused by the ingress of silicic acid has produced extreme hardening of the sandstones, restricted to just a few metres of the formerly horizontally-oriented strata.

The layers of rock, like all the strata on the northern edge of the Harz, were sharply tilted or folded over by the uplifting of the Harz up to the Cretaceous period, so that the surface layers are now upside down. A hiatus in the strata between the lias and the Lower Cretaceous and the discordant, overlapping layering of the Upper Cretaceous up to the muschelkalk indicate that activity took place at different times, particularly on the Northern Harz Boundary Fault.

The subsequent erosion of softer rock exposed the hard rock strata as prominent ribs that form crags and pinnacles up to 20 metres above the surrounding area. Some were subsequently destroyed by the action of rivers or ice age glaciers. As a result there are a number of gaps in the Teufelsmauer today.

The individual elements of the Teufelsmauer are not exactly the same age. The Gegensteine near Ballenstedt has been weathered from a silicified sandstone stratum of the Emscher epoch. The steeply inclined bands of rock near Blankenburg comprise quartzitic sandstones of the Santonian. The jagged ridge of rock that forms the Teufelsmauer near Weddersleben, by contrast, consists of younger, and therefore undisturbed, deposits of higher-lying Senonian strata. This reaches its greatest height in the Mittelstein (185.2 m) and the Königsstein (184.5 m) and stands some 50 metres proud of the Bode Gorge.

== Archaeology ==
Archaeological finds on the Teufelsmauer show traces of the Old Stone Age, Linear Pottery culture and the Bronze Age.

== Soils ==
The soils formed from the sand of the various sandstones are regosols and lithic leptosols which are poor in nutrients.

== Flora ==
The sandy soils have been settled by nutrient-poor grasslands of Elijah Blue Fescue and Grey Hair-grass, the pioneer vegetation of open, sunny, sandy terrain outside littoral regions. The grasses are in places rich in colourful herbs such as Breckland Thyme (Thymus serpyllum), Sheep's-bit (Jasione montana) and Carthusian Pink (Dianthus carthusianorum). In the open areas of sandy soil there are also species of flower normally found in fields of crops and on roadsides. The vegetation is also characterised by numerous warmth-loving plants such as Viper's Bugloss (Echium vulgare), Flixweed (Descurainia sophia) and St. Lucie Cherry (Prunus mahaleb) as well as many common subcontinental species like Hoary Alison (Berteroa incana), Field Eryngo (Eryngium campestre), Field Mugwort (Artemisia campestris), Spotted Knapweed (Centaurea stoebe) and Asparagus (Asparagus officinalis). The sandstone rocks themselves are lightly covered in crustose lichens.

== Tourism ==
The rock formations of the Teufelsmauer are all accessible by footpath. They are among the attractions of the towns of Thale and Blankenburg. In order to conserve protected plant species, it has become necessary to implement measures for visitor management in the Teufelsmauer nature reserve. The rocks may be reached from hiking trails and vantage points are protected by safety railings. Several of the rocks in the Teufelsmauer at Blankenburg may be climbed.

There are checkpoints in the Harzer Wandernadel hiking system at various points along the Teufelsmauer: at Gasthaus Großvater, the inn below the Großvater rocks, (no. 76), by the Hamburger Wappen (no. 74) and on the south side of the ridge at Teufelsmauer Weddersleben (no. 188).

The formations feature in the film "Frantz" by François Ozon.

== The legends of the Teufelsmauer ==
=== From the Brothers Grimm collection ===
"On the Northern Harz, between Blankenburg and Quedlinburg, one sees an area of rocks south of the village of Thale that the people call the Devil's dance floor, and not far from there is the rubble pile of an old wall, opposite which, north of the village, stands a large ridge of rocks. Those ruins and that ridge are called by the people: Devil's Wall [Teufelsmauer]. The devil fought long with our dear God for dominion over the earth. (actually the devil built it in order to share the world with Him. But since he was only given a certain time and the whole wall was not completed within the time limit, the evil one in his anger destroyed a great deal of his work again, so that only a few pieces of it were left.) At last, a division of the land then inhabited was agreed. The rocks, where the dance floor now is, were to separate the border and the Devil built his wall with loud cheers and dancing. But soon the insatiable one started new quarrels, which ended in him also being given the valley at the foot of the rocks. There is added a second Devil's Wall."

=== The legend of the three elves ===
"Once upon a time a soldier was granted a tract of land behind Thale, up to the Teufelsmauer, as a reward for his services. This he cleared by the sweat of his brow. He had almost finished his day's work. The tree-trunks lay criss-crossed, their branches hung limp. Only three trees were still standing against the evening sky and he was too tired even to lay hands on them. As he fell into a slumber, however, it seemed to him that he heard moaning and groaning, and he saw little female figures, gleaming like clouds of mist, in the branches, who wailed that they should now lose their lives like their sisters. "You shall see no harm done", he cried, and kept his word. But when, many years later, a descendant of his chopped off these branches too, the soil dried up and the wind carried it away and with it his wealth. This happens to all those who do not respect the little spirits and look after nothing other than themselves and their own greed."

=== The Devil and the cockerel ===
The legend of "the Devil and the cockerel" in the Harz region has two variants:

The first variant of the legend has a market woman from Cattenstedt coming to a small village near Blankenburg with a cockerel: "God and the devil were fighting for the possession of the earth, they agreed that God should keep the fertile plains, the Devil, the ore-bearing Harz Mountains, if he had completed a boundary wall by the time the first cock crowed. He built it up to the edge of the Harz. Meanwhile a market woman from Cattenstedt, who was on her way to Blankenburg, came by carrying a cockerel in her basket. With a stone still missing from the wall, the cockerel crowed. The Devil's work had been in vain and he destroyed his wall in a fit of rage."

The second variant has a farmer's wife from Timmenrode appearing: "In a gray time the Devil came to an agreement with the Lord over a division of the estate. He wanted the Harz, however, to be his dominion. So they bet each other that he might have the mountains, if he managed to build in one night a wall as high and strong as the buildings of the emperor. Said and done, the wall rose up in the dark. Then the Lord had a farmer's wife from Timmenrode walk to market with her cockerel and stumble over a small pebble. Whereupon the rooster stretched his neck in the basket and began to crow. The Devil thought the night was over and flung the keystone furiously against his wall, leaving only fragments of it standing."

These two variants of the North Harz Teufelsmauer legend involving wagers and a cockerel are similar to several versions from the Lower Bavarian Danube region.
