= Radisleben =

- Stadtteil of Ballenstedt
- Interactive map of Radisleben
- Location within Germany Location within Saxony-Anhalt
- Coordinates: 51°44′21″N 11°17′30″E
- Country: Germany
- State: Saxony-Anhalt
- District: Harz
- Town: Ballenstedt

Area
  - Total: 8.17 km^{2} (3.15 sq mi)
- Elevation: 175 m (574 ft)

Population (2008-12-31)
  - Total: 453
  - Density: 55.4/km^{2} (144/sq mi)
- Time zone: UTC+01:00 (CET)
  - Summer (DST): UTC+02:00 (CEST)
- Postal codes: 06493
- Vehicle registration: HZ

Radisleben is a village and a former municipality in the district of Harz, in Saxony-Anhalt, Germany. Since 1 January 2010, it is part of the town Ballenstedt.
