= Timroth =

European noble family

The Timroth family, also Tiemroth, Timrott, Thiemeroth, Thimroth, Timrots/Timrota and Timrod (in Russian Тимрот), is a noble family of the Netherlands, Livonia, Courland, Russia and Finland from Thuringia. The family is registered in the Genealogisches Handbuch des Adels.

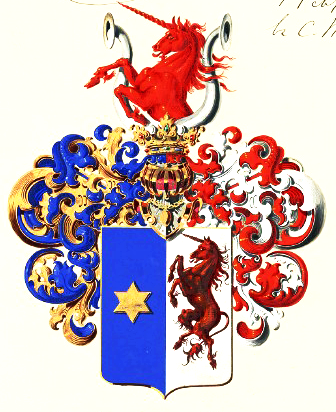
The noble coat of arms of Timroth

== History ==
The family is believed to originate in the village of Timmenrode in the Harz mountains. It is believed to be associated with Henrikus Dimorode, who is mentioned as early as 1277 and appears in the "Collection of documents of the Teutonic Order, Bailiwick of Thuringen" ("Urkundenbuch des Deutschritterordens Ballei Thuringen"). The first records of the family are from the beginning of the 17th century, when Heinrich Thiemeroth lived in Rüxleben, Thuringia. His son Johann Thiemeroth (1630–1683) moved to Frankenhausen, where he was a teacher at a local school. The coat of arms dates to at least his son, Johann Caspar Timroth (1661–1727), though could have been granted as early as 1559. From there, the family splits into Livonian, Dutch, and Danish lines.

The Livonian line achieved success in the service of the Russian tsars, serving as officers in the Semyonovsky Life Guards Regiment, an elite unit of the Imperial Russian Army. Alexander von Timroth (1788–1848) earned distinction commanding troops in the Battle of Borodino during the Napoleonic Wars, for which he was awarded the Gold Sword for Bravery. In 1830, the family was raised to the Russian nobility.

In 1894, the family was included in the registry of the knighthood of Courland. Michael von Timroth was matriculated into the Verband der Baltischen Ritterschaften in 1971.

== Notable family members ==
- Johann Caspar Timroth (1661–1727), pastor of Udersleben
- Christian August Heinrich Timroth (1729–1793), Mayor of Neustäddel
- Heinrich Johann Friedrich (Alexander) von Timroth (1788–1848), Imperial Russian lieutenant general
- Carl August Richard Timroth (1833–1895), Chief of Staff of the Finnish Military District
- Alexander Reinhold Carl Lionel von Timroth (1865–1944), State Secretary of the State Council, senator
- Johann Hieronymus Heinrich Christian (von) Tiemroth (1766–1840), Danish violinist and concertmaster, teacher to C.E.F. Weyse
- Christian Tiemroth (1799–1888), Danish member of parliament and colonial official
- Alexander Dmitrievich Timroth, Russian literary scholar and director of the Yasnaya Polyana museum
- Edvin Tiemroth (1915–1984), Danish actor and film director
- Lene Tiemroth (1946–2016), Danish actress
- Henrik Tiemroth (born 1998), Award-winning legal essayist
