= Wilhelm von Kügelgen =

German painter and memoirist (1802–1867)

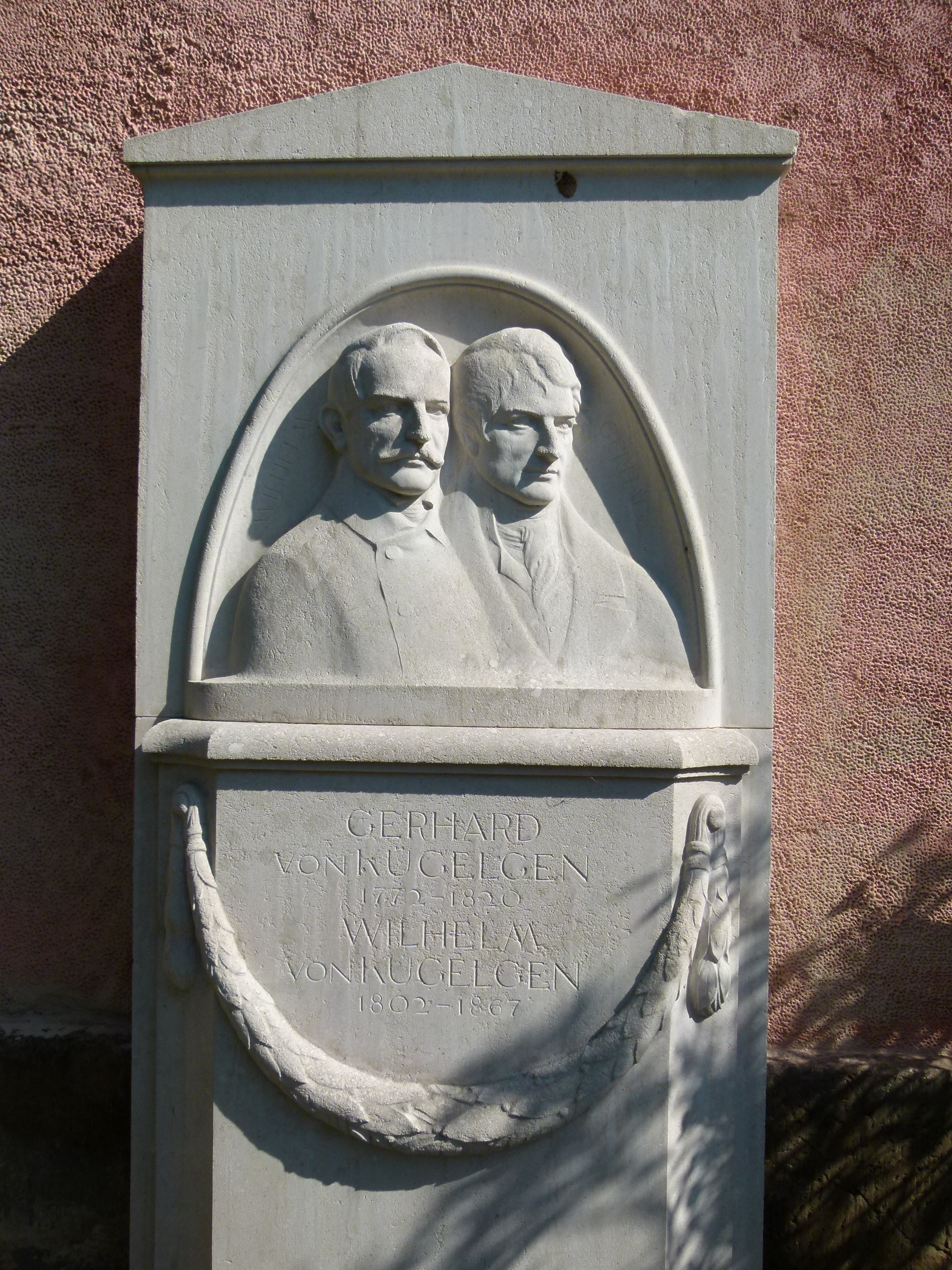
Memorial stone for Wilhelm von Kügelgen and his father Gerhard in Loschwitz Cemetery

Wilhelm Georg Alexander von Kügelgen (20 November 1802, in St.Petersburg – 25 May 1867, in Ballenstedt) was a German portrait and history painter, writer, and chamberlain at the court of Anhalt-Bernburg. He is best known for his posthumously published memoirs, which have gone through many editions from 17 different publishers.

== Life ==
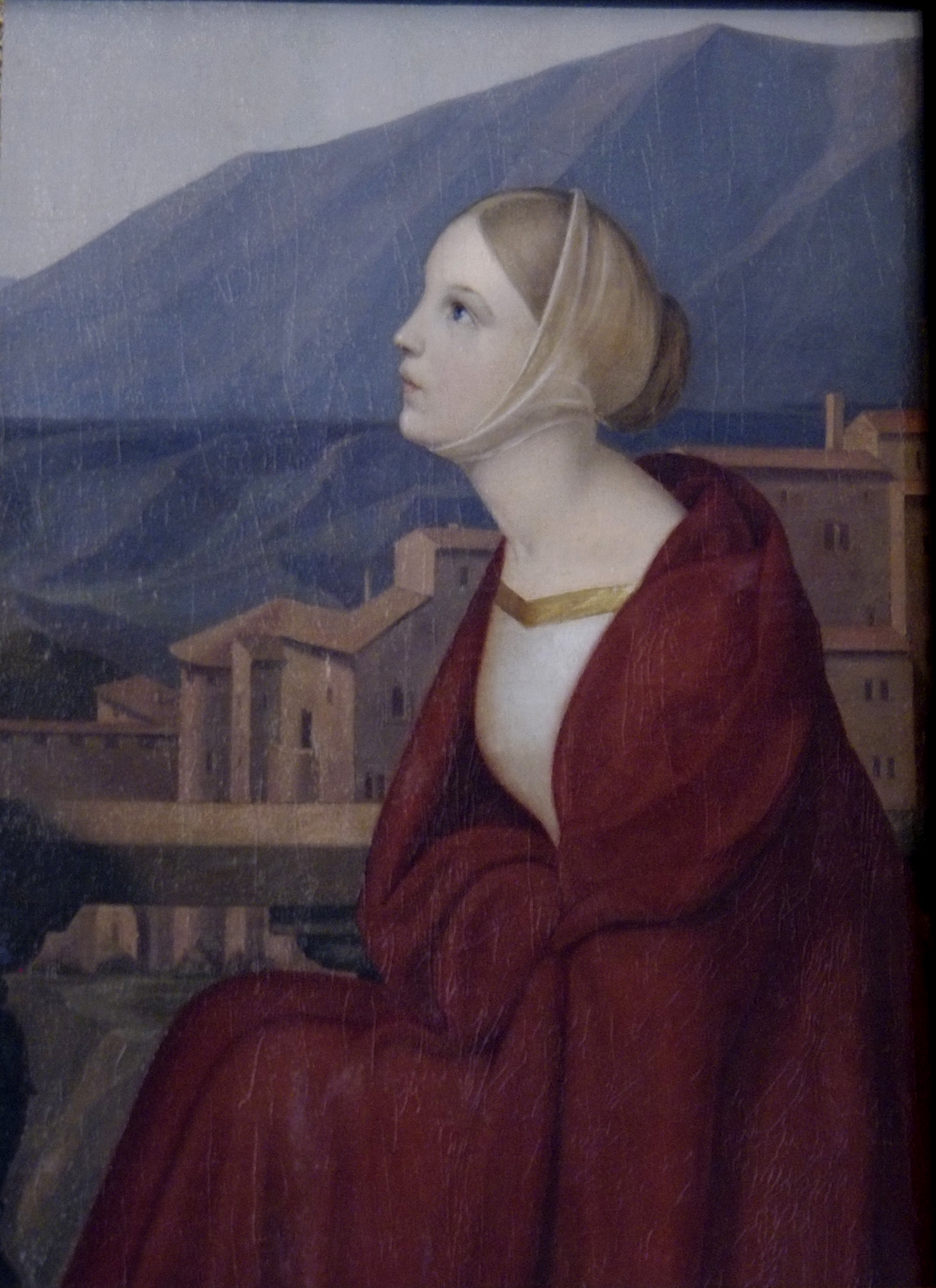
Julie Krummacher, who would later become Wilhelm's wife (1825/26)

He was the son of portrait and history painter Gerhard von Kügelgen. The home where he grew up in Dresden is now the Kügelgenhaus Museum. He attended the Gymnasium in Bernburg (Saale) and studied at the Dresden Academy of Fine Arts. When he was eighteen, his father was murdered during a robbery, creating an emotional crisis that challenged his religious beliefs. From 1825 to 1826, he lived in Rome, where he became friends with fellow painter Ludwig Richter. It was at this time that he began to suffer from progressive colorblindness.

In 1827, he married Julie Krummacher (1804–1909), daughter of Friedrich Adolf Krummacher, the evangelical theologian. They had six children. In 1833, he became the Court Painter at the Anhalt-Bernburg summer residence in Ballenstedt and remained there the rest of his life. From 1853 to 1863, he served as personal chamberlain to Duke Alexander Karl, who was suffering from a severe mental illness. During these years, he increasingly turned from painting to writing.

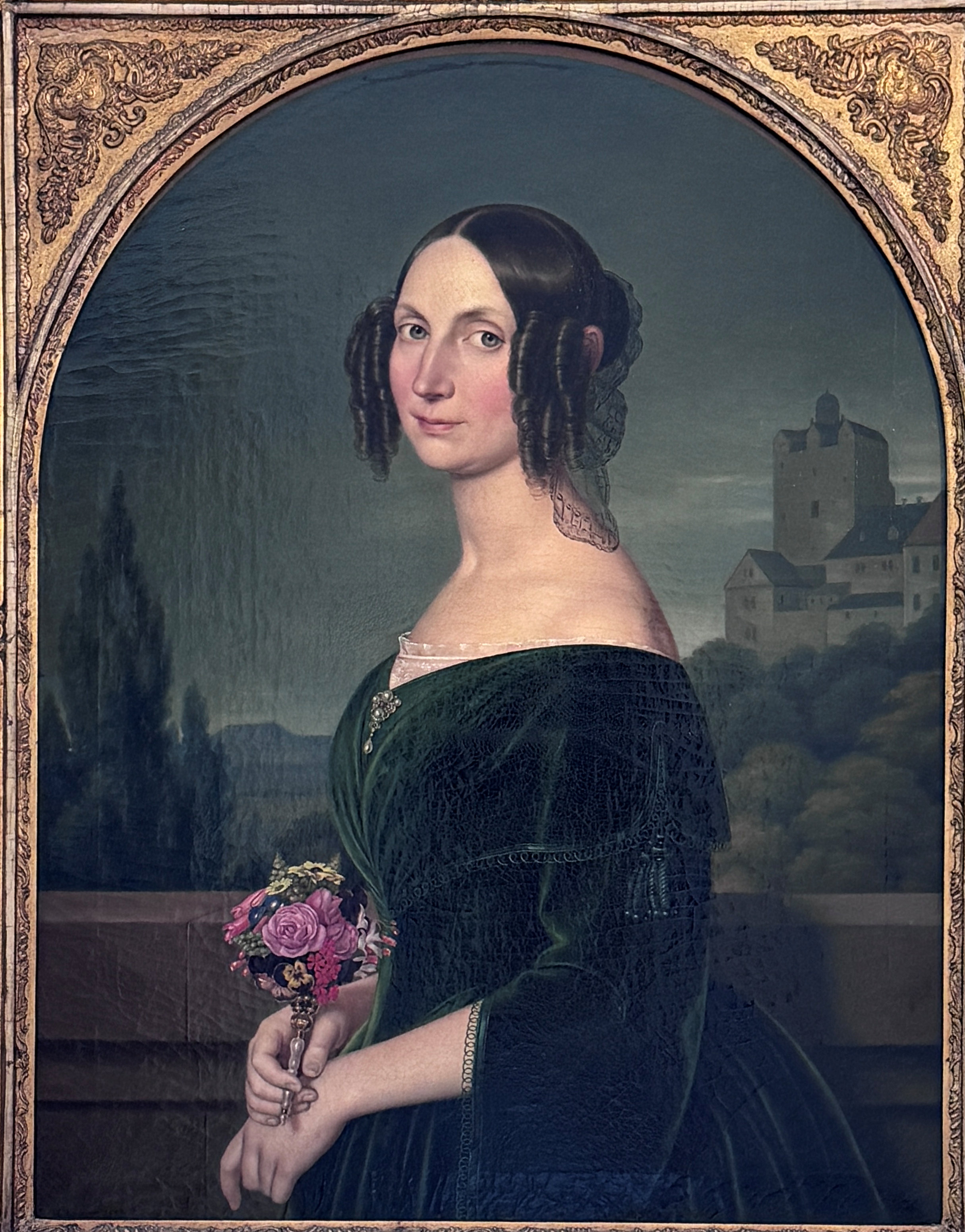
Friederike of Anhalt-Bernburg, painted by Kügelgen, 1845, Anhaltische Gemäldegalerie Dessau

In 1870, his memoirs were published by Philipp von Nathusius. They were given the title Jugenderinnerungen eines alten Mannes (Childhood Memories of an Old Man). These stories from his youth quickly became popular reading for the German middle-class. Their 230th edition appeared in 1922. An English translation was made under the title Bygone Days: Or, an Old Man's Reminiscences of His Youth. Several editions in German and English are available as reprints.

Since 1993, the Kunstkreis Sachsen-Anhalt in Bernburg has awarded an annual "Wilhelm von Kügelgen Scholarship" to art students.
