= House of Stammern =

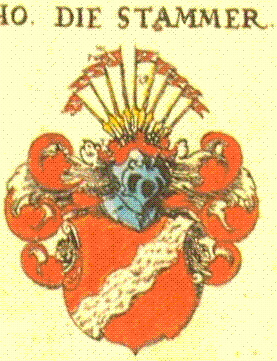
Coat of arms according to Siebmacher

The House of Stammern, also Stammer, was an ancient, knightly, Saxon, aristocratic family.

== History ==
The family was first recorded in 1295 when a certain Conradus dictus Stammern was mentioned. The family had estates in Anhalt around and in Ballenstedt, and including Ermsleben, Görlsdorf, Polleben, Wedlitz, Westdorf and Wörmlitz. From 1420 they also owned Balgstädt. Bishop Henry of Stammer was dean (Stiftshauptmann) in Zeitz from 1471 to 1476 and sat in Plotha in 1482 and in Balgstädt in 1483. Adrian Arndt and Henning of Stammer were members of the Fruitbearing Society. In 1752 Carl Friedrich von Stammer was a member of the Naumburg Cathedral Chapter. Eckhardt August von Stammer (1772) was the commander (Landkomtur) of the Kommende of Lucklum in the province or Ballei of Saxony within the Order of Teutonic Knights.

== Personalities ==
- Henry II of Stammer, Bishop of Naumburg (1466–1481)
- Hennig Albert of Stammer († 1884), Deacon of the Collegiate Church of Wurzen, MP in the Saxon Parliament (Landtag)

== Coat of arms ==
The coat of arms according to Siebmacher's Heraldry of 1605 shows a silver bend sinister on a red field. The mantling is red and silver. The crest is a sheaf of red pennons on golden shafts.

== Sources ==
- Heinz Wießner: Das Bistum Naumburg 1 – Die Diözese 2. In: Max-Planck-Institut für Geschichte (Hg.): Germania Sacra, NF 35,2, Die Bistumer der Kirchenprovinz Magdeburg. Berlin/New York 1998. pp.919–929.
- Rüdiger Bier: 1500 Jahre Geschichte und Geschichten der herrschaftlichen Sitze zu Kirchscheidungen und Burgscheidungen, Eigenverlag Rittergut Kirchscheidungen 2009.
