= Weddersleben =

- Stadtteil of Thale
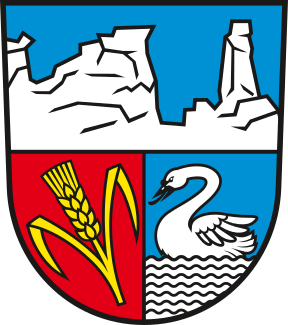
- Coat of arms
- Interactive map of Weddersleben
- Location within Germany Location within Saxony-Anhalt
- Coordinates: 51°45′53″N 11°5′13″E
- Country: Germany
- State: Saxony-Anhalt
- District: Harz
- Municipal assoc.: Thale
- Town: Thale

Area
  - Total: 6.43 km^{2} (2.48 sq mi)
- Elevation: 145 m (476 ft)

Population (2006-12-31)
  - Total: 1,072
  - Density: 167/km^{2} (432/sq mi)
- Time zone: UTC+01:00 (CET)
  - Summer (DST): UTC+02:00 (CEST)
- Postal codes: 06502
- Dialling codes: 03946
- Vehicle registration: HZ

Weddersleben (German pronunciation: [ˈvɛdɐsleːbn̩]) is a village and a former municipality in the district of Harz, Saxony-Anhalt, in the Harz area. Since 1 January 2009, it is part of the town Thale.

The village is well known for being located adjacent to the famed natural rock formation known as the Teufelsmauer, or "Devil's Wall" in English. Surrounding forest area has numerous paths for biking and hiking, making it a popular tourist destination for nature seekers. Among the many natural formations in the area, the Bode River flows by the edges of the village.
