= Ballenstedt =

- Town
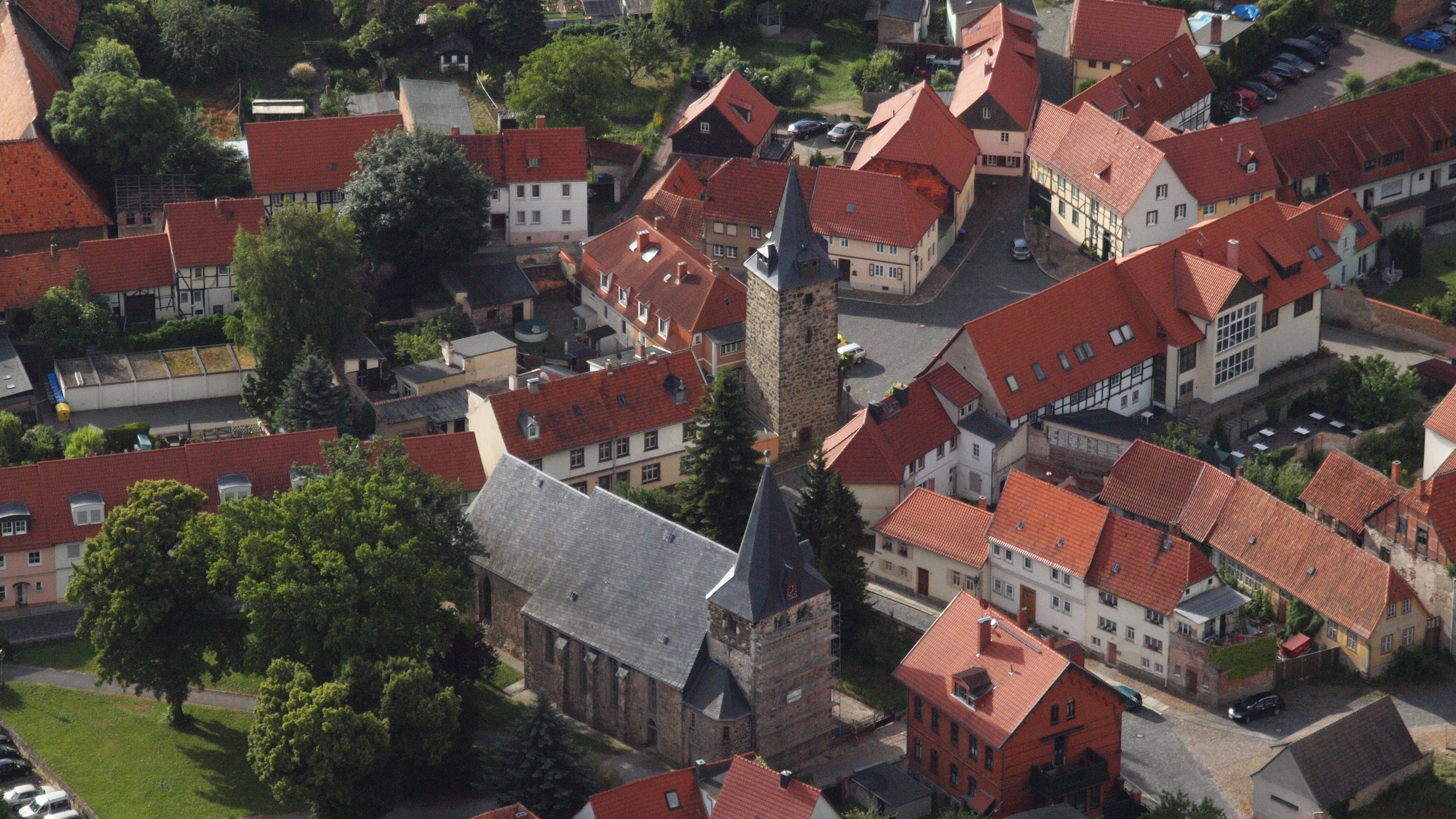
- Old town

- Coat of arms

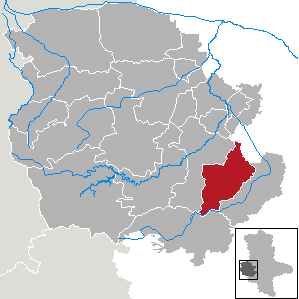
- Location of Ballenstedt within Harz district
- Interactive map of Ballenstedt
- Location within Germany Location within Saxony-Anhalt
- Coordinates: 51°43′12″N 11°14′15″E
- Country: Germany
- State: Saxony-Anhalt
- District: Harz

Government
  - Mayor (2022–29): Dr. Michael Knoppik

Area
  - Total: 86.65 km^{2} (33.46 sq mi)
- Elevation: 236 m (774 ft)

Population (2025-12-31)
  - Total: 8,346
  - Density: 96.32/km^{2} (249.5/sq mi)
- Time zone: UTC+01:00 (CET)
  - Summer (DST): UTC+02:00 (CEST)
- Postal codes: 06493
- Dialling codes: 039483
- Vehicle registration: HZ
- Website: www.ballenstedt.de

Ballenstedt (German pronunciation: [ˈbalənʃtɛt]) is a town in the Harz district, in the German state of Saxony-Anhalt.

== Geography ==
It is situated at the northern rim of the Harz mountain range, about 10 km (6 mi) southeast of Quedlinburg. The municipal area comprises the villages of Asmusstedt, Badeborn, Opperode, Radisleben, and Rieder. Ballenstedt is a stop on the scenic Romanesque Road.

== History ==
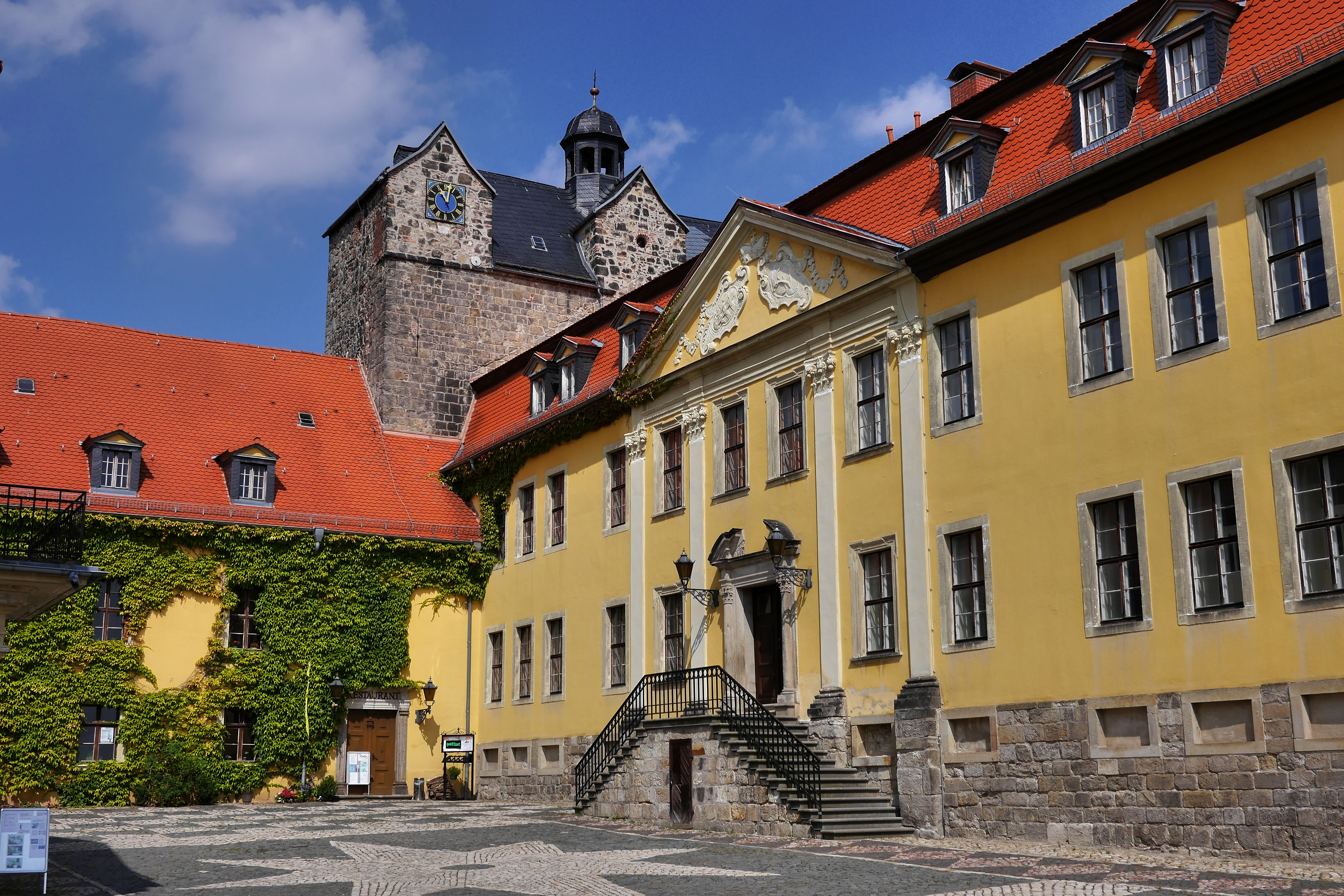
Ballenstedt Castle, courtyard

The Saxon count Esico of Ballenstedt (c. 1000–1059/60) was mentioned in a 1030 entry in the medieval chronicles of the Annalista Saxo and in a 1036 deed issued by Emperor Conrad II. He was a son of one Count Adalbert, who held the office of a Vogt of Nienburg Abbey, and Hidda, a daughter of Margrave Odo I of the Saxon Ostmark. Esico, whose sister Uta married Margrave Eckard II of Meissen is considered the progenitor of the House of Ascania. He had a collegiate church erected in Ballenstedt, dedicated to Saints Pancras and Abundius, in the presence of Emperor Henry III in 1046.

Ballenstedt church was mentioned in a charter of 1073 by Henry IV in which the emperor confirmed to the church the possession of 21 mansi previously granted by his father Henry III. In 1123 Otto the Rich together with his son Albert the Bear, who would become the first ruler of Brandenburg, established a Benedictine monastery at the site. Albert and was buried at the crypt of the abbey church in 1070; a monument for him is located in the town's park. Albert's grandson Henry I became the first Prince of Anhalt in 1218.

In 1512 the citizens of Ballenstedt were vested with brewing rights by the Ascanian prince Wolfgang of Anhalt-Köthen. After Wolfgang met with Martin Luther at the 1521 Diet of Worms, he became one of the first Protestant rulers in the Holy Roman Empire. Ballenstedt Abbey was stormed and plundered during the German Peasants' War, whereafter Prince Wolfgang had the monastery secularised in 1525. He chose Ballenstedt as a residence and granted it town privileges in 1543. It received city walls in 1551; a town hall was first mentioned in 1582. As the Anhalt princes supported King Christian IV of Denmark during the Thirty Years' War, Ballenstedt was raided and plundered by Imperial troops under Albrecht von Wallenstein in 1626.

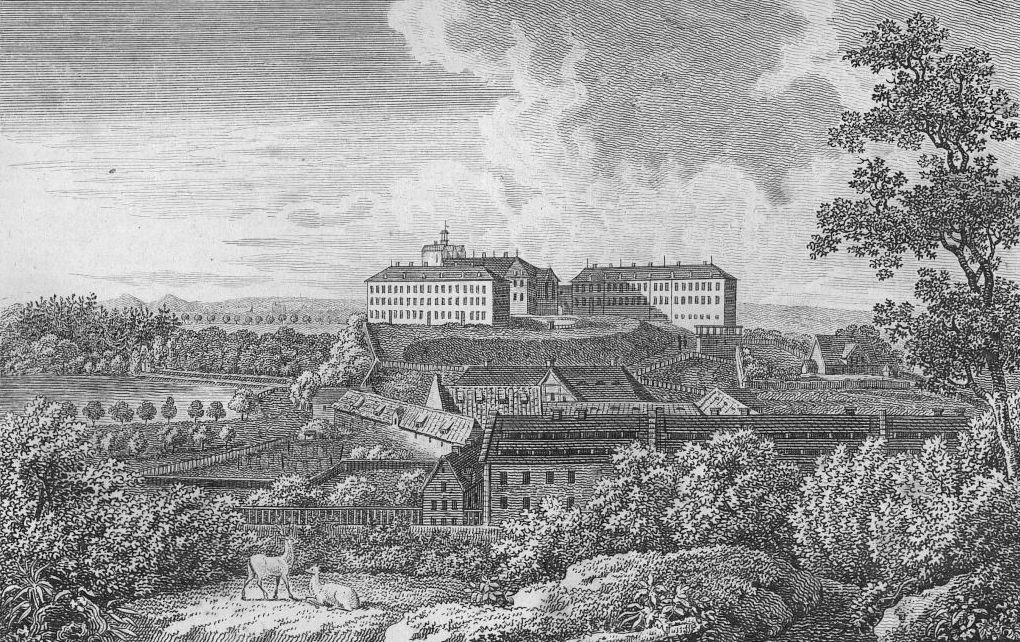
Ballenstedt Castle, about 1837

After the war, the town and the former monastery were rebuilt as a Baroque summer residence by the Ascanian princes of Anhalt-Bernburg. In 1765 the enlightened prince Frederick Albert completely moved his residence from Bernburg to Ballenstedt Castle and induced a time of prosperity, including the erection of a castle theatre in 1788, the oldest theatre in Saxony-Anhalt and the domain of composers like Albert Lortzing and Franz Liszt.

A part of the re-unified Duchy of Anhalt from 1863 on, Ballenstedt became known as a residential town for the well-to-do retired like Princess Friederike of Schleswig-Holstein-Sonderburg-Glücksburg, who died at Ballenstedt Castle in 1902, or the painter and author Wilhelm von Kügelgen, whose house is now a museum.

== Politics ==
Town hall (2026)

Seats in the municipal assembly (Stadtrat) as of 2004 elections:

- Christian Democratic Union: 8 (41.2%)
- The Left: 4 (18.2%)
- Free Voters: 3 (12.6%)
- Free Democratic Party: 3 (12.5%)
- Social Democratic Party of Germany: 1 (7.5%)
- Independent: 1 (5.4%)

The coat of arms is derived from the insignia of the Counts of Ballenstedt, which is also the origin of the coat of arms of Saxony. It was first manifested in 1560 after Ballenstedt received town rights.

== Places of interest ==
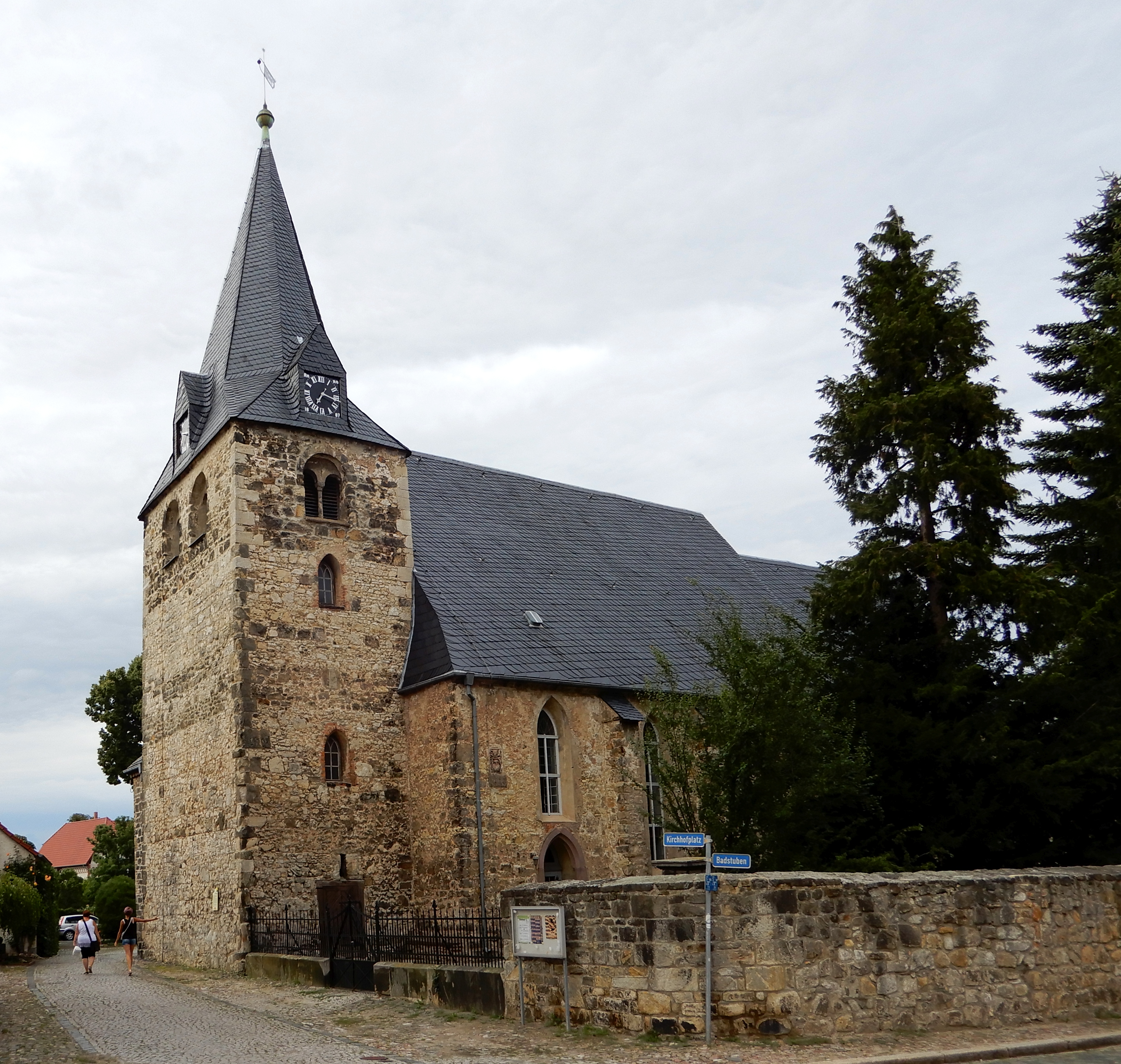
St. Nicholas in the Altstadt in 2017

- Ballenstedt Castle: Baroque three-winged building, renovated in the 18th century, grave of Albert the Bear
- Castle Park: created by Peter Joseph Lenné; castle and castle park belong to the Saxony-Anhalt Garden Dreams project
- Ballenstedt Castle Theatre: played by Albert Lortzing and Franz Liszt
- Großer Gasthof castle hotel: originally built in 1733 as an armoury, converted in 1756 by the Brunswick-Wolfenbüttel ducal master builder, Martin Peltier de Belfort, into a guest house
- Local History Museum, opposite the Großer Gasthof in the upper part of the avenue
- Kügelgen House, Kügelgenstr. 35a
- Yellow House (Gelbes Haus), on the exit to the town towards Rieder, built as a roadside toll house
- Allee: representative, a kilometre long approach to the castle, centre point of the town
- Old Town Hall (Altes Rathaus): timber-framed building erected in 1683
- New Town Hall (Neues Rathaus): representative building, built in 1906 based on a design by Berlin architect Alfred Messel
- St. Nicholas' Church: Late Gothic church, built in 1326, burnt down in 1498, rebuilt in 1501
- Town wall, can still be seen in Wallstraße
- Wall towers along the town wall (Oberturm, Unterturm, Marktturm – the latter is accessible, key in the restaurant opposite)
- Swimming baths, built 1907–08
- Teufelsmauer (Harz)
- Gegensteine nature reserve
- Bismarck Tower, Opperode
- Roseburg (castle)
- Oberhof Ballenstedt

== Transport ==
Ballenstedt is located at the Bundesstraße (federal highway) 185, leading to the Bundesstraße 6 and the Bundesautobahn 14. Train service was suspended in 2003. A small asphalt runway is about 5 km (3 mi) outside the town.

== Notable people ==
=== Born in Ballenstedt ===
- Uta von Ballenstedt (1000 - before 1046), founder of the Naumburg Cathedral
- Johann Arndt (1555–1621), theologian
- Pauline zur Lippe (1769–1820), regent of the Principality of Lippe
- Caroline Bardua (1781–1864), painter

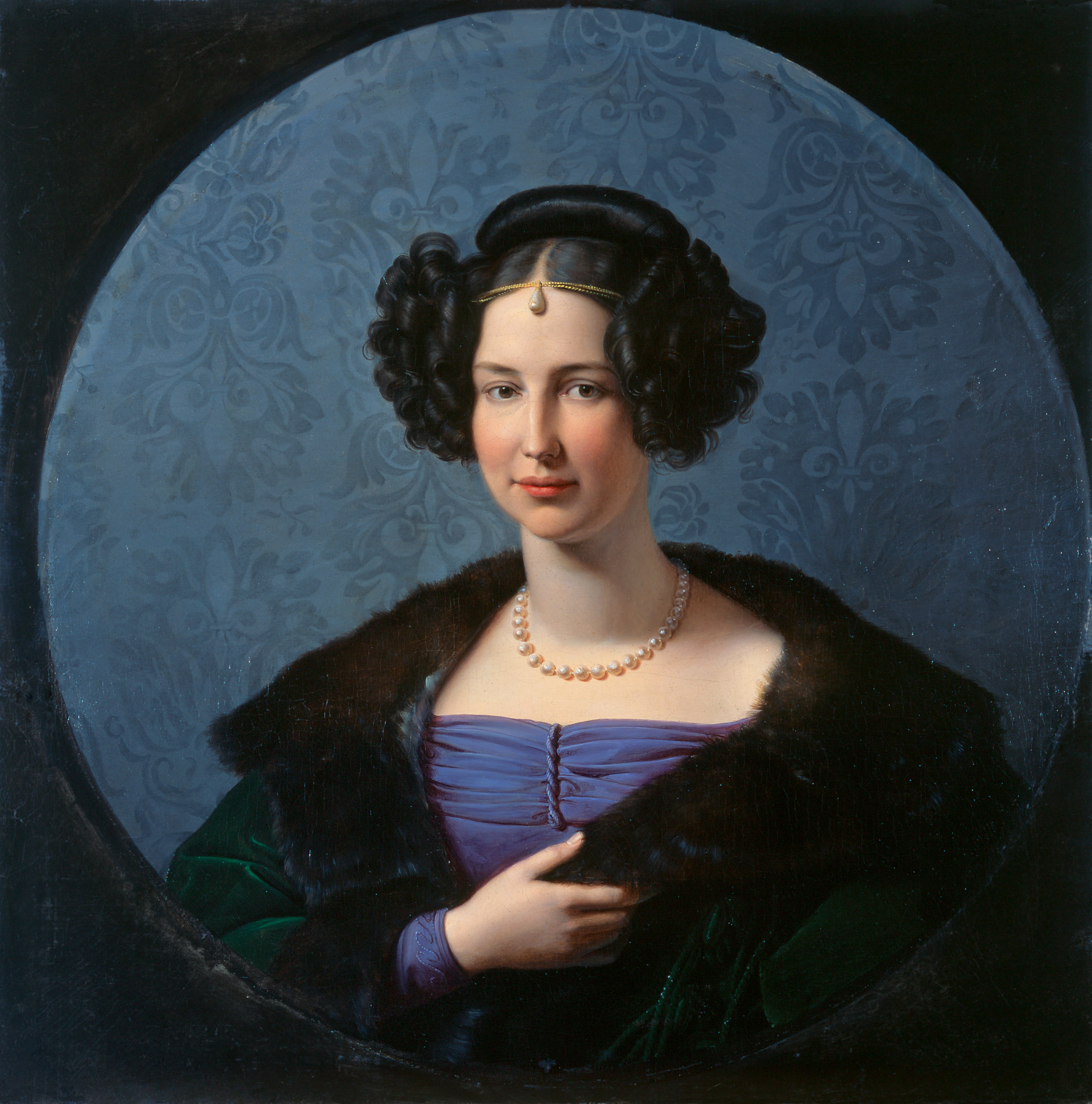
Wilhelmine Luise Princess of Prussia

- Princess Louise of Anhalt-Bernburg (1799–1882), Princess of Prussia
- Gustav Strube (1867–1953), composer
- Wilhelm von Krosigk (1871–1953), officer of Imperial Navy, ship commander, Rear Admiral
- Wilhelm Thiele (1897–1990), politician (NSDAP)
- Princess Marie-Auguste of Anhalt (1898–1983), Princess
- Eduard, Prince of Anhalt (born 1941), since 1963 head of the house Anhalt-Ascania
- Justus Pfaue (1942–2014), novelist and screenwriter
- Eckhard Lesse (born 1948), long-distance runner

=== Died in Ballenstedt ===
- Karl Christian Agthe, composer, born 16 June 1762 in Hettstedt, died 27 November 1797
- Wilhelm von Kügelgen, painter, born 20 November 1802 in Saint Petersburg, died 25 May 1867
- Wilhelm Vöge, art historian, born 16 February 1868 in Bremen, died 30 December 1952.

== Twin towns ==
- Kronberg im Taunus, Germany
