= Roseburg =

Roseburg may refer:

In the United States:

- Roseburg, Grant County, Indiana
- Roseburg, Union County, Indiana
- Roseburg, Kentucky
- Roseburg, Michigan
- Roseburg, Oregon
- Roseburg, Pennsylvania

In Germany:

- Roseburg, Schleswig-Holstein
