= Rieder =

- Ortsteil of Ballenstedt
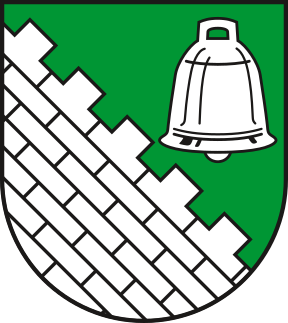
- Coat of arms
- Interactive map of Rieder
- Location within Germany Location within Saxony-Anhalt
- Coordinates: 51°44′N 11°10′E
- Country: Germany
- State: Saxony-Anhalt
- District: Harz
- Town: Ballenstedt

Area
  - Total: 21.41 km^{2} (8.27 sq mi)
- Elevation: 231 m (758 ft)

Population (2012-12-31)
  - Total: 1,788
  - Density: 83.51/km^{2} (216.3/sq mi)
- Time zone: UTC+01:00 (CET)
  - Summer (DST): UTC+02:00 (CEST)
- Postal codes: 06507
- Dialling codes: 039485
- Vehicle registration: HZ
- Website: www.rieder-harz.de

Rieder is a village and a former municipality in the district of Harz, in Saxony-Anhalt, Germany. Since 1 December 2013, it is part of the town Ballenstedt. Between 1 January 2011 and 19 February 2013, it was part of the town Quedlinburg.

There is a grauwacke quarry here which is also checkpoint 61 on the Harzer Wandernadel.
