= Timmenrode =

- Stadtteil of Blankenburg am Harz
- Interactive map of Timmenrode
- Location within Germany Location within Saxony-Anhalt
- Coordinates: 51°46′N 11°0′E
- Country: Germany
- State: Saxony-Anhalt
- District: Harz
- Town: Blankenburg am Harz

Area
  - Total: 6.28 km^{2} (2.42 sq mi)
- Elevation: 211 m (692 ft)

Population (2006-12-31)
  - Total: 1,068
  - Density: 170/km^{2} (440/sq mi)
- Time zone: UTC+01:00 (CET)
  - Summer (DST): UTC+02:00 (CEST)
- Postal codes: 06502
- Dialling codes: 03947
- Vehicle registration: HZ

Timmenrode is a village and a former municipality in the district of Harz, in Saxony-Anhalt, Germany.

Since 1 January 2010, it is part of the town Blankenburg am Harz.

== Notable people ==
- Timroth, noble family
