= Viktorshöhe =

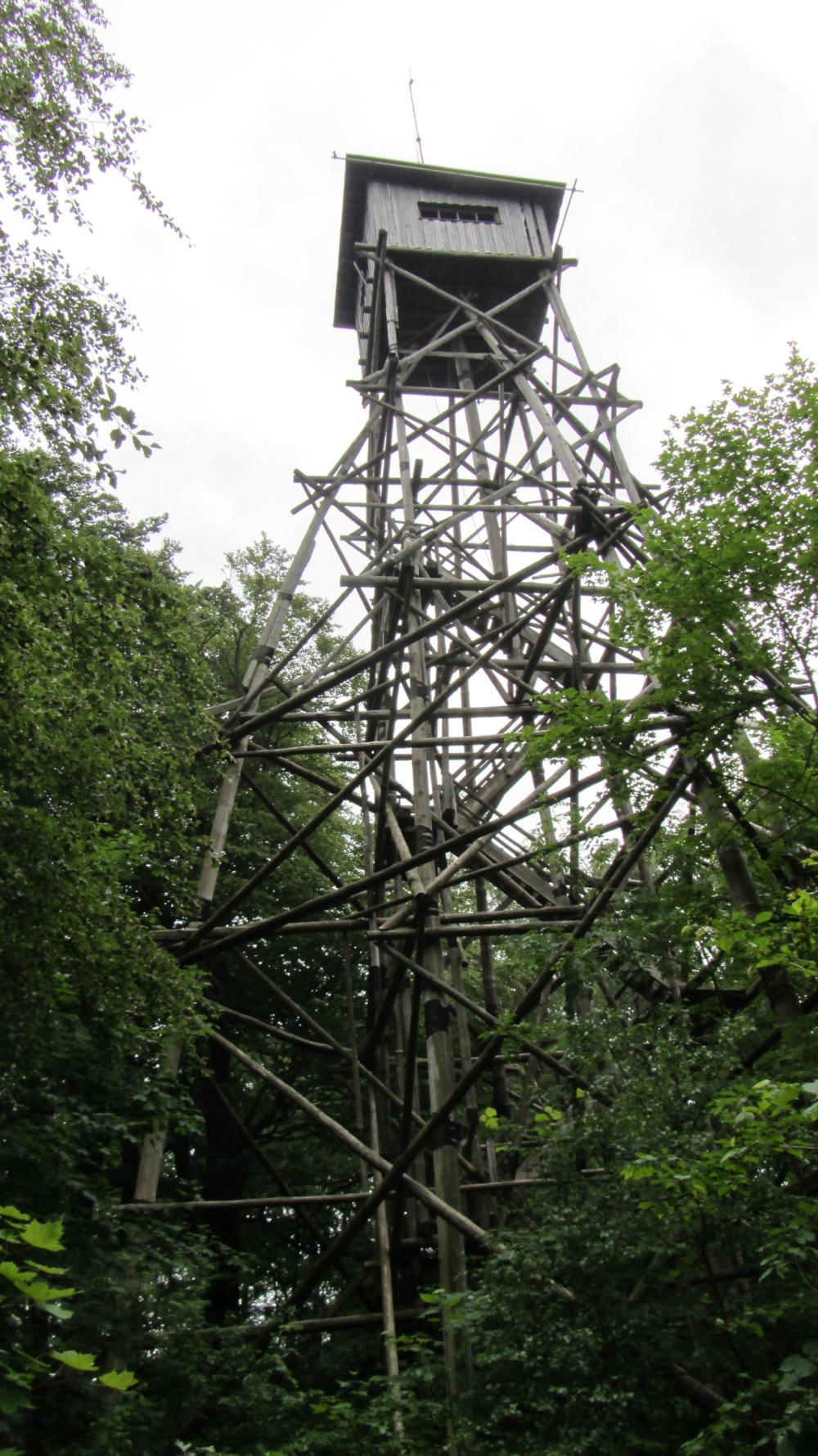
- Wooden observation tower before its collapse

Highest point
- Elevation: 581.5 m (1,908 ft)
- Coordinates: 51°41′09″N 11°04′57″E

Geography
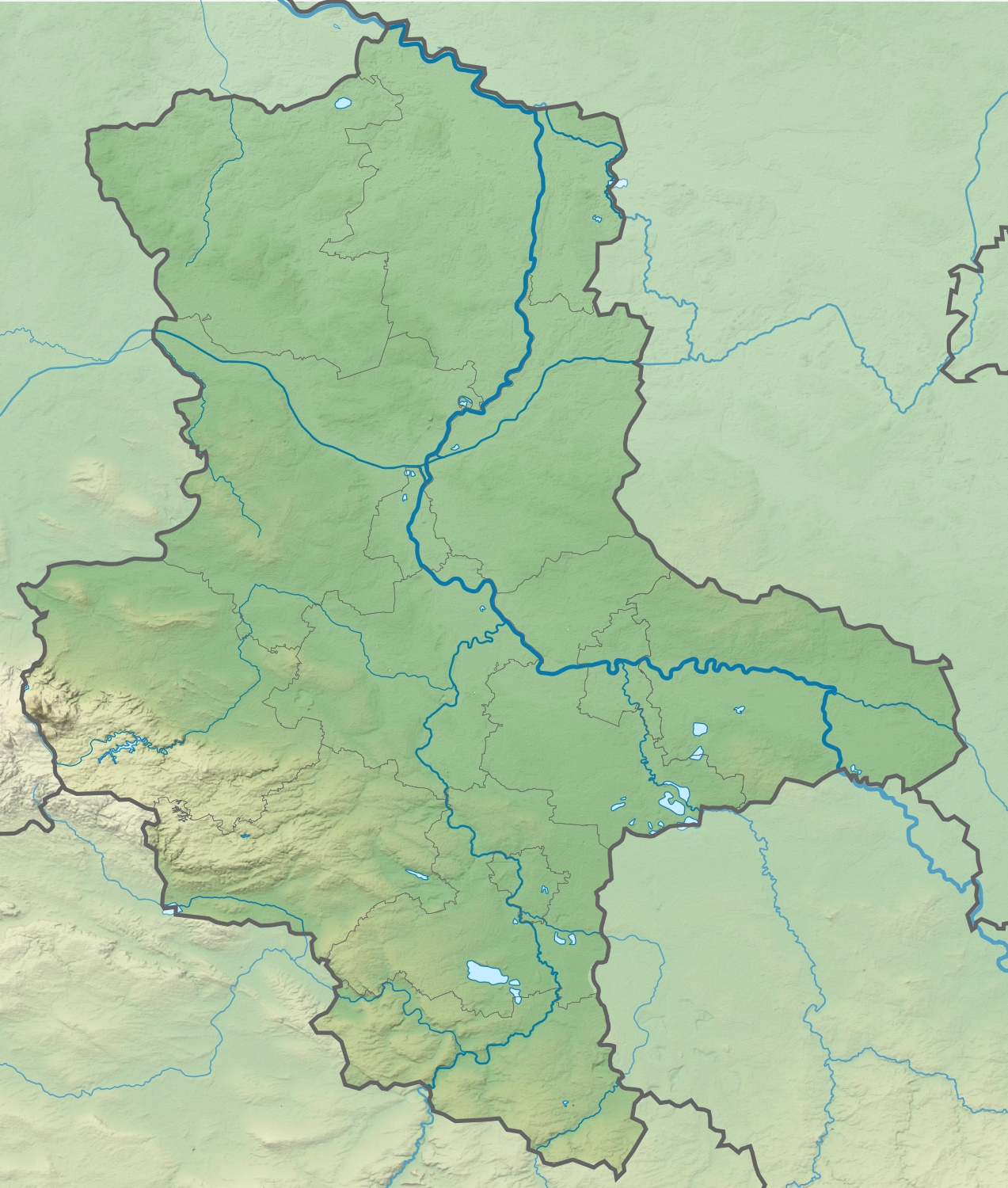
- Location within Saxony-Anhalt
- Location: Saxony-Anhalt, Germany
- Parent range: Harz Mountains

The Viktorshöhe is a hill, 581.5 metres high, in the Harz mountains of central Germany. It lies on the Ramberg massif within the boundaries of Gernrode, a part of Quedlinburg, and about 3 kilometres northeast of Friedrichsbrunn.

== History ==
The first hunting lodge on the Viktorshöhe had been built next to a small well house at the behest of Prince Victor Frederick in 1750. And the first observation tower here also appeared as early as the 18th century. In 1892 a building on the Viktorshöhe had become a popular pub catering for day trippers. In 1897 a 20-metre-high tower was built, made from oak logs, from which there were views as far as the Kyffhäuser. In 1927 the forestry authority, who had the right to sell wine and beer from their lodge, was disbanded. The last foresters were recorded as Messrs. Jacobi and Sachtler. The property, however, continued to be managed and extended.

In 1946 the Anhalt governor, Heinrich Deist senior, stayed at the Viktorshöhe Guest House. He was witness to a night-time raid on the pub on 14 July 1946 perpetrated by three Soviet soldiers. The owner of the Viktorshöhe received stab wounds to his back and was hit with a revolver. Six hundred Reichsmarks were stolen, together with a radio and clothing. Even the guests were robbed. Until 1958, Saalmann was the publican of the Viktorshöhe. In 1959 the Viktorshöhe became a works holiday home and was close to the public as a result.

At the end of the 1970s the building complex became a company holiday home for the Draht- und Seilwerke Rothenburg (Rothenburg Wire and Cable Company). The next-door restaurant was a favourite walking and excursion halt. In 1990 the guest house was closed. The buildings on the Viktorshöhe became empty during the 1990s and are gradually falling into ruin. The remaining furniture lies scattered about the area and gives an impression of destruction and neglect, reminiscent of war.

Near the summit a wooden tower stood until it collapsed in November 2012, which had been used as a fire lookout tower and site for aerials of various radio services. In the 1980s, because of its good location, the tower was used by radio hams of the then Halle district contest team, including the amateur ham callsign "Y34H", used by numerous international amateur radio competitions. This tower was not built as a viewing tower, but as the site for a raised trigonometric sign above a trig point of the first order by the state survey and, for that reason, used as an observation tower. As a result of advances in technology this trig sign - like others in the other federal states - lost its significance.

== Surrounding area ==
In the vicinity of the Viktorshöhe there are several tourist attractions: the Große Teufelsmühle, the Bergrat Müller Teich (Teich = pond), the Bear Monument, the ruined castle of Erichsberg, the Bremer Teich campsite and the Erichburger Teich.

== Bibliography ==
- Rosemarie und Gerhard Kellermann (2013), Chronik der Stadt Gernrode, Gernroder Kulturverein Andreas Popperodt e. V.
