= Bergrat Müller Pond =

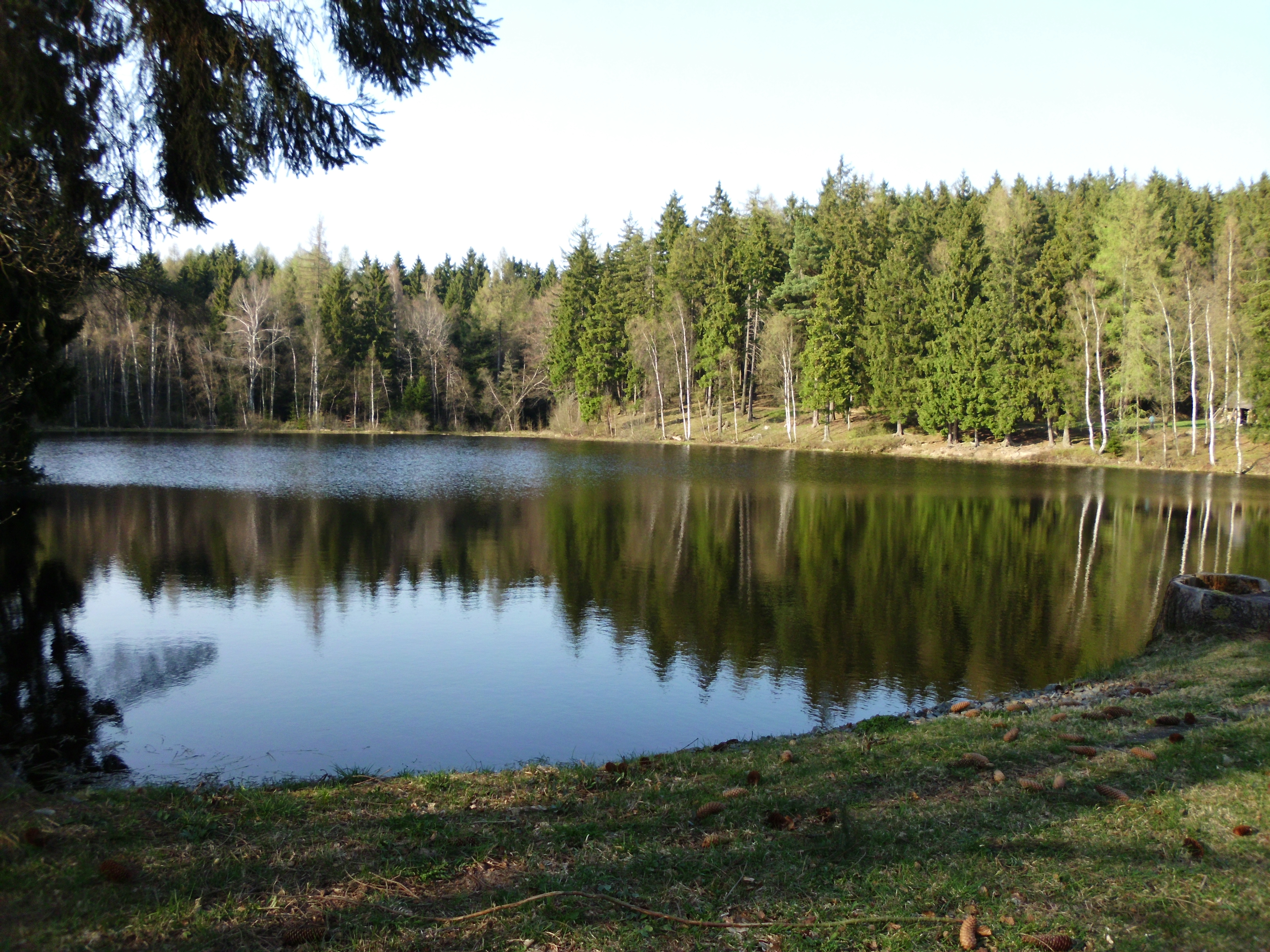
- Interactive map of Bergrat Müller Pond
- Location: Harz, Harz county, Saxony-Anhalt
- Coordinates: 51°40′46.5″N 11°3′50.3″E
- Construction began: 1737–1738

Dam and spillways
- Type of dam: earth-fill dam
- Impounds: Friedenstalbach

Reservoir
- Surface area: 1.3 ha (3.2 acres)
- Normal elevation: 500.3 m above sea level (NN)

The Bergrat Müller Pond (German: Bergrat-Müller-Teich), named after a former mining director, Müller, in the Harz mountains of central Germany is a storage pond laid out from 1737 to 1738. It has an area of about 1.3 ha and lies in the forested southern part of the borough of Quedlinburg in the county of Harz in Saxony-Anhalt.

== Location ==
The reservoir lies on the southern slopes of the Ramberg massif in the Harz/Saxony-Anhalt Nature Park. Between Friedrichsbrunn (Thale), Alexisbad and Mägdesprung (both in the municipality of Harzgerode) it is located in woods 6.75 km (as the crow flies) southwest of Bad Suderode (Quedlinburg) immediately north of the town boundary of Quedlinburg with Harzgerode around 1.5 km southwest of the Viktorshöhe (581.5 m above sea level (NN)) at an elevation of 500.3 m above NN. The pond is fed and drained, like the Erichsburger Teich 400 stream metres to the south-southeast, by the Friedenstalbach to the southeast that flows into the River Selke. About 250 metres west of the dam is the Merkelbach Holiday Park (Ferienpark Merkelbach)

== History and description ==
The Bergrat Müller Pond was laid out from 1737 to 1738 to supply water for mining, some 30 years after the nearby Erichsburger Teich had been constructed in 1709. Water was stored in the pond in order to drive water wheels that drained the nearby pit of Prince Charles William and which, between 1708 and 1741, as well as pyrite and fluorite, produced annually 12,000 tonnes of chalcopyrite, from which about 25 t of copper was extracted. Near the pond lies an abandoned, heavily overgrown quarry, in which the Zweiglimmer granite of the Upper Carboniferous of the Ramberg massif may be seen at the surface with its well-developed weathering zones.

The pond is impounded by an earth-fill dam.

== Hiking ==
The pond is no. 190 in the system of checkpoints in the Harzer Wandernadel hiking network; the box with the stamp is located east of the dam. A few metres above the east shore of the pond stands a large refuge hut for hikers.

== See also ==
- List of waterbodies in Saxony-Anhalt
