= Ramberg (Harz) =

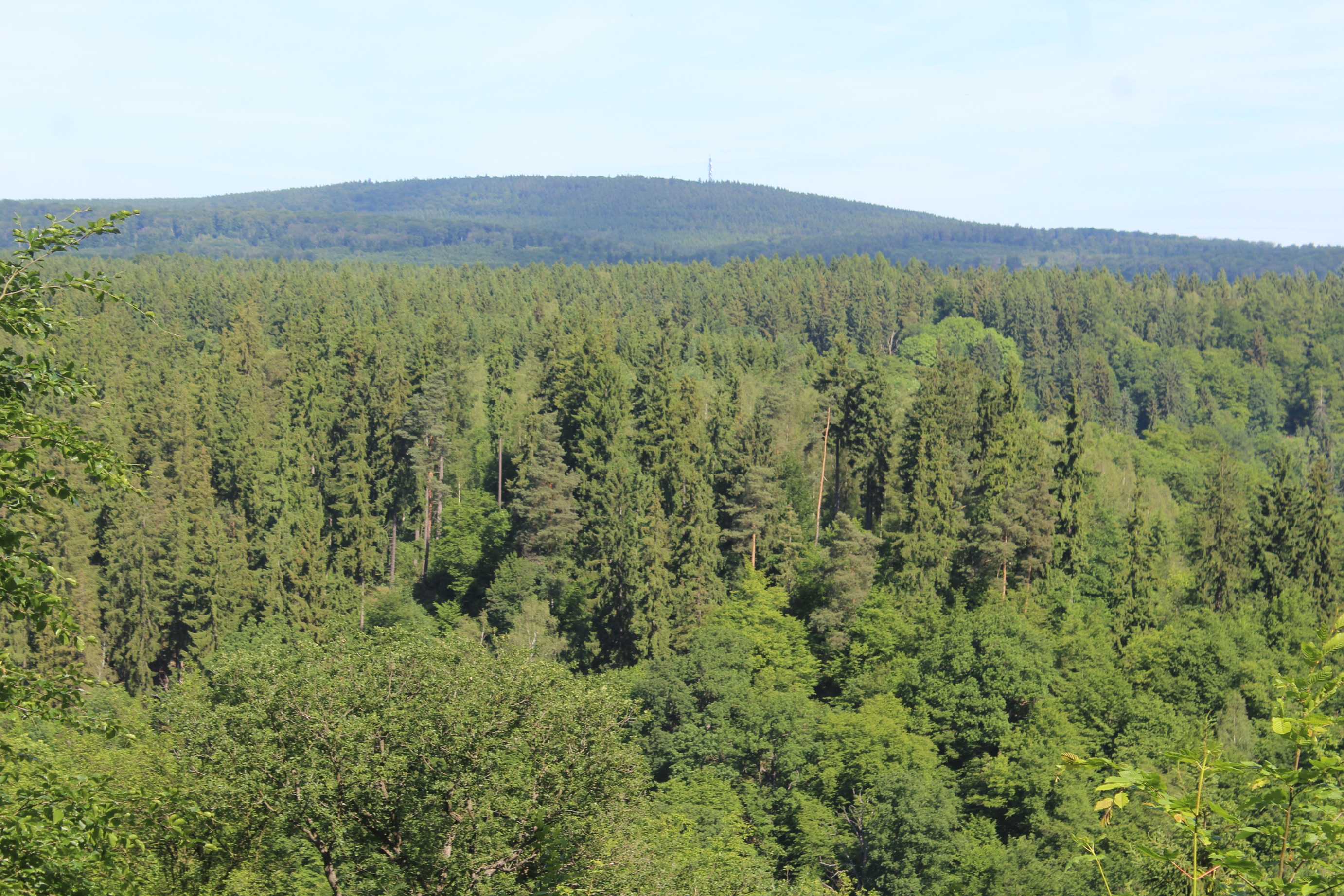

Highest point
- Elevation: 582 m (1,909 ft)
- Coordinates: 51°41′09″N 11°04′57″E

Geography
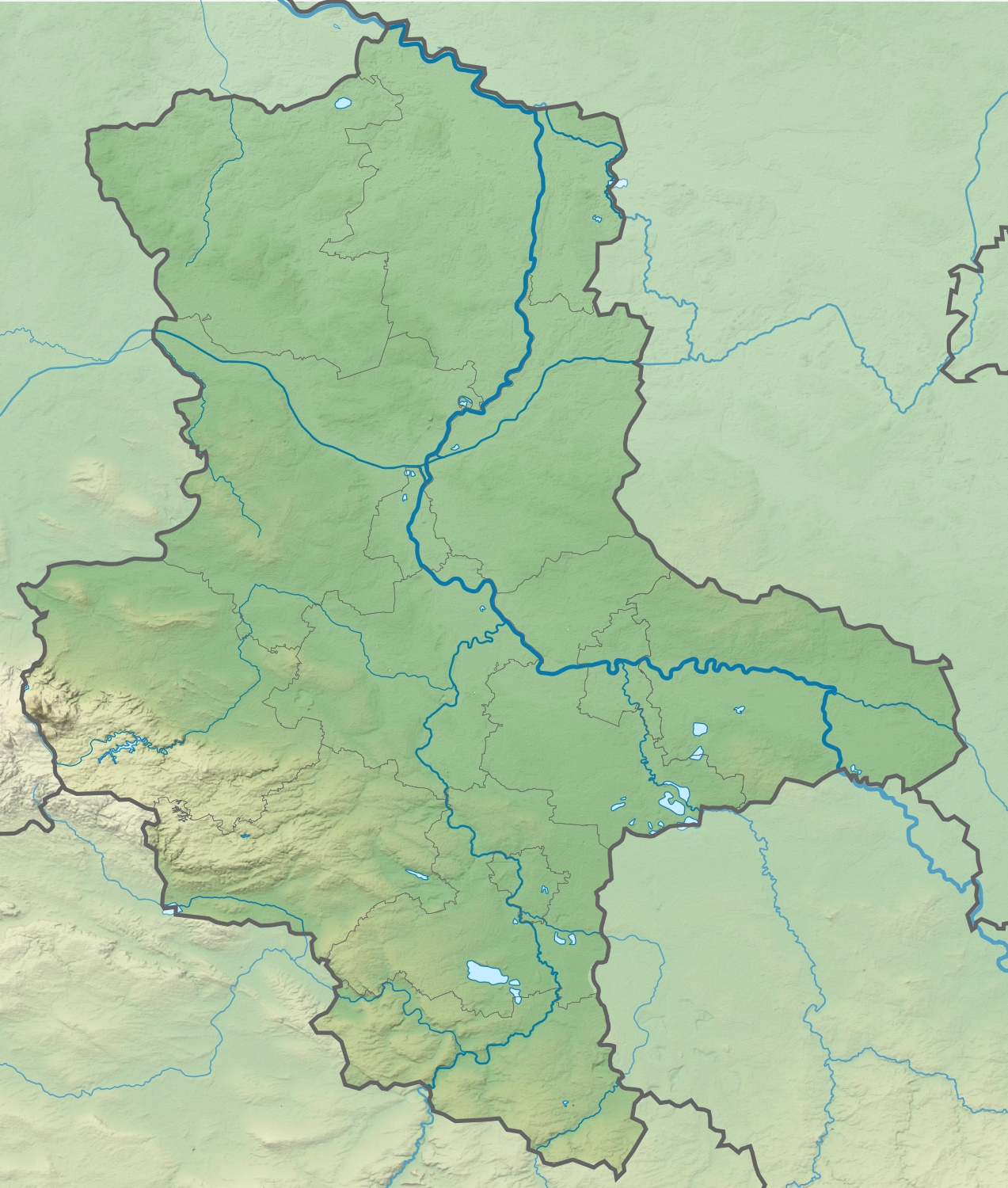
- Location within Saxony-Anhalt
- Location: Saxony-Anhalt, Germany
- Parent range: Harz Mountains

Geology
- Mountain type: Granite

The Ramberg (German pronunciation: [ˈʁambɛʁk]), also called the Ramberg Massif, is a granite massif, about 30 square kilometres in area, in the eastern part of the Harz Mountains of central Germany. It is located in the federal state of Saxony-Anhalt and lies southwest of Quedlinburg, between Friedrichsbrunn, Gernrode, Harzgerode and Thale. The Ramberg massif has a number of summits, the highest of which is the Viktorshöhe at 582 m above sea level (NN).

== Places of interest ==
In the vicinity of the Viktorshöhe are the two natural monuments, the Kleine Teufelsmühle and Große Teufelsmühle, two granite tors that are shrouded in legend. Also within the Ramberg are the Bremer Teich, the Bear Monument and the castles ruins of Erichsberg.

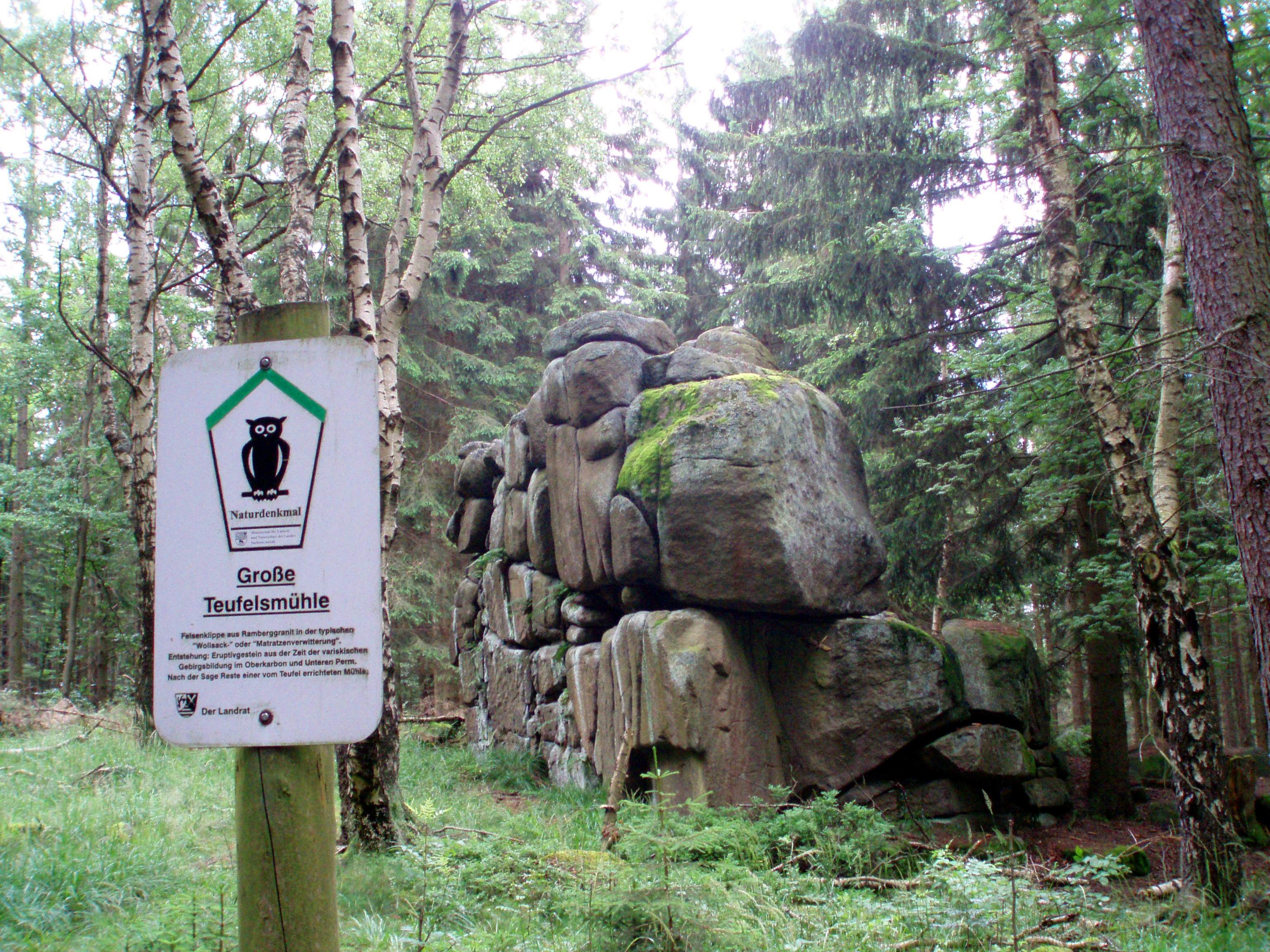
The Große Teufelsmühle tor

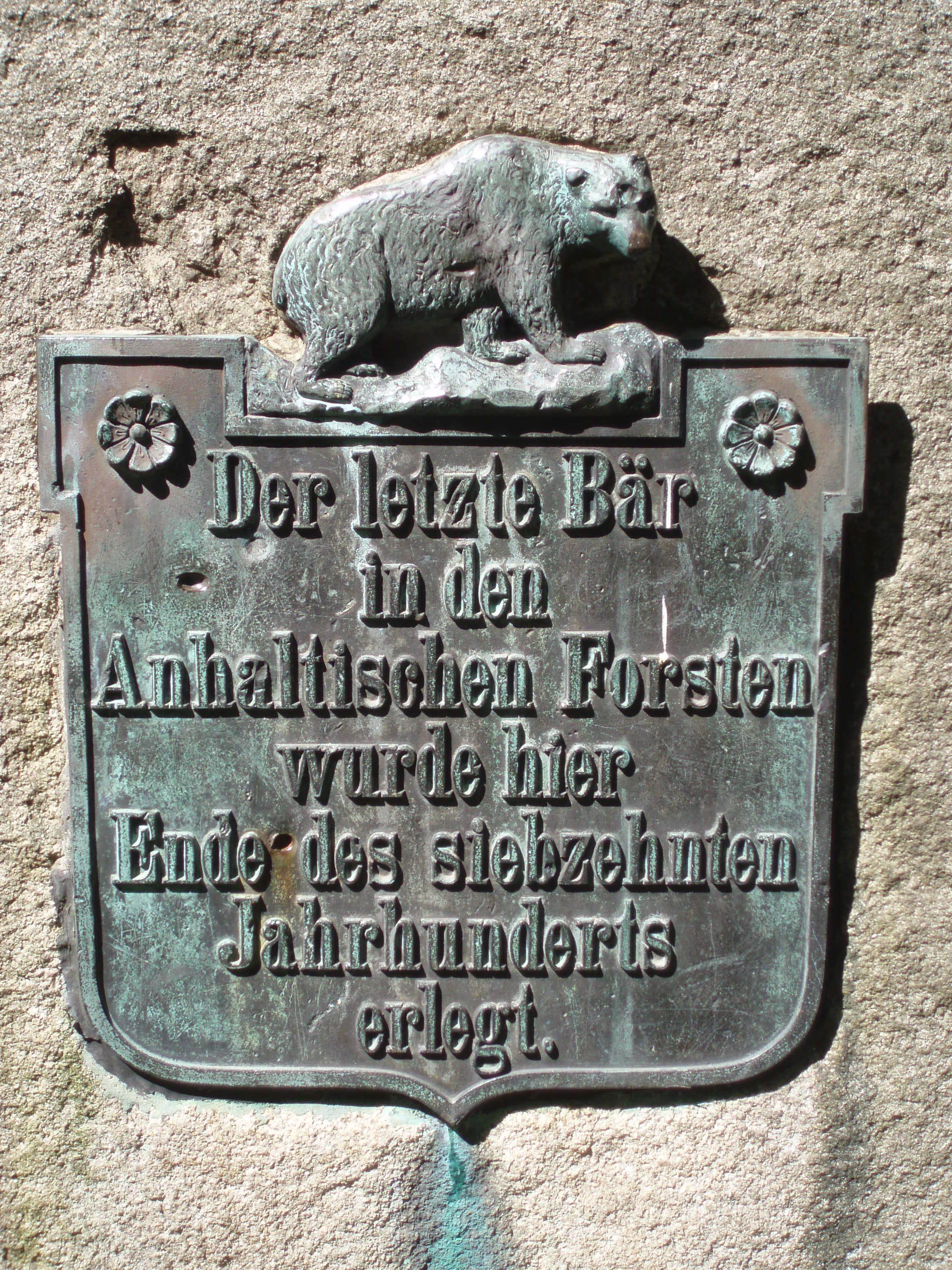
The Bear Monument
