= Ölbergshöhe =

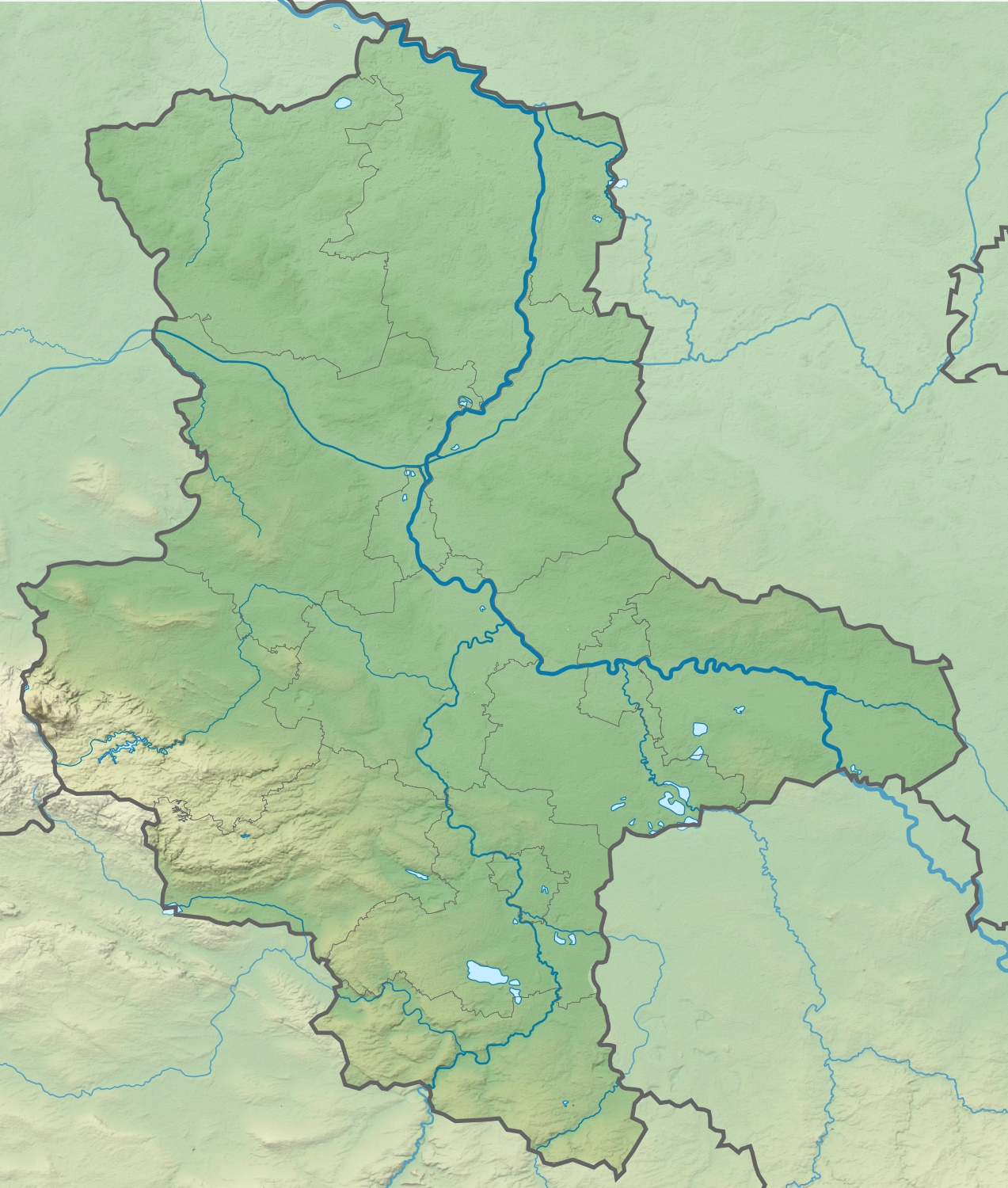
- Location within Saxony-Anhalt

Highest point
- Elevation: 320.6 m above sea level (NN) (1,052 ft)
- Coordinates: 51°43′20″N 11°07′12″E

Geography
- Location: Harz county, Saxony-Anhalt, Germany
- Parent range: Harz (Ramberg, East Harz)

The Ölbergshöhe in the Harz Mountains of central Germany is a mountain spur, 320.6 metres (1,052 ft) above sea level, of the Ramberg ridge near Bad Suderode in the Saxony-Anhalt county of Harz.

== Location ==
The Ölbergshöhe is located within the Harz/Saxony-Anhalt Nature Park and is a northern spur of the granite massif of the Ramberg. It rises immediately to the south of Bad Suderode and a little to the southwest of Gernrode (both part of the borough of Quedlinburg) between the streams of the Kältetalbach to the west and the Hagentalbach to the east. Its northern spur is the rather lower Schwedderberg.

== Prussia Tower ==
On the Schwedderberg spur, an observation tower was first erected in 1845, called the Prussia Tower (Preußenturm, 51°43′25.8″N 11°7′8.55″E). A second tower, which was 12 metres (39 ft) high, stood there from 1885 to the 1940s and was used for firewood after the Second World War because it had fallen into disrepair.

In 1953, a new tower, the Thomas Müntzer Tower, was erected, made of timber-framing. It was renamed the Prussia Tower in 1991 and was renovated in 2007. From its observation platform at treetop level there are views of Bad Suderode, Gernrode and Ballenstedt, the Harz Foreland and Quedlinburg and Halberstadt behind it and of the Brocken, 36 kilometres (22 mi) away. A toposcope on the platform acts as an aid to orientation.

== Hiking ==
A section of the E11 European long distance path from Bad Suderode to Gernrode runs over the north flanks of the Ölbergshöhe and Schwedderberg. Crossing this path, hikers from the Kurpark in Bad Suderode reach a very steep path up both hills before gaining the Prussia Tower. The tower is no. 185 in the system of checkpoints of the Harzer Wandernadel hiking network.
