= Gernrode/Harz =

Coordinates: 51°43′N 11°08′E

Gernrode/Harz was a Verwaltungsgemeinschaft ("collective municipality") in the district of Harz, in Saxony-Anhalt, Germany. The seat of the Verwaltungsgemeinschaft was Gernrode. Between 1 January 2011 and 19 February 2013 it was disbanded as its members temporarily became part of the town Quedlinburg. It was finally disbanded in January 2014.

The Verwaltungsgemeinschaft Gernrode/Harz consisted of the following municipalities:

1. Bad Suderode
2. Gernrode
3. Rieder
