= Wolfsberg Castle =

Wolfsberg Castle may refer to the following castles:

- Wolfsberg Castle (Carinthia), in Wolfsberg, Carinthia, Austria
- Wolfsberg Castle (Harz), a ruined castle in the Harz mountains, Saxony-Anhalt, Germany
- Wolfsberg Castle (Obertrubach), a ruined castle in Obertrubach, in Franconian Switzerland, Bavaria, Germany

== See also ==
- Wolfsburg Castle, Neustadt
- Wolfsburg Castle, Wolfsburg
