= Erichsberg Castle =

- Erichsburg
- Friedrichsbrunn
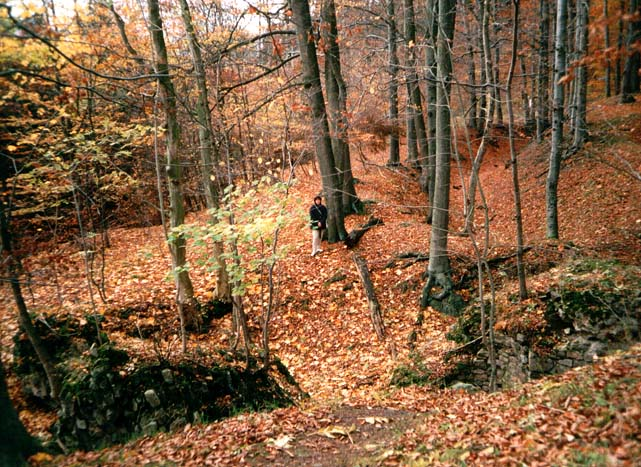
- Ruins of Erichsberg Castle

Site information
- Code: DE-ST
- Condition: burgstall (no above-ground ruins)

Location
- Location within Saxony-Anhalt Location within Germany
- Coordinates: 51°41′20″N 11°03′35″E

Site history
- Built: 1100 to 1200

Garrison information
- Occupants: nobility, counts

The Erichsburg, formerly Erichsberg, (German: Burg Erichsberg) is a ruined medieval castle near the village of Friedrichsbrunn (borough of Thale) in the Harz Mountains in central Germany. It is located within the boundaries of Gernrode, a part of Quedlinburg.

== History ==
In 1320 Count Henry of Stolberg bought the fortified manor house of Erichsberg, together with other goods and chattels, from Heineke of Hoym and Bertholdus II of Arnswald, known as Geylvus (today Geilfuss/ Geilfuß). The castle had first been mentioned in the 12th century and was probably built to protect a trading route. In order to protect his new possessions, he enfeoffed it, along with Wolfsberg Castle which he had purchased at the same time, in 1325 to the Bishop of Halberstadt.

Count Henry of Stolberg left Erichsberg to his cousin, Hermann, who based mercenaries in the houses at Erichsberg that had ravaged Thuringian Land, especially the Counts of Hohnstein from Sondershausen. Whereupon in 1346 Margrave Frederick together with the citizens of Erfurt, Mühlhausen and Nordhausen marched on the castle, took the Count of Stolberg prisoner and destroyed the site. The Erichsberg could not be rebuilt and its ruins were transferred to the Stolberg Amt of Bärenrode.

Of the former castle, a few small remnants of the walls and short sections of the old ramparts and moat are still visible.
