= Große Teufelsmühle =

Mountain in Germany

Coordinates: 51°41′05.4″N 11°04′46.3″E

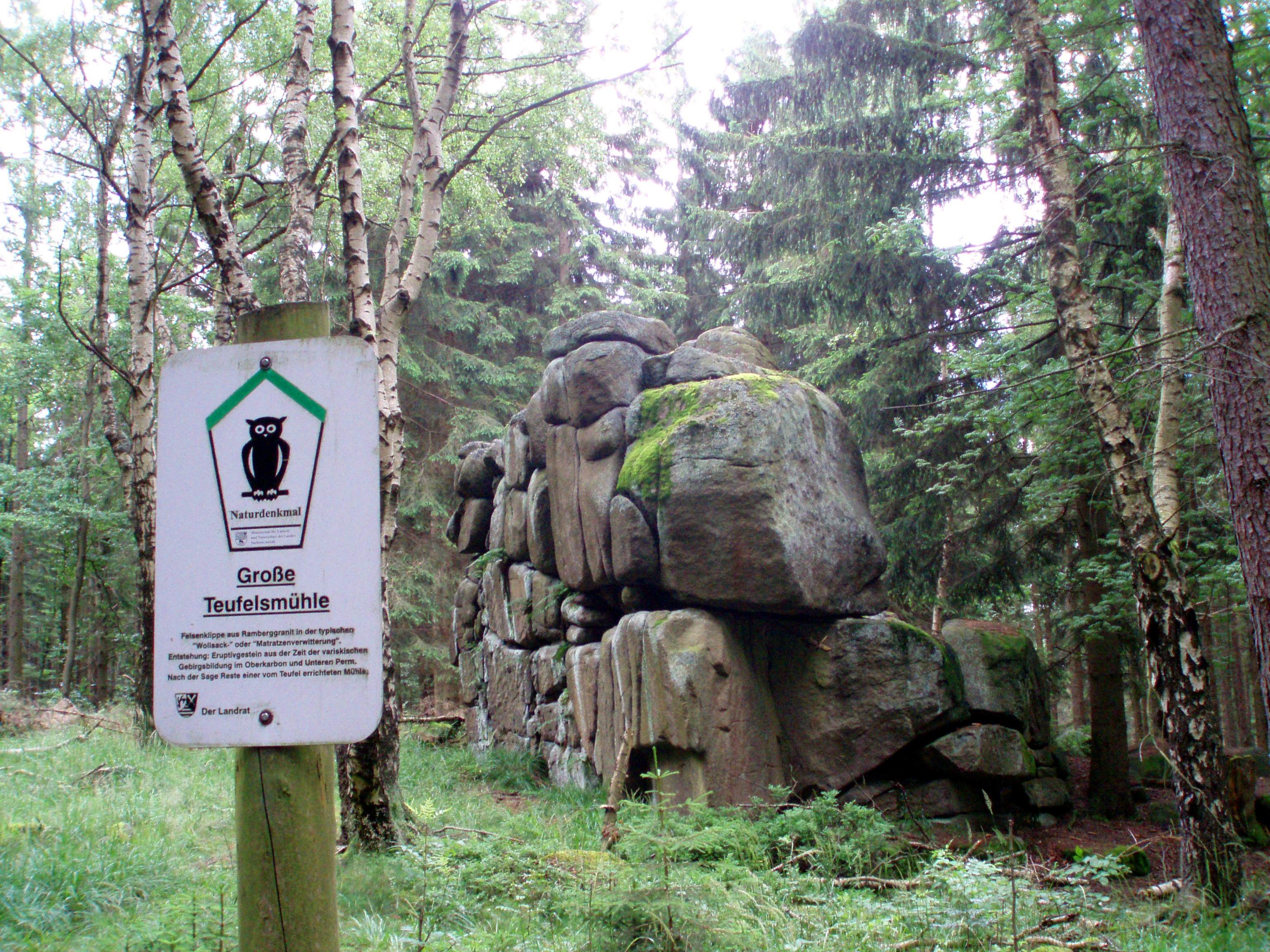
Große Teufelsmühle

The Große Teufelsmühle is a natural monument on the Viktorshöhe near Friedrichsbrunn in the Harz Mountains of central Germany. The name means "Great Devil's Mill". It is a tor, a granite rock formation that displays typical spheroidal or "mattress" weathering. The Große Teufelsmühle is a protected monument. Next to it is a checkpoint (no. 189) in the Harzer Wandernadel hiking system. In the vicinity is another rock formation, the Kleine Teufelsmühle.

The shape of the rocks has led to a legend that links it with the ruins of a mill occupied by the devil.
