= Bremer Teich =

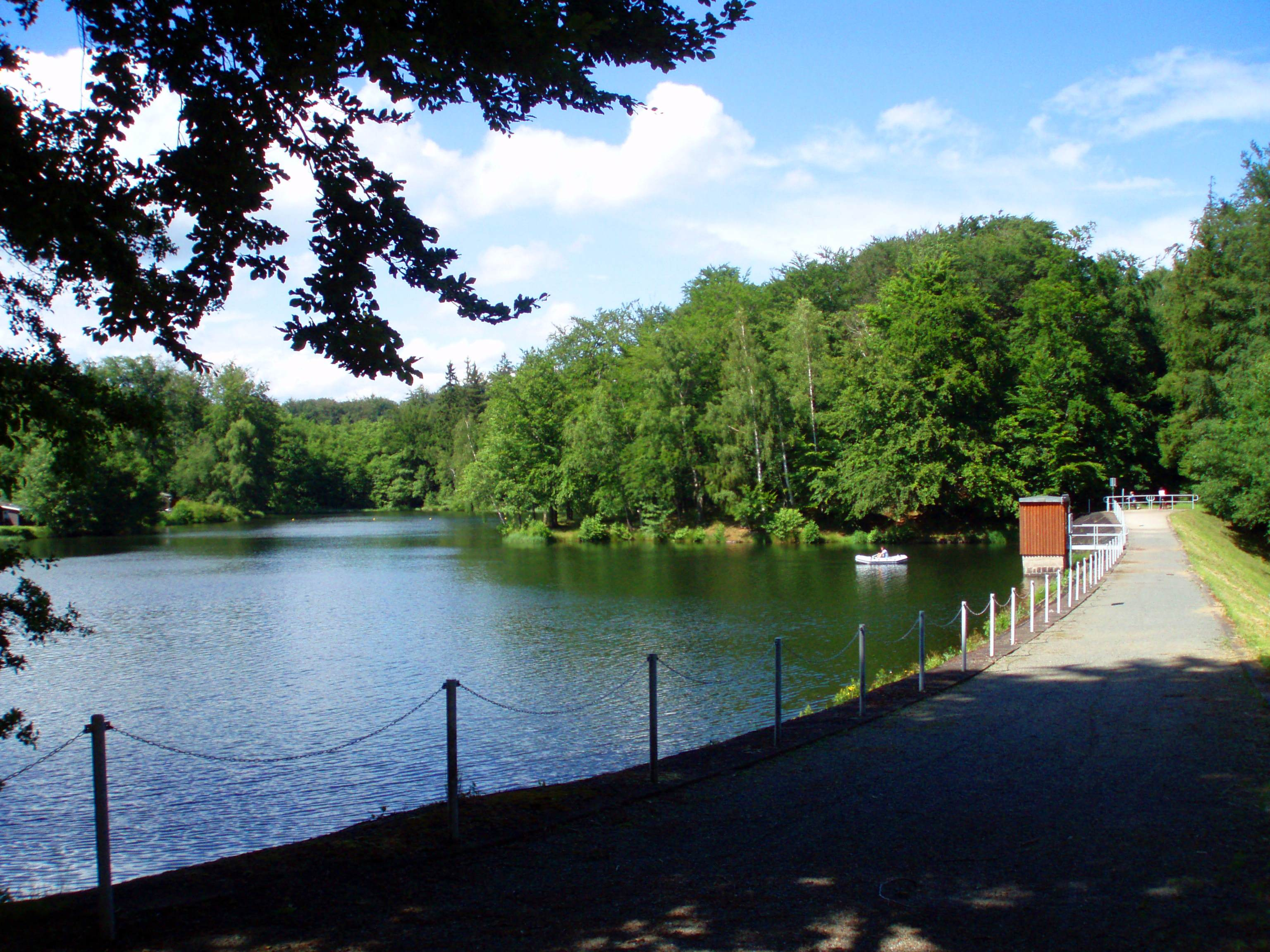
- Dam of the Bremer Teich
- Interactive map of Bremer Teich
- Location: Landkreis Harz
- Coordinates: 51.68611°N 11.11139°E
- Construction began: 1796. rebuilt 1968

Dam and spillways
- Impounds: Bremer Graben
- Length: 80 m (260 ft)
- Elevation at crest: 12 m (39 ft)

Reservoir
- Total capacity: 0.1×10^{6} m^{3} (3.5×10^{6} cu ft)
- Catchment area: 1.3 km^{2} (0.50 sq mi)
- Surface area: 4.0 ha (9.9 acres)

The Bremer Teich ("Bremer Pond") is an historic reservoir that lies south of the two villages of Bad Suderode and Gernrode in the Harz Mountains of Germany, and is used as a recreation area (natural swimming pool and camp site). It impounds the Bremer Graben, an artificial channel fed by water from the Bode and the Saale. The water reservoir was built in the 18th century in the Lower Harz (Saxony-Anhalt). It has an area of ca. 4 ha. The pond is located on the Romanesque Road and the North Harz Cycleway.

The pond was originally called the Hirschteich ("Stag Pond"). It was laid out in 1796 and was actually intended to trap deer.

In 1696, in the area around the pond, the last bear was killed by the Anhalt prince, Victo Amadeus, whilst he was par force hunting. To commemorate this event the Bear Monument (Bärendenkmal) was erected in 1900.

The Bremer Teich owes its name to the engineer, Bremer, who built the dam. The dam is an earth barrage with internal compaction (Innenverdichtung) In 1968 this was further reinforced by and the pond became the Bremer Dammteich. A youth hostel, camp site and restaurant have been built by the pond.

The Bremer Teich is no. 196 in the system of hiking checkpoints in the Harzer Wandernadel.
