= Bear Monument =

Monument in Germany

Coordinates: 51.6822°N 11.1008°E

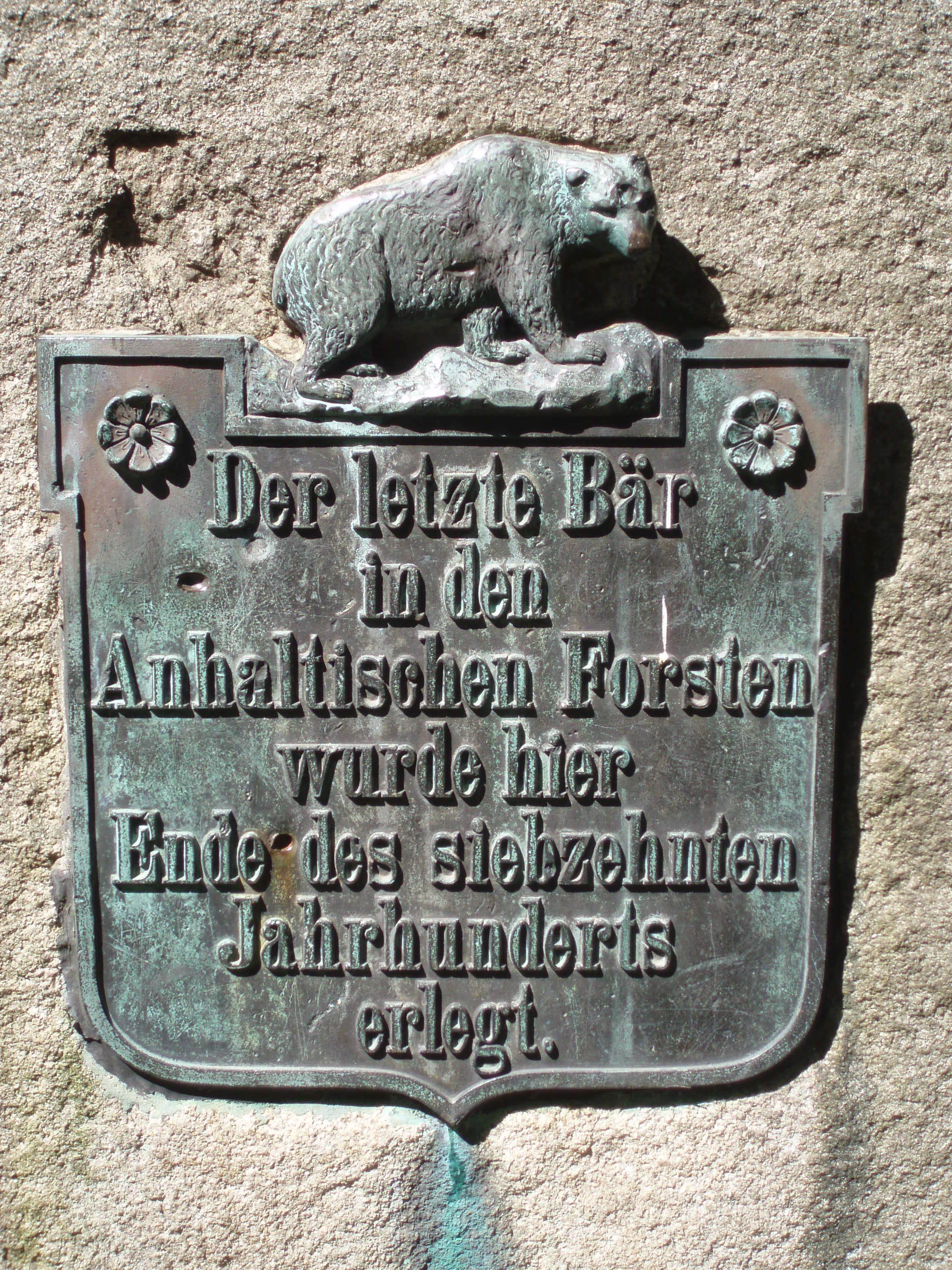
Bear monument

The Bear Monument (German: Bärendenkmal) is a monument to bears in the Harz mountains of central Germany. It stands by a forest track and walking trail in woods not far from the Bremer Teich and the Viktorshöhe hill and marks the spot where the last bear was killed in 1696 in the Anhalt Forest. The monument was erected around 1900. It is a glacial erratic boulder on which a cast-iron memorial plate with an inscription has been affixed. Next to the bear monument is a checkpoint (no. 184) which is part of the Harzer Wandernadel network of hiking trails.

The last bear in the Upper Harz was killed about 90 years later near Wernigerode. A coachman or carter named Buchtekirch shot it between 1786 and 1788 and received a reward form of two Reichstaler from the Count of Stolberg.

A similar monument is the Luchsstein ("Lynx Stone") near Lautenthal, which commemorates the killing of the last wild lynx in the Harz in 1818.
