= Wolfsberg Castle (Harz) =

Medieval castle in Saxony-Anhalt, Germany

Coordinates: 51°33′05″N 11°05′58.5″E

The ruins of Wolfsberg Castle (German: Burgruine Wolfsberg) lie on an eminence in the municipality of Wolfsberg in the German state of Saxony-Anhalt. Of the once extensive mediaeval castle only a few foundation remnants survive.

== History ==
It is believed that Wolfsberg Castle, like its southeastern neighbour, Questenberg Castle, was built by the counts of Beichlingen-Rothenburg around the year 1300. Around 1309, it entered into the possession of the counts of Anhalt-Bernburg, who enfeoffed the castle. The new lords of the castle (Burgherren) were hostile towards their neighbours, the counts of Stolberg, and raided their estates. In 1320, after a legal decision in his favour, Count Henry of Stolberg took the law into his own hands and captured Wolfsberg Castle. In order to protect the estate from the claims of the House of Anhalt, he transferred it as a fief to Bishop Albert of Halberstadt and was officially enfeoffed with it on 18 December 1325 along with Erichsberg Castle.

At the end of 1326, Wolfsberg Castle was used as an expiatory object in the conflict over the castles of Ebersberg and Erichsberg. In later years, it was enfeoffed several times by the counts of Stolberg, but always with the option of being redeemed. Wolfsberg and Erichsberg remained fiefs of the Bishopric of Halberstadt.

The castle was damaged during the Peasants' War of 1525, but even prior to that it had become run down, because in 1511 repairs to its roof and walls were carried out at the behest of the comital Vogt of Stolberg, Volkmar of Morungen. From a report by the Wolfsberg Amtmann, Michel Sultzpach, to Count Wolfgang of Stolberg in 1549, it is understood that Haus Wolfsberg, together with its barns and livestock sheds, was rebuilt for 2,000 guilders. This leaves open the question as to whether it was referring to the castle or the manor of the estate of Wolfsberg which was built in 1524.

Wolfsberg was enfeoffed several times even in the early modern period, but finally fell into ruins in the 18th century for lack of maintenance.
