= Bad Suderode =

- Stadtteil of Quedlinburg
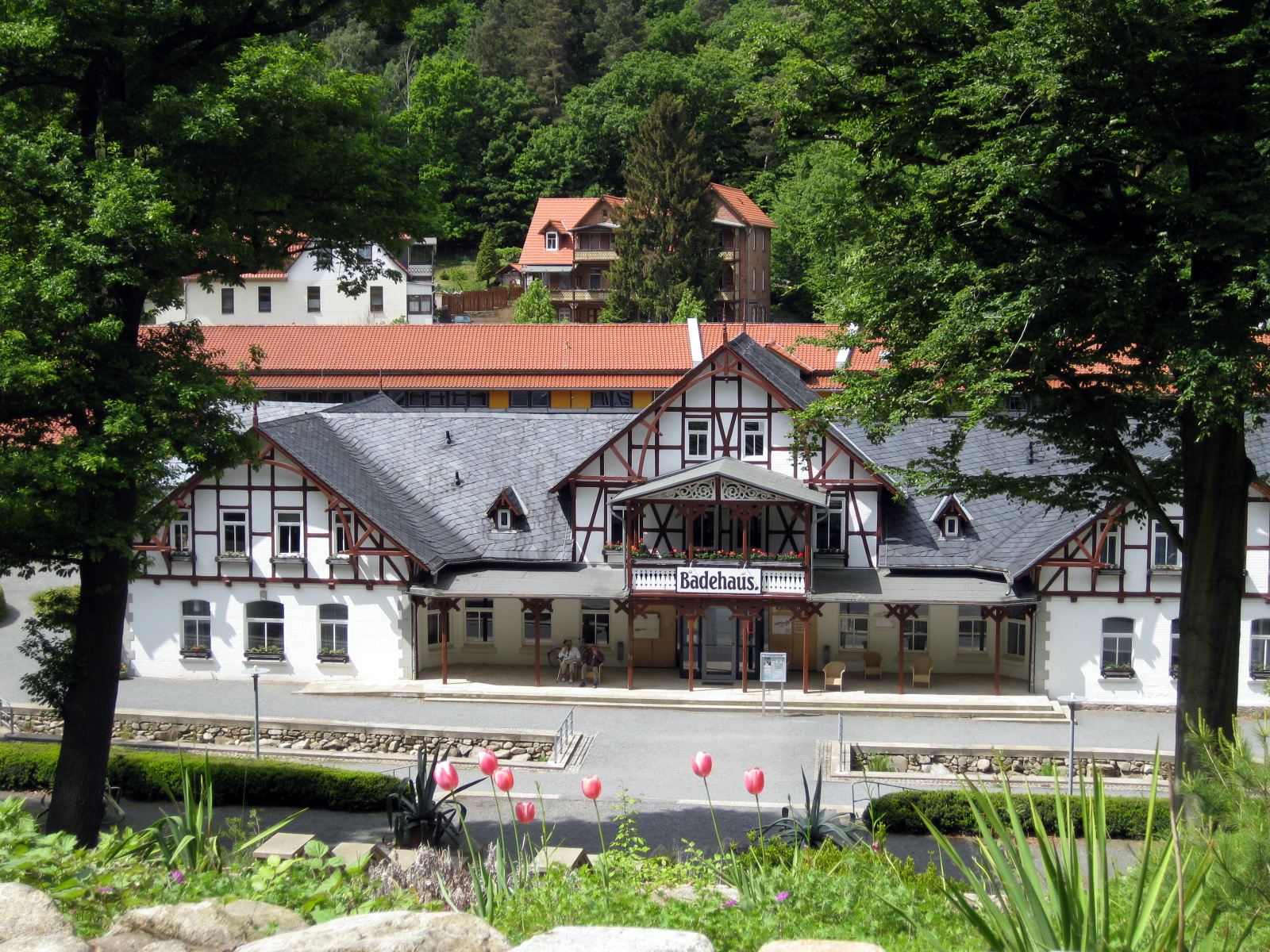
- Spa building

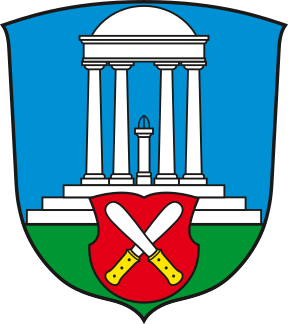
- Coat of arms
- Interactive map of Bad Suderode
- Location within Germany Location within Saxony-Anhalt
- Coordinates: 51°44′N 11°7′E
- Country: Germany
- State: Saxony-Anhalt
- District: Harz
- Town: Quedlinburg

Area
  - Total: 8.21 km^{2} (3.17 sq mi)
- Elevation: 199 m (653 ft)

Population (2012-12-31)
  - Total: 1,735
  - Density: 211/km^{2} (547/sq mi)
- Time zone: UTC+01:00 (CET)
  - Summer (DST): UTC+02:00 (CEST)
- Postal codes: 06507
- Dialling codes: 039485
- Vehicle registration: HZ
- Website: www.bad-suderode.de

Bad Suderode (German pronunciation: [baːt zuːdəˈʁoːdə]) is a village and a former municipality in the district of Harz, Saxony-Anhalt, Germany. Since 1 January 2014, it has for administrative purposes been included as part of the municipality of Quedlinburg. It is situated in a valley in the northern part of the Harz mountains, on the road from Quedlinburg to Friedrichsbrunn.

The place is one of several spa resorts in the area. The local spring water is noted for its exceptionally high concentrations of calcium.

== History ==
It was only in 1914 that Suderode was renamed Bad Suderode.

Between 1 January 2011 and 19 February 2013, Bad Suderode was also part of the municipality of Quedlinburg. However, the 2011 municipal merger was, in 2013, declared invalid by the judicial decision of a constitutional court. The leading judge explained the court decision which was based on the over-riding importance of legal clarity. The 2011 merger lacked legal clarity because of the failure of the responsible council leaders to comply with time-lines regarding a two-month notification period, which they had themselves included as a requirement for the process.
