= Gernrode =

- Stadtteil of Quedlinburg
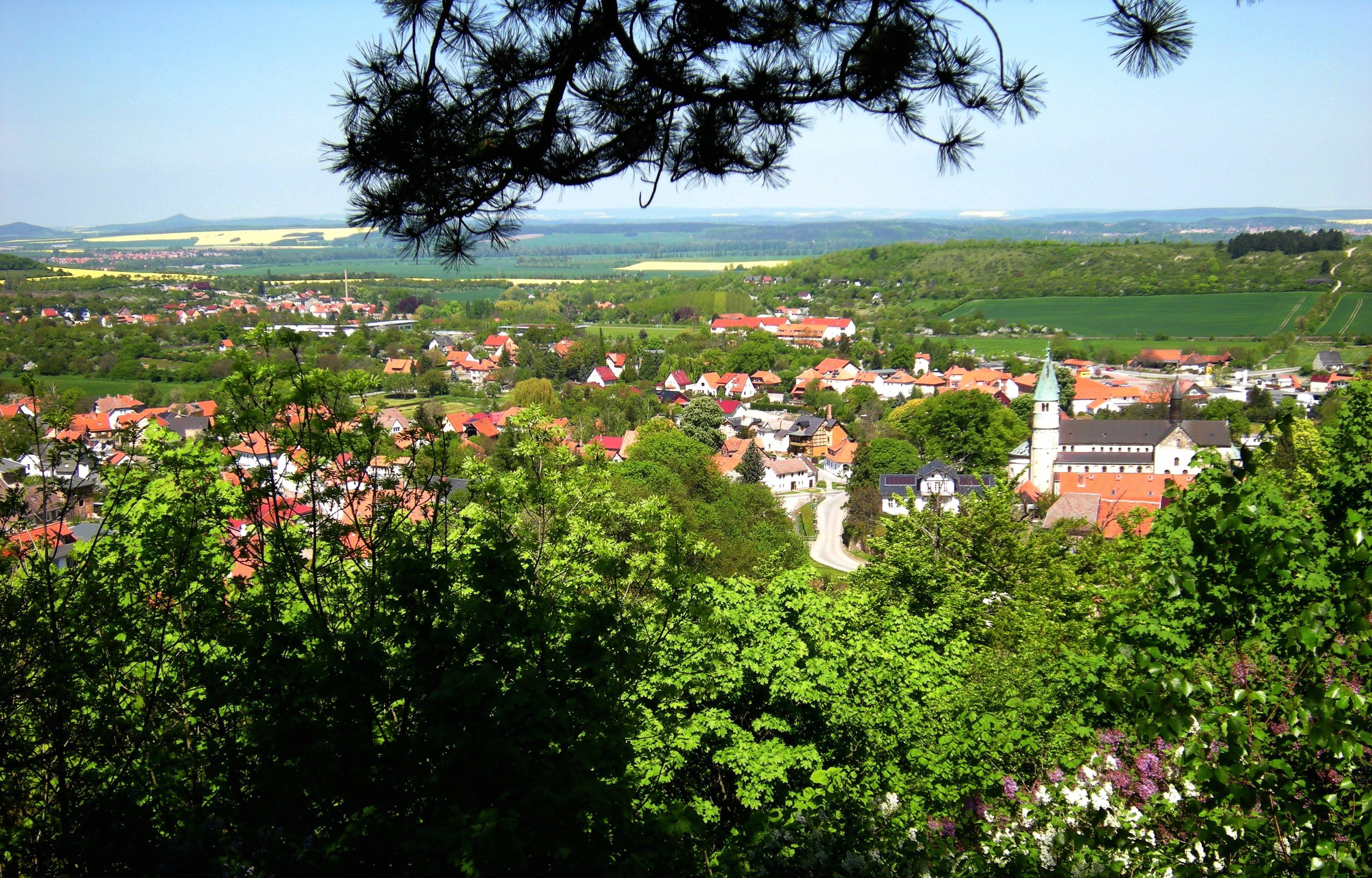
- View from the Harz mountains

- Coat of arms
- Interactive map of Gernrode
- Location within Germany Location within Saxony-Anhalt
- Coordinates: 51°43′28″N 11°8′21″E
- Country: Germany
- State: Saxony-Anhalt
- District: Harz
- Town: Quedlinburg

Area
  - Total: 34.06 km^{2} (13.15 sq mi)
- Elevation: 217 m (712 ft)

Population (2012-12-31)
  - Total: 3,533
  - Density: 103.7/km^{2} (268.7/sq mi)
- Time zone: UTC+01:00 (CET)
  - Summer (DST): UTC+02:00 (CEST)
- Postal codes: 06507
- Dialling codes: 039485
- Vehicle registration: HZ
- Website: www.stadt-gernrode.de

Gernrode (German pronunciation: [ɡɛʁnˈʁoːdə]) is a historic town and former municipality in the Harz District, in Saxony-Anhalt, Germany. Since 1 January 2014, it has been part of Quedlinburg. It was the seat of the former Verwaltungsgemeinschaft ("municipal association") of Gernrode/Harz.

First mentioned in 961, Gernrode received the privilege to bear its own coat of arms and seal, commonly regarded as town privileges. The town is best known for the Ottonian church of Saint Cyriakus, the collegiate church of a former Imperial chapter of nuns, and as the start of the narrow gauge Selke Valley Railway.

== Geography ==
Gernrode is situated at the northeastern rim of the Harz mountain range and the Harz/Saxony-Anhalt Nature Park, about 6.5 km (4.0 mi) south of Quedlinburg. It lies at 215 m (705 ft) above sea level, at the foot of the Ramberg massif. It is nationally recognized for its health facilities and has state recognition as a spa town, where one may take the cure and recuperate in general (staatlich anerkannter Kur- und Erholungsort).

The town is also known as 'Gernrode/Harz', because of its location in the Harz mountains, and to distinguish it from Gernrode in the district of Eichsfeld in Thuringia, also called 'Gernrode (Eichsfeld)'.

== History ==
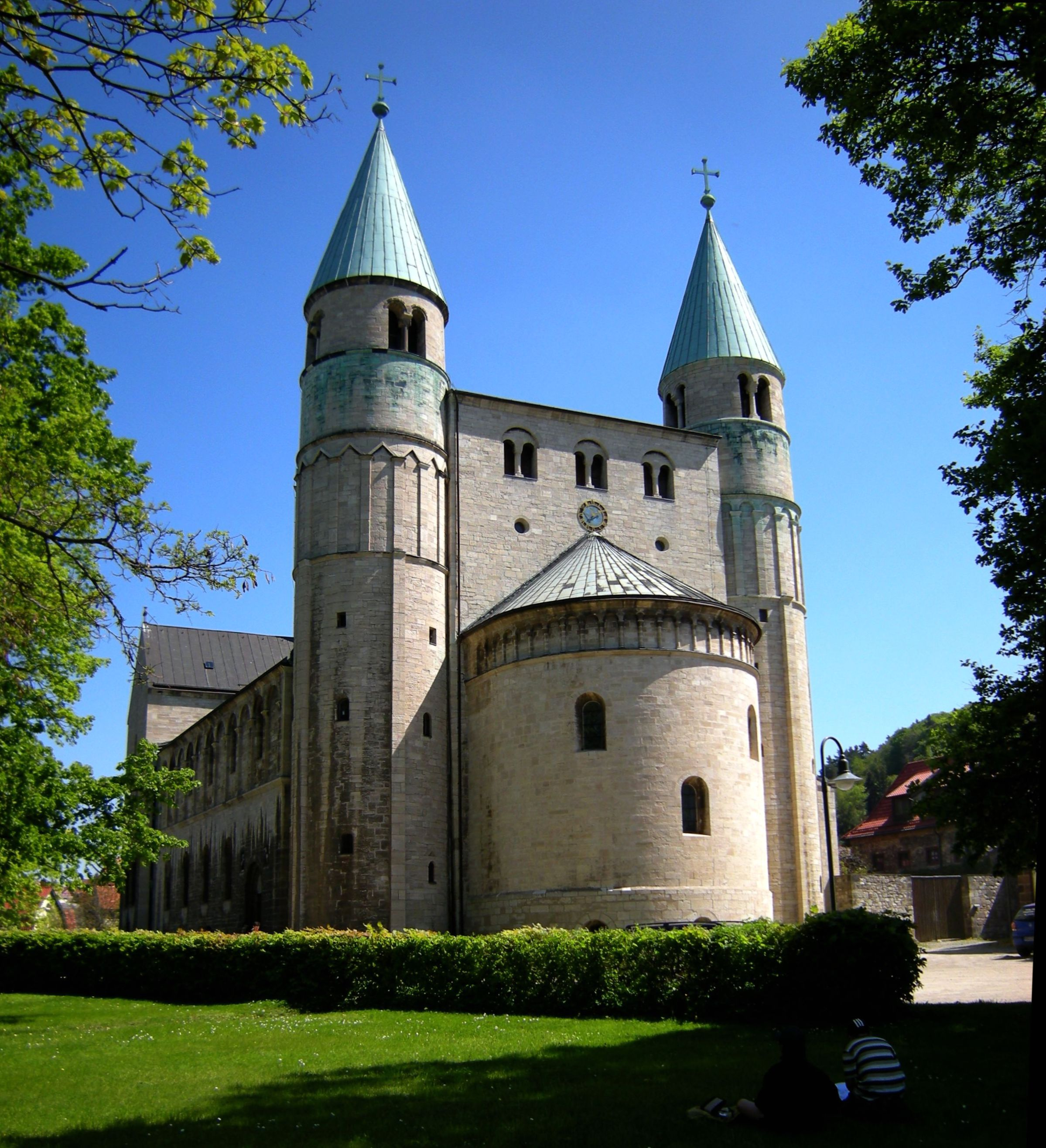
St Cyriacus Church

In 959 the Saxon margrave Gero founded a convent of canonesses in the Schwabengau territory, within the grounds of the Geronisroth fortification he built about the same time. He also founded the collegiate church for the convent, which King Otto I took under his special protection by a 961 deed. It was dedicated to Saint Cyriacus, whose relics Gero brought back for the church from his second journey to Rome in 963. Without male heirs, he bequested his vast properties to the convent and made his daughter-in-law Hathui (d. 1014), widow of his son Siegfried, first abbess (r.959-1014). She was succeeded by Adelaide I (r.1014-1045), a sister of Emperor Otto III, who was also Princess-abbess of Quedlinburg (r.999-1045).

Initially the Gernrode convent was on a par with the Imperial abbeys of Quedlinburg and Gandersheim. However, its secular Vogt protectors from the Ascanian princes of Anhalt, descendants of Albert the Bear, became increasingly powerful. Yet in 1188, Emperor Frederick Barbarossa held a Hoftag in Gernrode and donated a bell to the St. Stephan church (Stephanikirche, also known as the Market church or Marktkirche), the second historical church in Gernrode built in 1046. In the thirteenth century, Adelaide II was abbess of Gernrode (r.1207-1220).

The Protestant Reformation came to Anhalt and Gernrode in 1521. A Protestant elementary school was founded in 1533 according to the ideas of Martin Luther. Closely linked to the University of Wittenberg, the premises were used as a school until 1847, when it moved into St Stephen's Church, and may be the oldest such school in Germany. In 1565 Elisabeth of Anhalt-Zerbst (1545–1574) became abbess of Gernrode and the convent was led by Ascanian princesses ever since. It was finally disbanded in 1614, when the last abbess Sophia Elizabeth (1589–1622), daughter of the Ascanian prince John George I of Anhalt-Dessau, married Duke George Rudolf of Liegnitz.

Gernrode received brewing rights in 1545. Beer brewing has since stopped, but a distillery is still present in the city. The city was traditionally part of the Duchy of Anhalt and a district of Ballenstedt. From 1037 to 1740 lead and silver were mined here. Matches and guns were also made in Gernrode. Parts of Gernrode were burnt in the Thirty Years' War (twice, in 1631 and 1635). In 1728 Emperor Charles VI formally enfeoffed the Anhalt princes with Gernode which was incorporated into Anhalt-Bernburg, raised to a duchy in 1806.

Due to its picturesque setting, Gernrode became a popular destination for recreational visitors from the early 19th century onwards. Goethe, Heinrich von Kleist and Wilhelm von Kügelgen stayed here, followed by numerous vacationers, and tourism became a significant economic factor. The town had 2,533 (Protestant) inhabitants in 1885.

On 19 April 1945, at the end of World War II, Gernrode was taken by the US Army without a battle, followed by occupation by Soviet troops in June. As part of the Soviet occupation zone, Gernrode belonged to East Germany from 1949 until German reunification in 1990. It celebrated its 1,000th year in 1961 and 450th year as a town in 1989. In 2001, celebrations to honour Emperor Otto I were held. Between 1 January 2011 and 19 February 2013, Gernrode was part of the town Quedlinburg, and again after 1 January 2014.

== Infrastructure ==
=== Transport ===
==== Selke Valley Railway ====
Gernrode is the starting point of the Selke Valley Railway (Selketalbahn), a narrow-gauge railway. The line was built in 1887 and after initially climbing through the mountains, follows the Selke river valley to Stiege. The total length from Gernrode to Stiege is 35 km.

== Attractions ==
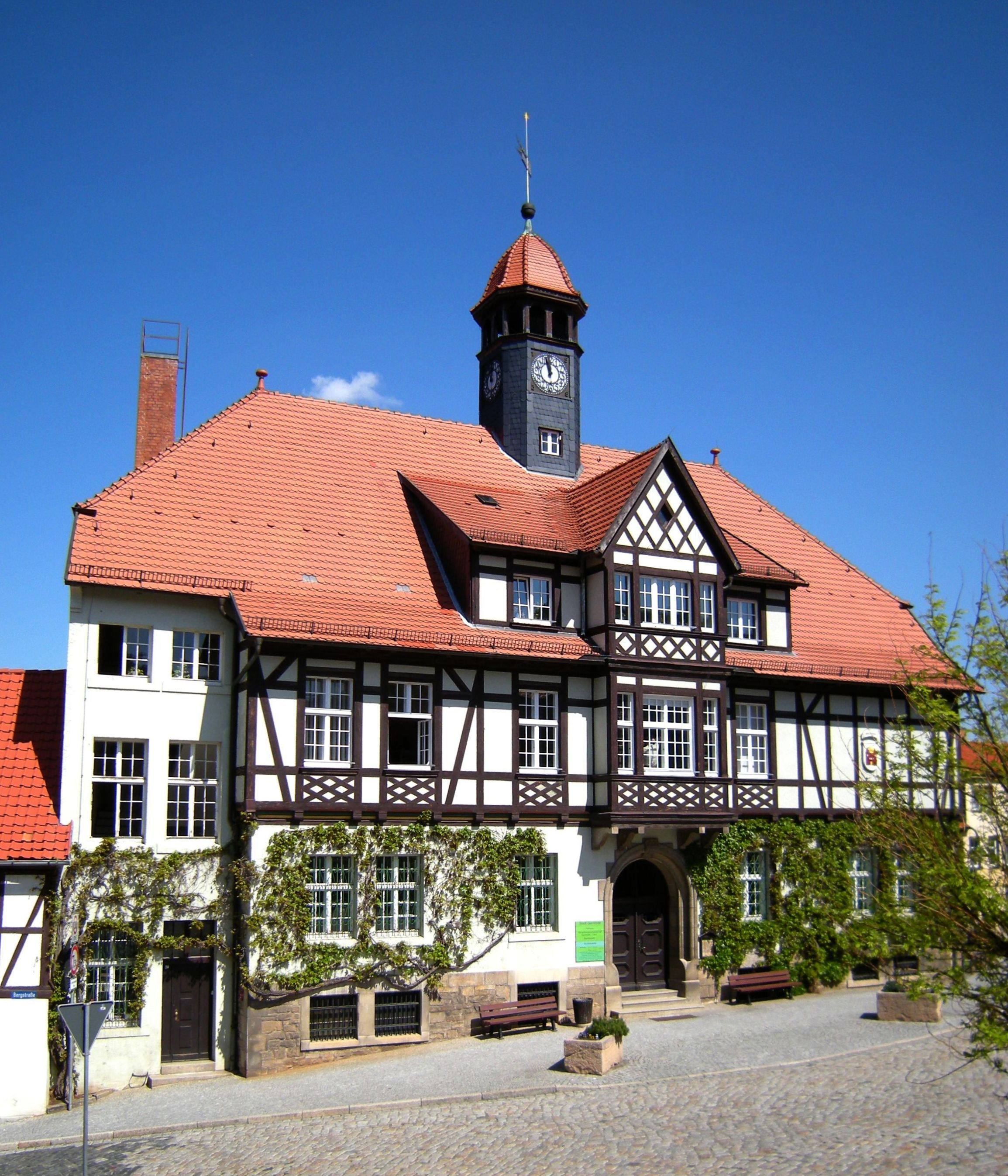
Town hall

Attractions include the giant cuckoo clock (whose cuckoo appears every fifteen minutes), which was listed in the Guinness Book of Records in 1998. This is part of a clock factory, which also incorporates a giant weather house indicating current weather conditions. Other local attractions include a 7.45 m giant wood thermometer, the largest Skat table in the world, and the Prussia Tower on the Ölbergshöhe.

== Governance ==
=== Town twinning ===
Gernrode is twinned with:

- Bachant, France, since 1969
- Walsrode, Germany, since 1990
