= Friedrichsbrunn =

- Stadtteil of Thale
- Coat of arms
- Interactive map of Friedrichsbrunn
- Location within Germany Location within Saxony-Anhalt
- Coordinates: 51°41′23″N 11°2′18″E
- Country: Germany
- State: Saxony-Anhalt
- District: Harz
- Town: Thale

Area
  - Total: 18.34 km^{2} (7.08 sq mi)
- Elevation: 533 m (1,749 ft)

Population (2006-12-31)
  - Total: 1,038
  - Density: 56.60/km^{2} (146.6/sq mi)
- Time zone: UTC+01:00 (CET)
  - Summer (DST): UTC+02:00 (CEST)
- Postal codes: 06507
- Dialling codes: 039487
- Vehicle registration: HZ
- Website: www.friedrichsbrunn.de

Friedrichsbrunn (German pronunciation: [fʁiːdʁɪçsˈbʁʊn]) is a village and a former municipality in the district of Harz, in Saxony-Anhalt, Germany. Since 23 November 2009, it is part of the town Thale.

== History ==
At the location of Friedrichsbrunn there has been a well and a resting place along the road between Quedlinburg and Nordhausen since the 11th century. In 1680, a Prussian border watch station was built at the well, which was known as the Ungetreuer Brunnen (Unfaithful Well). Between 1773 and 1775, King Friedrich the Great settled the area with 50 families and the place took the name Friedrichsbrunn.

The first tourists spent their summer here in 1884. Before World War I, two sanitoriums, three larger hotels, and numerous bed and breakfasts were built in Friedrichsbrunn and it became known as a health resort. During the world wars, these facilities were used as military hospitals.

In 1949, Friedrichsbrunn was recognized as a health and winter sports resort. Up to 1990, as many as 20,000 vacationers and patients came here each year. After the fall of the Berlin Wall, mass tourism declined.
